= List of FIPS region codes (A–C) =

This is a list of FIPS 10-4 region codes from A-C, using a standardized name format, and cross-linking to articles.

On September 2, 2008, FIPS 10-4 was one of ten standards withdrawn by NIST as a Federal Information Processing Standard. The list here is the last version of codes. For earlier versions, see link below.

== AC: Antigua and Barbuda ==
FIPS Code	Region
AC01	Barbuda Dependency, Antigua and Barbuda
AC03	Saint George Parish, Antigua and Barbuda
AC04	Saint John Parish, Antigua and Barbuda
AC05	Saint Mary Parish, Antigua and Barbuda
AC06	Saint Paul Parish, Antigua and Barbuda
AC07	Saint Peter Parish, Antigua and Barbuda
AC08	Saint Philip Parish, Antigua and Barbuda
AC09	Redonda Dependency, Antigua and Barbuda

== AE: United Arab Emirates ==
FIPS Code	Region
AE01	Abū Z̧aby Emirate, United Arab Emirates
AE02	`Ajmān Emirate, United Arab Emirates
AE03	Dubayy Emirate, United Arab Emirates
AE04	Al Fujayrah Emirate, United Arab Emirates
AE05	Ra's al Khaymah Emirate, United Arab Emirates
AE06	Ash Shāriqah Emirate, United Arab Emirates
AE07	Umm al Qaywayn Emirate, United Arab Emirates

== AF: Afghanistan ==
FIPS Code	Region
AF01	Badakhshan Province, Afghanistan
AF02	Badghis Province, Afghanistan
AF03	Baghlan Province, Afghanistan
AF05	Bamyan Province, Afghanistan
AF06	Farah Province, Afghanistan
AF07	Faryab Province, Afghanistan
AF08	Ghazni Province, Afghanistan
AF09	Ghor Province, Afghanistan
AF10	Helmand Province, Afghanistan
AF11	Herat Province, Afghanistan
AF13	Kabul Province, Afghanistan
AF14	Kapisa Province, Afghanistan
AF17	Lowgar Province, Afghanistan
AF18	Nangarhar Province, Afghanistan
AF19	Nimruz Province, Afghanistan
AF23	Kandahar Province, Afghanistan
AF24	Kondoz Province, Afghanistan
AF26	Takhar Province, Afghanistan
AF27	Vardak Province, Afghanistan
AF28	Zabol Province, Afghanistan
AF29	Paktika Province, Afghanistan
AF30	Balkh Province, Afghanistan
AF31	Jowzjan Province, Afghanistan
AF32	Samangan Province, Afghanistan
AF33	Sar-e Pol Province, Afghanistan
AF34	Konar Province, Afghanistan
AF35	Laghman Province, Afghanistan
AF36	Paktia Province, Afghanistan
AF37	Khost Province, Afghanistan
AF38	Nurestan Province, Afghanistan
AF39	Orūzgān Province, Afghanistan
AF40	Parvān Province, Afghanistan
AF41	Daykundi Province, Afghanistan
AF42	Panjshīr Province, Afghanistan

== AG: Algeria ==
FIPS Code	Region
AG01	Algiers Province
AG03	Batna Province
AG04	Constantine Province
AG06	Médéa Province
AG07	Mostaganem Province
AG09	Oran Province
AG10	Saïda Province
AG12	Sétif Province
AG13	Tiaret Province
AG14	Tizi Ouzou Province
AG15	Tlemcen Province
AG18	Béjaïa Province
AG19	Biskra Province
AG20	Blida Province
AG21	Bouïra Province
AG22	Djelfa Province
AG23	Guelma Province
AG24	Jijel Province
AG25	Laghouat Province
AG26	Mascara Province
AG27	M'Sila Province
AG29	Oum El Bouaghi Province
AG30	Sidi Bel Abbès Province
AG31	Skikda Province
AG33	Tébessa Province
AG34	Adrar Province
AG35	Aïn Defla Province
AG36	Aïn Témouchent Province
AG37	Annaba Province
AG38	Béchar Province
AG39	Bordj Bou Arréridj Province
AG40	Boumerdès Province
AG41	Chlef Province
AG42	El Bayadh Province
AG43	El Oued Province
AG44	El Taref Province
AG45	Ghardaïa Province
AG46	Illizi Province
AG47	Khenchela Province
AG48	Mila Province
AG49	Naâma Province
AG50	Ouargla Province
AG51	Relizane Province
AG52	Souk Ahras Province
AG53	Tamanrasset Province
AG54	Tindouf Province
AG55	Tipaza Province
AG56	Tissemsilt Province

== AJ: Azerbaijan ==
FIPS Code	Region
AJ01	Abşeron Rayon, Azerbaijan
AJ02	Ağcabǝdi Rayon, Azerbaijan
AJ03	Ağdam Rayon, Azerbaijan
AJ04	Ağdaş Rayon, Azerbaijan
AJ05	Ağstafa Rayon, Azerbaijan
AJ06	Ağsu Rayon, Azerbaijan
AJ07	Əli Bayramlı City, Azerbaijan
AJ08	Astara Rayon, Azerbaijan
AJ09	Bakı City, Azerbaijan
AJ10	Balakǝn Rayon, Azerbaijan
AJ11	Bǝrdǝ Rayon, Azerbaijan
AJ12	Beylǝqan Rayon, Azerbaijan
AJ13	Biläsuvar Rayon, Azerbaijan
AJ14	Cǝbrayıl Rayon, Azerbaijan
AJ15	Cǝlilabad Rayon, Azerbaijan
AJ16	Daşkǝsǝn Rayon, Azerbaijan
AJ17	Dǝvǝçi Rayon, Azerbaijan
AJ18	Füzuli Rayon, Azerbaijan
AJ19	Gǝdǝbǝy Rayon, Azerbaijan
AJ20	Gǝncǝ City, Azerbaijan
AJ21	Goranboy Rayon, Azerbaijan
AJ22	Göyçay Rayon, Azerbaijan
AJ23	Hacıqabul Rayon, Azerbaijan
AJ24	İmişli Rayon, Azerbaijan
AJ25	İsmayıllı Rayon, Azerbaijan
AJ26	Kǝlbǝcǝr Rayon, Azerbaijan
AJ27	Kürdämir Rayon, Azerbaijan
AJ28	Laçın Rayon, Azerbaijan
AJ29	Lǝnkǝran Rayon, Azerbaijan
AJ30	Lǝnkǝran City, Azerbaijan
AJ31	Lerik Rayon, Azerbaijan
AJ32	Masallı Rayon, Azerbaijan
AJ33	Mingǝcevir City, Azerbaijan
AJ34	Naftalan City, Azerbaijan
AJ35	Nakhichevan Autonomous Republic, Azerbaijan
AJ36	Neftçala Rayon, Azerbaijan
AJ37	Oğuz Rayon, Azerbaijan
AJ38	Qǝbǝlǝ Rayon, Azerbaijan
AJ39	Qax Rayon, Azerbaijan
AJ40	Qazax Rayon, Azerbaijan
AJ41	Qobustan Rayon, Azerbaijan
AJ42	Quba Rayon, Azerbaijan
AJ43	Qubadlı Rayon, Azerbaijan
AJ44	Qusar Rayon, Azerbaijan
AJ45	Saatlı Rayon, Azerbaijan
AJ46	Sabirabad Rayon, Azerbaijan
AJ47	Şǝki Rayon, Azerbaijan
AJ48	Şǝki City, Azerbaijan
AJ49	Salyan Rayon, Azerbaijan
AJ50	Şamaxı Rayon, Azerbaijan
AJ51	Şǝmkir Rayon, Azerbaijan
AJ52	Samux Rayon, Azerbaijan
AJ53	Siyǝzǝn Rayon, Azerbaijan
AJ54	Sumqayıt Rayon, Azerbaijan
AJ55	Şuşa Rayon, Azerbaijan
AJ56	Şuşa City, Azerbaijan
AJ57	Tǝrtǝr Rayon, Azerbaijan
AJ58	Tovuz Rayon, Azerbaijan
AJ59	Ucar Rayon, Azerbaijan
AJ60	Xaçmaz Rayon, Azerbaijan
AJ61	Xankǝndi City, Azerbaijan
AJ62	Goygol Rayon, Azerbaijan, formerly Xanlar Rayon
AJ63	Xızı Rayon, Azerbaijan
AJ64	Xocalı Rayon, Azerbaijan
AJ65	Xocavǝnd Rayon, Azerbaijan
AJ66	Yardımlı Rayon, Azerbaijan
AJ67	Yevlax Rayon, Azerbaijan
AJ68	Yevlax City, Azerbaijan
AJ69	Zǝngilan Rayon, Azerbaijan
AJ70	Zaqatala Rayon, Azerbaijan
AJ71	Zǝrdab Rayon, Azerbaijan

== AL: Albania ==
FIPS Code	Region
AL40	Berat County, Albania
AL41	Dibër County, Albania
AL42	Durrës County, Albania
AL43	Elbasan County, Albania
AL44	Fier County, Albania
AL45	Gjirokastër County, Albania
AL46	Korçë County, Albania
AL47	Kukës County, Albania
AL48	Lezhë County, Albania
AL49	Shkodër County, Albania
AL50	Tirana County, Albania
AL51	Vlorë County, Albania

== AM: Armenia ==
FIPS Code	Region
AM01	Aragatsotn Province, Armenia
AM02	Ararat Province, Armenia
AM03	Armavir Province, Armenia
AM04	Geghark'unik' Province, Armenia
AM05	Kotayk' Province, Armenia
AM06	Lorri Province, Armenia
AM07	Shirak Province, Armenia
AM08	Syunik' Province, Armenia
AM09	Tavush Province, Armenia
AM10	Vayots' Dzor Province, Armenia
AM11	Yerevan City, Armenia

== AN: Andorra ==
FIPS Code	Region
AN02	Canillo Parish, Andorra
AN03	Encamp Parish, Andorra
AN04	La Massana Parish, Andorra
AN05	Ordino Parish, Andorra
AN06	Sant Julià de Lòria Parish, Andorra
AN07	Andorra la Vella Parish, Andorra
AN08	Escaldes-Engordany Parish, Andorra

== AO: Angola ==
FIPS Code	Region
AO01	Benguela Province, Angola
AO02	Bié Province, Angola
AO03	Cabinda Province, Angola
AO04	Cuando Cubango Province, Angola
AO05	Cuanza Norte Province, Angola
AO06	Cuanza Sul Province, Angola
AO07	Cunene Province, Angola
AO08	Huambo Province, Angola
AO09	Huíla Province, Angola
AO12	Malanje Province, Angola
AO13	Namibe Province, Angola
AO14	Moxico Province, Angola
AO15	Uíge Province, Angola
AO16	Zaire Province, Angola
AO17	Lunda Norte Province, Angola
AO18	Lunda Sul Province, Angola
AO19	Bengo Province, Angola
AO20	Luanda Province, Angola

== AR: Argentina ==
FIPS Code	Region
AR01	Buenos Aires Province, Argentina
AR02	Catamarca Province, Argentina
AR03	Chaco Province, Argentina
AR04	Chubut Province, Argentina
AR05	Córdoba Province, Argentina
AR06	Corrientes Province, Argentina
AR07	Distrito Federal, Argentina
AR08	Entre Ríos Province, Argentina
AR09	Formosa Province, Argentina
AR10	Jujuy Province, Argentina
AR11	La Pampa Province, Argentina
AR12	La Rioja Province, Argentina
AR13	Mendoza Province, Argentina
AR14	Misiones Province, Argentina
AR15	Neuquén Province, Argentina
AR16	Río Negro Province, Argentina
AR17	Salta Province, Argentina
AR18	San Juan Province, Argentina
AR19	San Luis Province, Argentina
AR20	Santa Cruz Province, Argentina
AR21	Santa Fe Province, Argentina
AR22	Santiago del Estero Province, Argentina
AR23	Tierra del Fuego, Antártida e Islas del Atlántico Sur Province, Argentina
AR24	Tucumán Province, Argentina

== AS: Australia ==
FIPS Code	Region
AS01	Australian Capital Territory, Australia
AS02	New South Wales State, Australia
AS03	Northern Territory, Australia
AS04	Queensland State, Australia
AS05	South Australia State, Australia
AS06	Tasmania State, Australia
AS07	Victoria State, Australia
AS08	Western Australia State, Australia

== AU: Austria ==
FIPS Code	Region
AU01	Burgenland State, Austria
AU02	Kärnten State, Austria
AU03	Niederösterreich State, Austria
AU04	Oberösterreich State, Austria
AU05	Salzburg State, Austria
AU06	Steiermark State, Austria
AU07	Tirol State, Austria
AU08	Vorarlberg State, Austria
AU09	Wien State, Austria

== BA: Bahrain ==
FIPS Code	Region
BA01	Al Ḩadd Municipality, Bahrain
BA02	Al Manāmah Municipality, Bahrain
BA05	Jidd Ḩafş Municipality, Bahrain
BA06	Sitrah Municipality, Bahrain
BA08	Al Minţaqah al Gharbīyah Municipality, Bahrain
BA09	Minţaqat Juzur Ḩawār, Bahrain
BA10	Al Minţaqah ash Shamālīyah Municipality, Bahrain
BA11	Al Minţaqah al Wusţá Municipality, Bahrain
BA12	Madīnat `Īsá Municipality, Bahrain
BA13	Ar Rifā` wa al Minţaqah al Janūbīyah Municipality, Bahrain
BA14	Madīnat Ḩamad Municipality, Bahrain
BA15	Al Muḩarraq Municipality, Bahrain
BA16	Al ٰĀşimah Municipality, Bahrain
BA17	Al Janūbīyah Municipality, Bahrain
BA18	Ash Shamālīyah Municipality, Bahrain
BA19	Al Wusţá Municipality, Bahrain

== BB: Barbados ==
FIPS Code	Region
BB01	Parish of Christ Church, Barbados
BB02	Parish of Saint Andrew, Barbados
BB03	Parish of Saint George, Barbados
BB04	Parish of Saint James, Barbados
BB05	Parish of Saint John, Barbados
BB06	Parish of Saint Joseph, Barbados
BB07	Parish of Saint Lucy, Barbados
BB08	Parish of Saint Michael, Barbados
BB09	Parish of Saint Peter, Barbados
BB10	Parish of Saint Philip, Barbados
BB11	Parish of Saint Thomas, Barbados

== BC: Botswana ==
FIPS Code	Region
BC01	Central District, Botswana
BC03	Ghanzi District, Botswana
BC04	Kgalagadi District, Botswana
BC05	Kgatleng District, Botswana
BC06	Kweneng District, Botswana
BC08	North East District, Botswana
BC09	South East District, Botswana
BC10	Southern District, Botswana
BC11	North West District, Botswana

== BD: Bermuda ==
FIPS Code	Region
BD01	Devonshire Parish, Bermuda
BD02	Hamilton Parish, Bermuda
BD03	Hamilton Municipality, Bermuda
BD04	Paget Parish, Bermuda
BD05	Pembroke Parish, Bermuda
BD06	Saint George Municipality, Bermuda
BD07	Saint George's Parish, Bermuda
BD08	Sandys Parish, Bermuda
BD09	Smith's Parish, Bermuda
BD10	Southampton Parish, Bermuda
BD11	Warwick Parish, Bermuda

== BE: Belgium ==
FIPS Code	Region
BE01	Antwerpen Province, Belgium
BE03	Hainaut Province, Belgium
BE04	Liège Province, Belgium
BE05	Limburg Province, Belgium
BE06	Luxembourg Province, Belgium
BE07	Namur Province, Belgium
BE08	East Flanders Province, Belgium
BE09	West Flanders Province, Belgium
BE10	Walloon Brabant Province, Belgium
BE11	Brussels-Capital Region, Belgium
BE12	Flemish Brabant Province, Belgium

== BF: The Bahamas ==
FIPS Code	Region
BF05	Bimini District, The Bahamas
BF06	Cat Island District, The Bahamas
BF10	Exuma District, The Bahamas
BF13	Inagua District, The Bahamas
BF15	Long Island District, The Bahamas
BF16	Mayaguana District, The Bahamas
BF18	Ragged Island District, The Bahamas
BF22	Harbour Island District, The Bahamas
BF23	New Providence District, The Bahamas
BF24	Acklins and Crooked Islands District, The Bahamas
BF25	Freeport District, The Bahamas
BF26	Fresh Creek District, The Bahamas
BF27	Governor's Harbour District, The Bahamas
BF28	Green Turtle Cay District, The Bahamas
BF29	High Rock District, The Bahamas
BF30	Kemps Bay District, The Bahamas
BF31	Marsh Harbour District, The Bahamas
BF32	Nichollstown and Berry Islands District, The Bahamas
BF33	Rock Sound District, The Bahamas
BF34	Sandy Point District, The Bahamas
BF35	San Salvador and Rum Cay District, The Bahamas

== BG: Bangladesh ==
FIPS Code	Region
BG81	Dhaka Division, Bangladesh
BG82	Khulna Division, Bangladesh
BG83	Rājshāhi Division, Bangladesh
BG84	Chittagong Division, Bangladesh
BG85	Barisāl Division, Bangladesh
BG86	Sylhet Division, Bangladesh

== BH: Belize ==
FIPS Code	Region
BH01	Belize District, Belize
BH02	Cayo District, Belize
BH03	Corozal District, Belize
BH04	Orange Walk District, Belize
BH05	Stann Creek District, Belize
BH06	Toledo District, Belize

== BK: Bosnia and Herzegovina ==
FIPS Code	Region
BK01	Federacija Bosne i Hercegovine, Bosnia and Herzegovina
BK02	Republika Srpska, Bosnia and Herzegovina

== BL: Bolivia ==
FIPS Code	Region
BL01	Chuquisaca Department, Bolivia
BL02	Cochabamba Department, Bolivia
BL03	Beni Department, Bolivia
BL04	La Paz Department, Bolivia
BL05	Oruro Department, Bolivia
BL06	Pando Department, Bolivia
BL07	Potosí Department, Bolivia
BL08	Santa Cruz Department, Bolivia
BL09	Tarija Department, Bolivia

== BM: Burma ==
FIPS Code	Region
BM01	Rakhine State, Burma
BM02	Chin State, Burma
BM03	Ayeyarwady Division, Burma
BM04	Kachin State, Burma
BM05	Kayin State, Burma
BM06	Kayah State, Burma
BM08	Mandalay Division, Burma
BM10	Sagaing Division, Burma
BM11	Shan State, Burma
BM12	Tanintharyi Division, Burma
BM13	Mon State, Burma
BM15	Magway Division, Burma
BM16	Bago Division, Burma
BM17	Yangon Division, Burma

== BN: Benin ==
FIPS Code	Region
BN07	Alibori Department, Benin
BN08	Atakora Department, Benin
BN09	Atlantique Department, Benin
BN10	Borgou Department, Benin
BN11	Collines Department, Benin
BN12	Kouffo Department, Benin
BN13	Donga Department, Benin
BN14	Littoral Department, Benin
BN15	Mono Department, Benin
BN16	Ouémé Department, Benin
BN17	Plateau Department, Benin
BN18	Zou Department, Benin

== BO: Belarus ==
FIPS Code	Region
BO01	Brest Province, Belarus
BO02	Homyel Province, Belarus
BO03	Hrodna Province, Belarus
BO04	Minsk City, Belarus
BO05	Minsk Province, Belarus
BO06	Mahilyow Province, Belarus
BO07	Vitsebsk Province, Belarus

== BP: Solomon Islands ==
FIPS Code	Region
BP03	Malaita Province, Solomon Islands
BP06	Guadalcanal Province, Solomon Islands
BP07	Isabel Province, Solomon Islands
BP08	Makira Province, Solomon Islands
BP09	Temotu Province, Solomon Islands
BP10	Central Province, Solomon Islands
BP11	Western Province, Solomon Islands
BP12	Choiseul Province, Solomon Islands
BP13	Rennell and Bellona Province, Solomon Islands

== BR: Brazil ==
FIPS Code	Region
BR01	Acre State, Brazil
BR02	Alagoas State, Brazil
BR03	Amapá State, Brazil
BR04	Amazonas State, Brazil
BR05	Bahia State, Brazil
BR06	Ceará State, Brazil
BR07	Distrito Federal Federal District, Brazil
BR08	Espírito Santo State, Brazil
BR11	Mato Grosso do Sul State, Brazil
BR13	Maranhão State, Brazil
BR14	Mato Grosso State, Brazil
BR15	Minas Gerais State, Brazil
BR16	Pará State, Brazil
BR17	Paraíba State, Brazil
BR18	Paraná State, Brazil
BR20	Piauí State, Brazil
BR21	Rio de Janeiro State, Brazil
BR22	Rio Grande do Norte State, Brazil
BR23	Rio Grande do Sul State, Brazil
BR24	Rondônia State, Brazil
BR25	Roraima State, Brazil
BR26	Santa Catarina State, Brazil
BR27	São Paulo State, Brazil
BR28	Sergipe State, Brazil
BR29	Goiás State, Brazil
BR30	Pernambuco State, Brazil
BR31	Tocantins State, Brazil

== BT: Bhutan ==
FIPS Code	Region
BT05	Bumthang District, Bhutan
BT06	Chhukha District, Bhutan
BT07	Tsirang (Chirang) District, Bhutan
BT08	Dagana District, Bhutan
BT09	Sarpang (Geylegphug) District, Bhutan
BT10	Haa (Ha) District, Bhutan
BT11	Lhuntse (Lhuntshi) District, Bhutan
BT12	Mongar District, Bhutan
BT13	Paro District, Bhutan
BT14	Pemagatshel (Pemagatsel) District, Bhutan
BT15	Punakha District, Bhutan
BT16	Samtse (Samchi) District, Bhutan
BT17	Samdrup Jongkhar District, Bhutan
BT18	Zhemgang (Shemgang) District, Bhutan
BT19	Trashigang (Tashigang) District, Bhutan
BT20	Thimphu District, Bhutan
BT21	Trongsa (Tongsa) District, Bhutan
BT22	Wangdue Phodrang (Wangdi Phodrang) District, Bhutan

== BU: Bulgaria ==
FIPS Code	Region
BU38	Blagoevgrad Province, Bulgaria
BU39	Burgas Province, Bulgaria
BU40	Dobrich Province, Bulgaria
BU41	Gabrovo Province, Bulgaria
BU42	Sofiya-Grad Province, Bulgaria
BU43	Haskovo Province, Bulgaria
BU44	Kardzhali Province, Bulgaria
BU45	Kyustendil Province, Bulgaria
BU46	Lovech Province, Bulgaria
BU47	Montana Province, Bulgaria
BU48	Pazardzhik Province, Bulgaria
BU49	Pernik Province, Bulgaria
BU50	Pleven Province, Bulgaria
BU51	Plovdiv Province, Bulgaria
BU52	Razgrad Province, Bulgaria
BU53	Ruse Province, Bulgaria
BU54	Shumen Province, Bulgaria
BU55	Silistra Province, Bulgaria
BU56	Sliven Province, Bulgaria
BU57	Smolyan Province, Bulgaria
BU58	Sofia Province, Bulgaria
BU59	Stara Zagora Province, Bulgaria
BU60	Targovishte Province, Bulgaria
BU61	Varna Province, Bulgaria
BU62	Veliko Tarnovo Province, Bulgaria
BU63	Vidin Province, Bulgaria
BU64	Vratsa Province, Bulgaria
BU65	Yambol Province, Bulgaria

== BX: Brunei ==
FIPS Code	Region
BX01	Belait District, Brunei
BX02	Brunei-Muara District, Brunei
BX03	Temburong District, Brunei
BX04	Tutong District, Brunei

== BY: Burundi ==
FIPS Code	Region
BY02	Bujumbura Province, Burundi
BY09	Bubanza Province, Burundi
BY10	Bururi Province, Burundi
BY11	Cankuzo Province, Burundi
BY12	Cibitoke Province, Burundi
BY13	Gitega Province, Burundi
BY14	Karuzi Province, Burundi
BY15	Kayanza Province, Burundi
BY16	Kirundo Province, Burundi
BY17	Makamba Province, Burundi
BY18	Muyinga Province, Burundi
BY19	Ngozi Province, Burundi
BY20	Rutana Province, Burundi
BY21	Ruyigi Province, Burundi
BY22	Muramvya Province, Burundi
BY23	Mwaro Province, Burundi

== CA: Canada ==
FIPS Code	Region
CA01	Alberta, Canada
CA02	British Columbia, Canada
CA03	Manitoba, Canada
CA04	New Brunswick, Canada
CA05	Newfoundland and Labrador, Canada
CA07	Nova Scotia, Canada
CA08	Ontario, Canada
CA09	Prince Edward Island, Canada
CA10	Quebec, Canada
CA11	Saskatchewan, Canada
CA12	Yukon, Canada
CA13	Northwest Territories, Canada
CA14	Nunavut, Canada

== CB: Cambodia ==
FIPS Code	Region
CB02	Kâmpóng Cham Province, Cambodia
CB03	Kâmpóng Chhnăng Province, Cambodia
CB04	Kâmpóng Spœ Province, Cambodia
CB05	Kâmpóng Thum Province, Cambodia
CB07	Kândal Province, Cambodia
CB08	Kaôh Kŏng Province, Cambodia
CB09	Krâchéh Province, Cambodia
CB10	Môndôl Kĭri Province, Cambodia
CB12	Poŭthĭsăt Province, Cambodia
CB13	Preăh Vĭhar Province, Cambodia
CB14	Prey Vêng Province, Cambodia
CB17	Stœ̆ng Trêng Province, Cambodia
CB18	Svay Riĕng Province, Cambodia
CB19	Ta Kêv Province, Cambodia
CB21	Kâmpôt Province, Cambodia
CB22	Phnum Pénh Municipality, Cambodia
CB23	Rôtânôkĭri Province, Cambodia
CB24	Siĕm Réab Province, Cambodia
CB25	Bântéay Méan Choăy Province, Cambodia
CB26	Kêb Municipality, Cambodia
CB27	Ŏtdâr Méan Choăy Province, Cambodia
CB28	Preăh Seihânŭ Municipality, Cambodia
CB29	Băt Dâmbâng Province, Cambodia
CB30	Pailĭn Province, Cambodia

== CD: Chad ==
FIPS Code	Region
CD01	Batha Region, Chad
CD02	Wadi Fira Region, Chad
CD03	Borkou-Ennedi-Tibesti Region, Chad
CD05	Guéra Region, Chad
CD06	Kanem Region, Chad
CD07	Lac Region, Chad
CD08	Logone Occidental Region, Chad
CD09	Logone Oriental Region, Chad
CD12	Ouaddaï Region, Chad
CD13	Salamat Region, Chad
CD14	Tandjilé Region, Chad
CD15	Chari-Baguirmi Region, Chad
CD16	Mayo-Kebbi Est Region, Chad
CD17	Moyen-Chari Region, Chad
CD18	Hadjer-Lamis Region, Chad
CD19	Mandoul Region, Chad
CD20	Mayo-Kebbi Ouest Region, Chad
CD21	Ville de N'Djamena, Chad

== CE: Sri Lanka ==
FIPS Code	Region
CE01	Amparai District, Sri Lanka
CE02	Anuradhapura District, Sri Lanka
CE03	Badulla District, Sri Lanka
CE04	Batticaloa District, Sri Lanka
CE06	Galle District, Sri Lanka
CE07	Hambantota District, Sri Lanka
CE09	Kalutara District, Sri Lanka
CE10	Kandy District, Sri Lanka
CE11	Kegalla District, Sri Lanka
CE12	Kurunegala District, Sri Lanka
CE14	Matale District, Sri Lanka
CE15	Matara District, Sri Lanka
CE16	Moneragala District, Sri Lanka
CE17	Nuwara Eliya District, Sri Lanka
CE18	Polonnaruwa District, Sri Lanka
CE19	Puttalam District, Sri Lanka
CE20	Ratnapura District, Sri Lanka
CE21	Trincomalee District, Sri Lanka
CE23	Colombo District, Sri Lanka
CE24	Gampaha District, Sri Lanka
CE25	Jaffna District, Sri Lanka
CE26	Mannar District, Sri Lanka
CE27	Mullaittivu District, Sri Lanka
CE28	Vavuniya District, Sri Lanka

== CF: Congo ==
FIPS Code	Region
CF01	Bouenza Region, Congo
CF04	Kouilou Region, Congo
CF05	Lékoumou Region, Congo
CF06	Likouala Region, Congo
CF07	Niari Region, Congo
CF08	Plateaux Region, Congo
CF10	Sangha Region, Congo
CF11	Pool Region, Congo
CF12	Brazzaville Commune, Congo
CF13	Cuvette Region, Congo
CF14	Cuvette-Ouest Region, Congo

== CG: Democratic Republic of the Congo ==
FIPS Code	Region
CG01	Bandundu Province, Democratic Republic of the Congo
CG02	Équateur Province, Democratic Republic of the Congo
CG03	Kasaï-Occidental Province, Democratic Republic of the Congo
CG04	Kasaï-Oriental Province, Democratic Republic of the Congo
CG05	Katanga Province, Democratic Republic of the Congo
CG06	Kinshasa City, Democratic Republic of the Congo
CG08	Bas-Congo Province, Democratic Republic of the Congo
CG09	Orientale Province, Democratic Republic of the Congo
CG10	Maniema Province, Democratic Republic of the Congo
CG11	North Kivu Province, Democratic Republic of the Congo
CG12	South Kivu Province, Democratic Republic of the Congo

== CH: China ==
FIPS Code	Region
CH01	Anhui Province, China
CH02	Zhejiang Province, China
CH03	Jiangxi Province, China
CH04	Jiangsu Province, China
CH05	Jilin Province, China
CH06	Qinghai Province, China
CH07	Fujian Province, China
CH08	Heilongjiang Province, China
CH09	Henan Province, China
CH10	Hebei Province, China
CH11	Hunan Province, China
CH12	Hubei Province, China
CH13	Xinjiang Autonomous Region, China
CH14	Xizang Autonomous Region, China
CH15	Gansu Province, China
CH16	Guangxi Autonomous Region, China
CH18	Guizhou Province, China
CH19	Liaoning Province, China
CH20	Nei Mongol Autonomous Region, China
CH21	Ningxia Autonomous Region, China
CH22	Beijing Municipality, China
CH23	Shanghai Municipality, China
CH24	Shanxi Province, China
CH25	Shandong Province, China
CH26	Shaanxi Province, China
CH28	Tianjin Municipality, China
CH29	Yunnan Province, China
CH30	Guangdong Province, China
CH31	Hainan Province, China
CH32	Sichuan Province, China
CH33	Chongqing Municipality, China

== CI: Chile ==
FIPS Code	Region
CI01	Valparaíso Region, Chile
CI02	Aisén del General Carlos Ibáñez del Campo Region, Chile
CI03	Antofagasta Region, Chile
CI04	Araucanía Region, Chile
CI05	Atacama Region, Chile
CI06	Biobío Region, Chile
CI07	Coquimbo Region, Chile
CI08	Libertador General Bernardo O'Higgins Region, Chile
CI10	Magallanes y Antártica Chilena Region, Chile
CI11	Maule Region, Chile
CI12	Santiago Metropolitan Region, Chile
CI14	Los Lagos Region, Chile
CI15	Tarapacá Region, Chile
CI16	Arica y Parinacota Region, Chile
CI17	Los Ríos Region, Chile

== CJ: Cayman Islands ==
FIPS Code	Region
CJ01	Creek District, Cayman Islands
CJ02	Eastern District, Cayman Islands
CJ03	Midland District, Cayman Islands
CJ04	South Town District, Cayman Islands
CJ05	Spot Bay District, Cayman Islands
CJ06	Stake Bay District, Cayman Islands
CJ07	West End District, Cayman Islands
CJ08	Western District, Cayman Islands

== CM: Cameroon ==
FIPS Code	Region
CM04	East Province
CM05	Littoral Province
CM07	Northwest Province
CM08	West Province
CM09	Southwest Province
CM10	Adamawa Province
CM11	Centre Province
CM12	Far North Province
CM13	North Province
CM14	South Province

== CN: Comoros ==
FIPS Code	Region
CN01	Anjouan Island, Comoros
CN02	Grande Comore Island, Comoros
CN03	Mohéli Island, Comoros

== CO: Colombia ==
FIPS Code	Region
CO01	Amazonas Department, Colombia
CO02	Antioquia Department, Colombia
CO03	Arauca Department, Colombia
CO04	Atlántico Department, Colombia
CO08	Caquetá Department, Colombia
CO09	Cauca Department, Colombia
CO10	Cesar Department, Colombia
CO11	Chocó Department, Colombia
CO12	Córdoba Department, Colombia
CO14	Guaviare Department, Colombia
CO15	Guainía Department, Colombia
CO16	Huila Department, Colombia
CO17	Guajira Department, Colombia
CO19	Meta Department, Colombia
CO20	Nariño Department, Colombia
CO21	Norte de Santander Department, Colombia
CO22	Putumayo Department, Colombia
CO23	Quindío Department, Colombia
CO24	Risaralda Department, Colombia
CO25	San Andrés and Providencia Department, Colombia
CO26	Santander Department, Colombia
CO27	Sucre Department, Colombia
CO28	Tolima Department, Colombia
CO29	Valle del Cauca Department, Colombia
CO30	Vaupés Department, Colombia
CO31	Vichada Department, Colombia
CO32	Casanare Department, Colombia
CO33	Cundinamarca Department, Colombia
CO34	Bogotá Capital District, Colombia
CO35	Bolívar Department, Colombia
CO36	Boyacá Department, Colombia
CO37	Caldas Department, Colombia
CO38	Magdalena Department, Colombia

== CS: Costa Rica ==
FIPS Code	Region
CS01	Alajuela Province, Costa Rica
CS02	Cartago Province, Costa Rica
CS03	Guanacaste Province, Costa Rica
CS04	Heredia Province, Costa Rica
CS06	Limón Province, Costa Rica
CS07	Puntarenas Province, Costa Rica
CS08	San José Province, Costa Rica

== CT: Central African Republic ==
FIPS Code	Region
CT01	Bamingui-Bangoran Prefecture, Central African Republic
CT02	Basse-Kotto Prefecture, Central African Republic
CT03	Haute-Kotto Prefecture, Central African Republic
CT04	Mambéré-Kadéï Prefecture, Central African Republic
CT05	Haut-Mbomou Prefecture, Central African Republic
CT06	Kémo Prefecture, Central African Republic
CT07	Lobaye Prefecture, Central African Republic
CT08	Mbomou Prefecture, Central African Republic
CT09	Nana-Mambéré Prefecture, Central African Republic
CT11	Ouaka Prefecture, Central African Republic
CT12	Ouham Prefecture, Central African Republic
CT13	Ouham-Pendé Prefecture, Central African Republic
CT14	Vakaga Prefecture, Central African Republic
CT15	Nana-Grébizi Economic Prefecture, Central African Republic
CT16	Sangha-Mbaéré Economic Prefecture, Central African Republic
CT17	Ombella-Mpoko Prefecture, Central African Republic
CT18	Bangui Commune, Central African Republic

== CU: Cuba ==
FIPS Code	Region
CU01	Pinar del Río Province, Cuba
CU02	Ciudad de La Habana Province, Cuba
CU03	Matanzas Province, Cuba
CU04	Isla de la Juventud Special Municipality, Cuba
CU05	Camagüey Province, Cuba
CU07:	Ciego de Ávila Province, Cuba
CU08	Cienfuegos Province, Cuba
CU09	Granma Province, Cuba
CU10	Guantánamo Province, Cuba
CU11	La Habana Province, Cuba
CU12	Holguín Province, Cuba
CU13	Las Tunas Province, Cuba
CU14	Sancti Spíritus Province, Cuba
CU15	Santiago de Cuba Province, Cuba
CU16	Villa Clara Province, Cuba

== CV: Cape Verde ==
FIPS Code	Region
CV01	Boa Vista District, Cape Verde
CV02	Brava District, Cape Verde
CV04	Maio District, Cape Verde
CV05	Paul District, Cape Verde
CV07	Ribeira Grande District, Cape Verde
CV08	Sal District, Cape Verde
CV10	São Nicolau District, Cape Verde
CV11	São Vicente District, Cape Verde
CV13	Mosteiros District, Cape Verde
CV14	Praia District, Cape Verde
CV15	Santa Catarina District, Cape Verde
CV16	Santa Cruz District, Cape Verde
CV17	São Domingos District, Cape Verde
CV18	São Filipe District, Cape Verde
CV19	São Miguel District, Cape Verde
CV20	Tarrafal District, Cape Verde

== CY: Cyprus ==
FIPS Code	Region
CY01	Famagusta District, Cyprus
CY02	Kyrenia District, Cyprus
CY03	Larnaca District, Cyprus
CY04	Nicosia District, Cyprus
CY05	Limassol District, Cyprus
CY06	Paphos District, Cyprus

== See also ==
- List of FIPS region codes (D-F)
- List of FIPS region codes (G-I)
- List of FIPS region codes (J-L)
- List of FIPS region codes (M-O)
- List of FIPS region codes (P-R)
- List of FIPS region codes (S-U)
- List of FIPS region codes (V-Z)

== Sources ==
- FIPS 10-4 Codes and history
  - Last version of codes
  - All codes (include earlier versions)
  - Table to see the evolution of the codes over time
- Administrative Divisions of Countries ("Statoids"), Statoids.com
