= ISO 3166-2:BH =

Entry for Bahrain in ISO 3166-2

ISO 3166-2:BH is the entry for Bahrain in ISO 3166-2, part of the ISO 3166 standard published by the International Organization for Standardization (ISO), which defines codes for the names of the principal subdivisions (e.g., provinces or states) of all countries coded in ISO 3166-1.

Currently for Bahrain, ISO 3166-2 codes are defined for four governorates. Each code consists of two parts, separated by a hyphen. The first part is BH, the ISO 3166-1 alpha-2 code of Bahrain. The second part is two digits (13–17, with the exception of 16, which was assigned to Al Wusţá before its abolition in 2014).

== Current codes ==
Subdivision names are listed as in the ISO 3166-2 standard published by the ISO 3166 Maintenance Agency (ISO 3166/MA).

Click on the button in the header to sort each column.

Code	Subdivision name (ar) (BGN/PCGN 1956)	Local variant	Subdivision name (ar) (Note: For reference only, Arabic name in Arabic script not included in the ISO 3166-2 standard.)	Subdivision name (en) (Note: For reference only, English name not included in the ISO 3166-2 standard.)
BH-13	Al ‘Āşimah	Al Manāmah	محافظة العاصمة	Capital Governorate
BH-14	Al Janūbīyah		المحافظة الجنوبية	Southern Governorate
BH-15	Al Muḩarraq		محافظة المحرق	Muharraq Governorate
BH-17	Ash Shamālīyah		المحافظة الشمالية	Northern Governorate

== Changes ==
The following changes to the entry have been announced in newsletters by the ISO 3166/MA since the first publication of ISO 3166-2 in 1998. ISO stopped issuing newsletters in 2013.

Newsletter	Date issued	Description of change in newsletter	Code/Subdivision change
Newsletter I-8	2007-04-17	Modification of the administrative structure	Subdivision layout: 12 regions (see below) → 5 governorates

The following changes to the entry are listed on ISO's online catalogue, the Online Browsing Platform:

Effective date of change	Short description of change (en)
2015-11-27	Change of subdivision name for BH-13; deletion of a governorate BH-16; update List Source

=== Codes before Newsletter I-8 ===
Former code	Subdivision name (ar) (BGN/PCGN 1956)
BH-01	Al Ḩadd
BH-03	Al Manāmah
BH-10	Al Minţaqah al Gharbīyah
BH-07	Al Minţaqah al Wusţá
BH-05	Al Minţaqah ash Shamālīyah
BH-02	Al Muḩarraq
BH-09	Ar Rifāٰ
BH-04	Jidd Ḩafş
BH-12	Madīnat Ḩamad
BH-08	Madīnat ٰĪsá
BH-11	Minţaqat Juzur Ḩawār
BH-06	Sitrah

== See also ==
- Subdivisions of Bahrain
- FIPS region codes of Bahrain
