= Former regions of Bahrain =

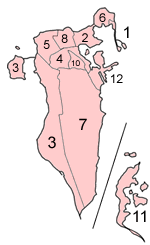
Map of Bahrain showing municipalities

Bahrain was formerly split into twelve regions (mintaqah) that were all administered from the capital city of Manama. On July 3, 2002, these were superseded by the five Governorates of Bahrain (four as of September 2014, with the abolishment of the Central Governorate).

1. Al Hadd
2. Al Manamah
3. Al Mintaqah al Gharbiyah (Western)
4. Al Mintaqah al Wusta (Central)
5. Al Mintaqah al Shamaliyah (Northern)
6. Al Muharraq
7. Ar Rifa' wa al Mintaqah al Janubiyah (Rifa and Southern)
8. Jidd Haffs
9. Madinat Hamad
10. Madinat 'Isa
11. Juzur Hawar
12. Sitrah

The map does not show Madinat Hamad, which was split off from Ar Rifa' wa al Mintaqah al Janubiyah in 1991.

The following map does not show Hamad Town, which was split off from Rifa and Southern Region in 1991.

Map	Former Municipality
1. Al Hidd
2. Manama
3. Western Region
4. Central Region
5. Northern Region
6. Muharraq
7. Rifa and Southern Region
8. Jidd Haffs
9. Hamad Town
10. Isa Town
11. Hawar Islands
12. Sitra
