= South Sitra Island =

Island in Bahrain

South Sitra
Native name: سترة
- Location within Bahrain

Geography
- Location: Persian Gulf
- Coordinates: 26.11°N 50.635°E
- Archipelago: Bahrain
- Adjacent to: Persian Gulf
- Total islands: 1
- Major islands: South Sitra
- Area: 0.1 km^{2} (0.039 sq mi)
- Length: 0.2 km (0.12 mi)
- Width: 0.35 km (0.217 mi)
- Coastline: 1.2 km (0.75 mi)
- Highest elevation: 0 m (0 ft)

Administration
- Bahrain
- Governorate: Southern Governorate
- Largest settlement: South Sitra Palace (pop. 0)

Demographics
- Demonym: Bahraini
- Population: 0 (2016)
- Pop. density: 0/km^{2} (0/sq mi)
- Ethnic groups: Bahraini, non-Bahraini

Additional information
- Time zone: AST (UTC+3)
- ISO code: BH-14
- Official website: www.bahrain.com

South Sitra (Arabic: سترة or سِتْرَة) is an island in Bahrain. It lies 12.5 km (7.8 mi) south of the capital, Manama, on Bahrain Island.

== History ==
It is the location of Sitra Palace.

== Geography ==
The Island is located just south of Sitra in the Persian Gulf. The island's western coast forms the boundary of Tubli Bay. to the South of it is the new reclamation project of Sitra Technology Park Islands.

== Transportation ==
The South Sitra Causeway connects it to Sitra Island.

== Administration ==
The island belongs to Southern Governorate.

== Image gallery ==
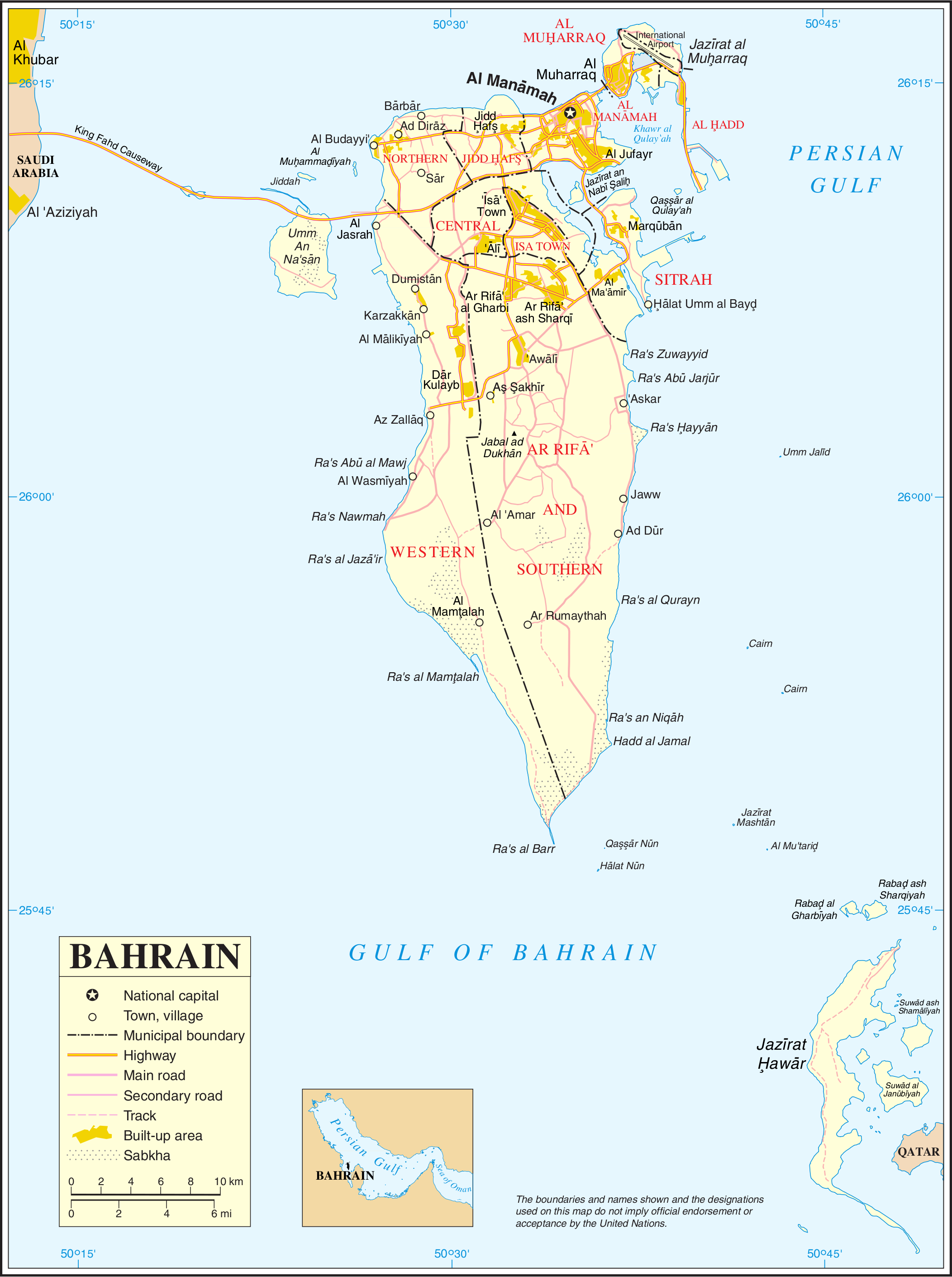
Map 1

District Map

== See also ==
- List of islands of Bahrain
