= Durrat Al Bahrain =

Artificial island in Bahrain

Native name: درة البحرين (Arabic)
- Location within Bahrain

Geography
- Location: Persian Gulf
- Coordinates: 25.84°N 50.60°E
- Archipelago: Bahrain
- Adjacent to: Persian Gulf
- Total islands: 15
- Major islands: Atol 1 Atol 2 Atol 3 Atol 4 Atol 5 Atol 6 Petal 1 Petal 2 Petal 3 Petal 4 Petal 5 Crescent Island; Durrat Al Bahrain resort
- Area: 5.00 km^{2} (1.93 sq mi)
- Highest elevation: 0 m (0 ft)

Administration
- Bahrain
- Governorate: Southern Governorate
- Largest settlement: Atol 1 (pop. 870)

Demographics
- Demonym: Bahraini
- Population: 1000 (2010)
- Pop. density: 200/km^{2} (500/sq mi)
- Ethnic groups: Bahraini, non-Bahraini

Additional information
- Time zone: AST (UTC+3)
- ISO code: BH-14
- Official website: www.durratbahrain.com

Durrat Al Bahrain (Arabic: درة البحرين) is the third largest artificial island in Bahrain after Northern City and Diyar Al Muharraq Islands. It lies 40.5 km (25.2 mi) south of the capital, Manama, on Bahrain Island.

== Description ==
Durrat Al Bahrain islands include luxury villas with either sea or beach views, parks, sports facilities, mosques, shops, restaurants, 12 bridges, and a marina. The project has a cost of about US$1.3 billion.

The marina is a joint venture between the Bahraini government and Kuwait Finance House, one of the GCC region's leading banks. The marina development is the first of its type and size in the Middle East.

== History ==
In 2002, plans were laid down for the project. Work began in 2004. In February 2008, work on the project was interrupted as more than 1,300 laborers laid down tools in a dispute over pay. Workers who were based at a laborers' camp on the development site, went on strike demanding better salaries and complaining of poor living conditions. The strike was called off soon after.

== Geography ==
The project consists of a series of 15 large artificial islands, covering an area of about 5 km^{2} (1.9 mi^{2}). It has six atolls, five fish-shaped islands, two crescent-shaped islands, and two more small islands related to the Marina area.

== Administration ==
The island belongs to Southern Governorate. The Development Company established an organization to manage the ongoing operation of the development. Julian Butson was appointed as the first chief executive officer of Durrat Resort Management.

== Transportation ==
The islands have two causeways connecting them to Bahrain Island.

== Image gallery ==
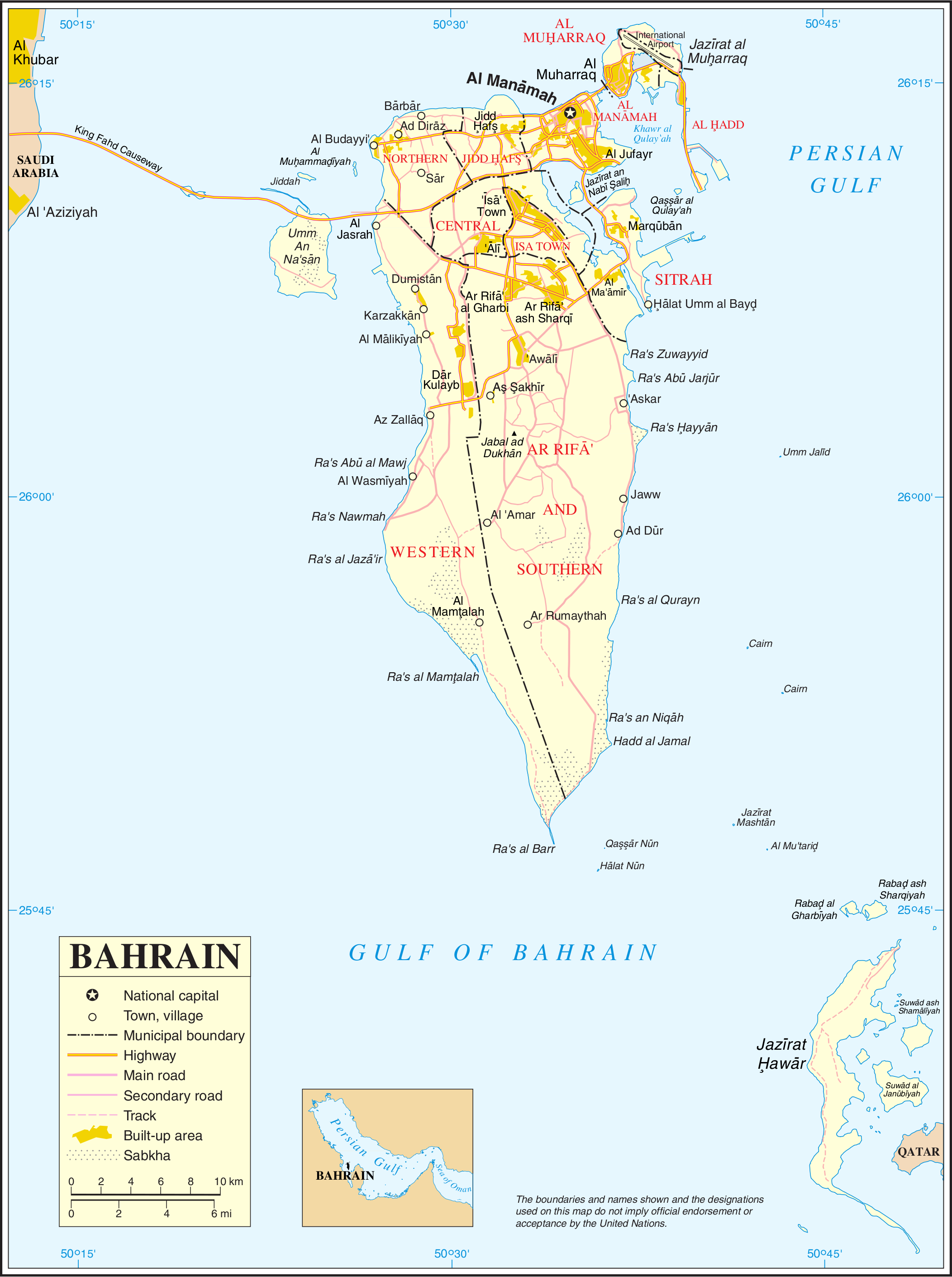
Map 1

District Map

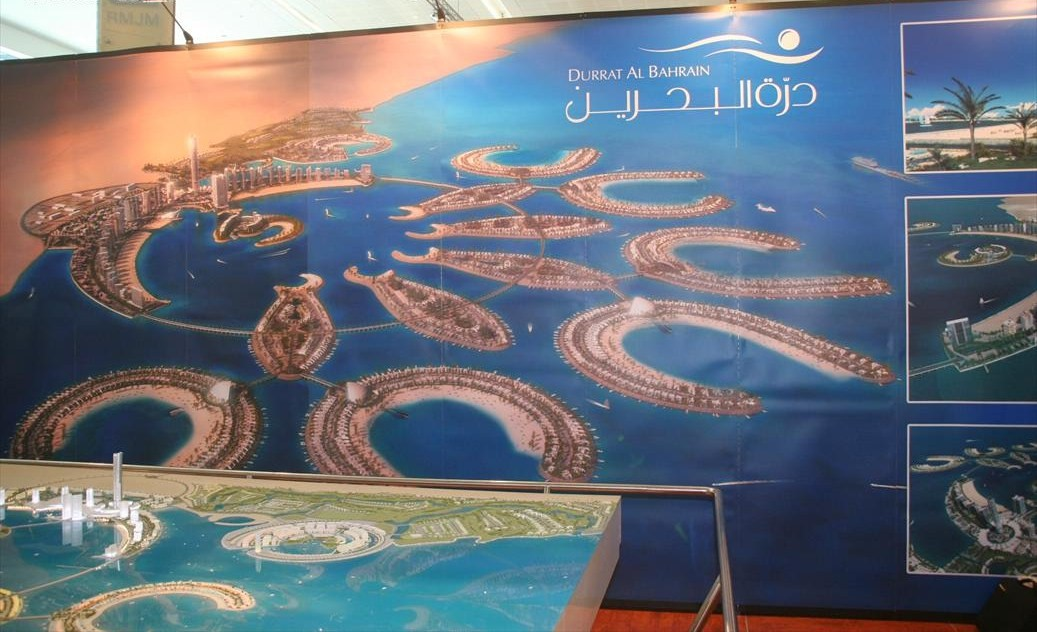
Promotional poster of the islands

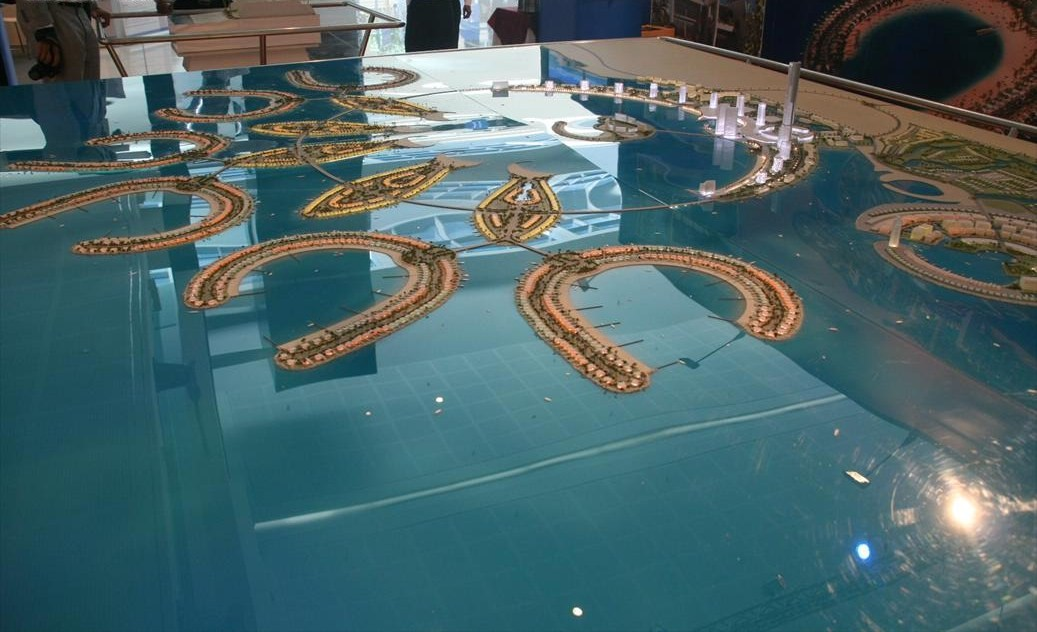
Model of Durrat Al Bahrain as seen at Cityscape Abu Dhabi 2007.

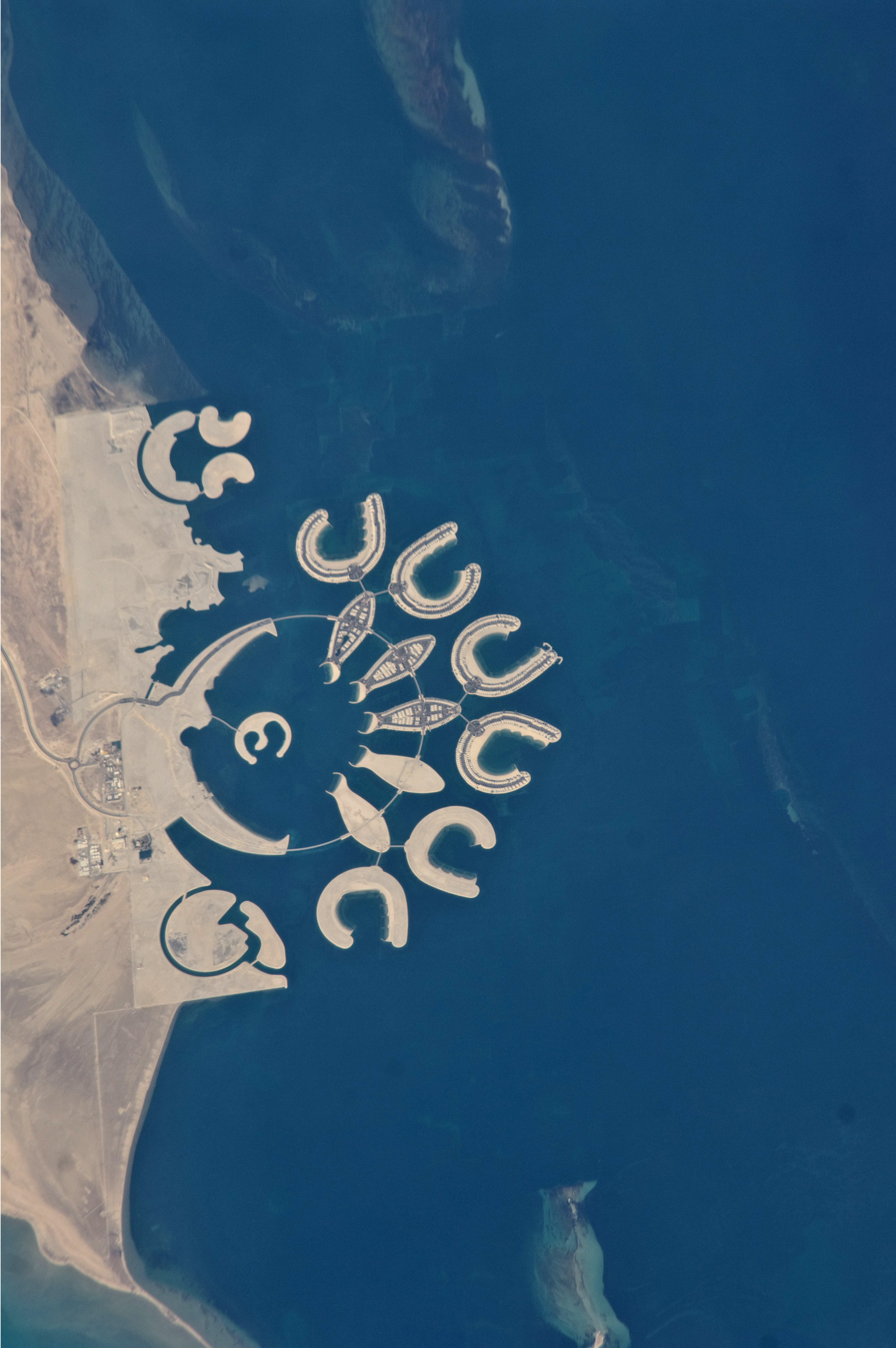
Astronaut photograph of Durrat Al Bahrain.

== See also ==
- List of islands of Bahrain
