= Salman Town =

Bahrain's island

Native name: مدينة سلمان (Arabic)
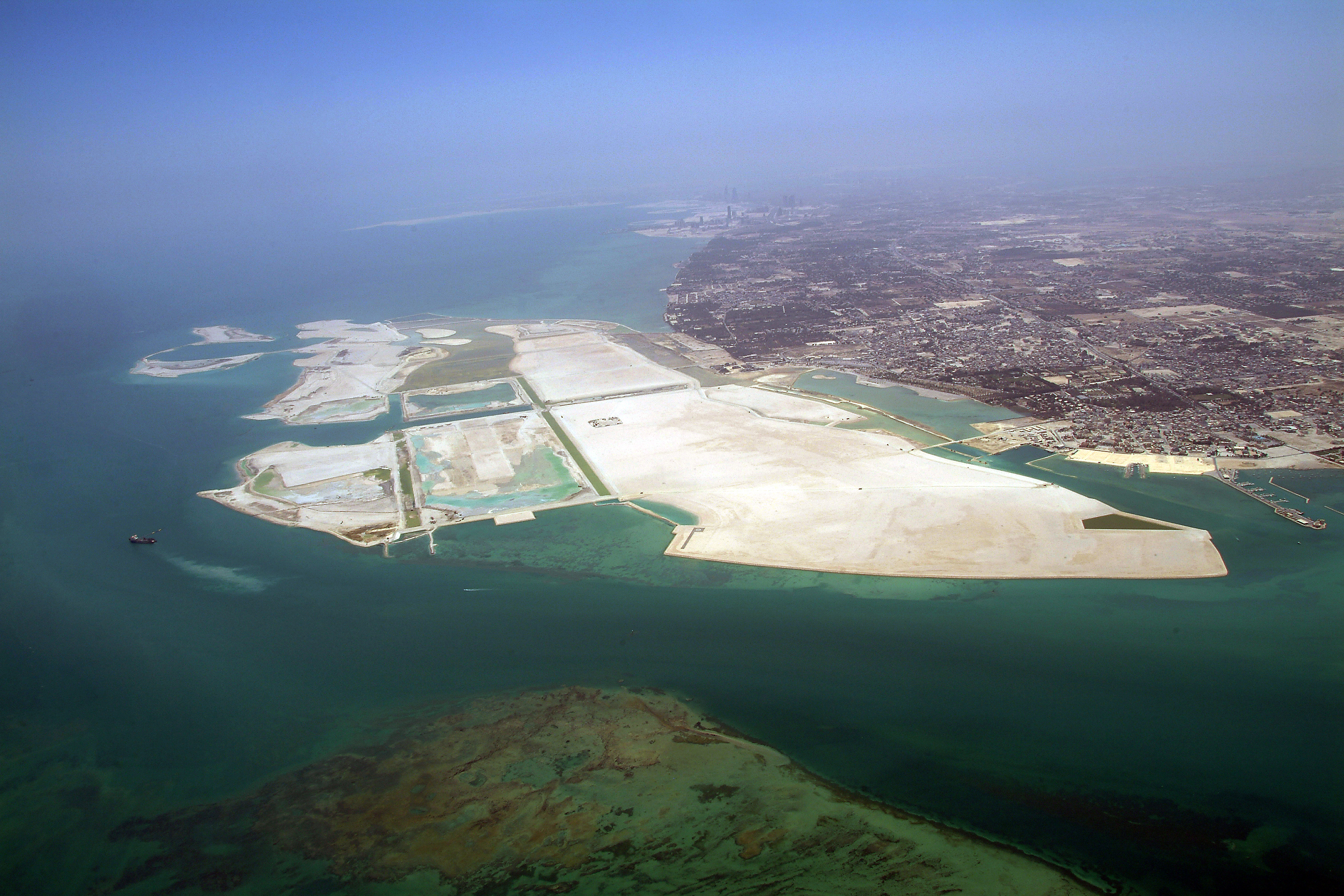
- Salman Town in 2007

- Location within Bahrain

Geography
- Location: Persian Gulf
- Coordinates: 26.24°N 50.47°E
- Archipelago: Bahrain
- Adjacent to: Persian Gulf
- Total islands: 1
- Major islands: Salman Town
- Area: 7 km^{2} (2.7 sq mi)
- Highest elevation: 0 m (0 ft)

Administration
- Bahrain
- Governorate: Northern Governorate

Demographics
- Demonym: Bahraini
- Ethnic groups: Bahraini, non-Bahraini

Additional information
- Time zone: AST (UTC+3)
- ISO code: BH-14

Salman Town (Arabic: مدينة سلمان), previously known as Northern City (Arabic: المدينة الشمالية), is a town built on reclaimed islands in northwestern Bahrain. Situated approximately 9 km (5.6 mi) west of the capital, Manama, and built as a social housing project, it is believed to be Bahrain's largest housing project constructed.

== History ==
The proposed plan for the city was made in 2000. It is a residential area that is being reclaimed and constructed by the Ministry of Housing in Bahrain. The project involves 37.5 million cubic metres of land being reclaimed from the sea along the northwestern shores of Bahrain. The core of the project involves more than 4,100 housing units, of which 3,110 are social housing units on islands created through land reclamation. The project, costing about BD208 million ($551.7 million), started in January 2012 and was expected to be completed in January 2018. In June 2014 work on phase 2 began by Aresco and Tamkon. In May 2015 work on phase 4 began. In February 2016, work on phase 4 began, by SSH Holdings, on islands 13–14 on the eastern part.

The town welcomed its first residents in May 2018 by the Crown Prince of Bahrain Salman bin Hamad Al Khalifa, after whom the development was renamed after. Salman Town is made up of 15,000 affordable homes including 10,000 apartments and 5,000 villas. It is estimated to support a population of 90,000 residents. The development also includes 40km of coastline, multiple recreational parks and promenades, alongside dedicated bicycle lanes. Other facilities constructed include a sports city and water desalination plant with a capacity of 40,000 cubic metres of distilled water.

The town received praise at the COP28 climate change conference in 2023 for its sustainability. In January 2026, plans for further development of Salman Town's waterfront were announced by the Northern Municipal Council.

== Local government ==
The island belongs to Northern Governorate and is managed by the Northern Municipal Council.

== Transportation ==
There are two causeways connecting Salman Town with the main Bahrain Island:

- Jid al Haj Bridge
- Diraz Bridge

A future causeway called the Gulf Drive will connect the islands to Muharraq Island through all reclaimed islands in the north.

== See also ==
- Land reclamation in Bahrain
- Isa Town
- Hamad Town
- List of islands of Bahrain
