= Al Wusta Region =

Al Wusta Region may refer to:

- Al Wusta Region (Oman)
- Al Wusta Region (Bahrain)

== See also ==
- Al Wusta (disambiguation)
