= Ash Shamaliyah =

Ash Shamaliyah (from Arabic الشمالية, 'northern') or Shamal ('north'), or variants, may refer to:

== Places ==
- Northern state, Sudan, or Ash Shamaliyah
- Northern Governorate, Bahrain, or Ash Shamaliyah
  - Northern Region, Bahrain
- North Governorate, Lebanon, or Ash Shamal
- Al Shamal, a municipality in Qatar
  - Madinat ash Shamal
- Shamal District, Afghanistan
  - Shamal, Khost Province

== Arts and entertainment ==
- Shamal (album), by Gong, 1976
- Shamal, a music project by Enzo Rao
- Shamall, a music band
- Shamal, a character in Magical Girl Lyrical Nanoha

== People ==
- Marina Shamal (born 1939), a Russian swimmer
- Steve Shamal (born 1996), a French footballer
- Shamal Bhatt, an 18th-century Gujarati narrative poet
- Shamal George (born 1998), an English footballer

== Other uses ==
- Shamal (wind), a wind in the Middle East
- Maserati Shamal, a car
- USS Shamal, a ship
- Al Shamal Islamic Bank, Sudan
- Al-Shamal SC, a Qatari sports club
- Al-Shamali AC, a Sudanese football club

== See also ==
- Al-Janubiyah (disambiguation) (southern)
- Al Gharbiyah (disambiguation) (western)
- Ash Sharqiyah (disambiguation) (eastern)
- Al Wusta (disambiguation) (central)
- Northern (disambiguation)
- Northern Borders Region, Saudi Arabia
- North Darfur, Sudan
