= Ministry of Housing (Bahrain) =

Government ministry of Bahrain

Ministry overview
- Formed: 1975 (51 years ago)
- Preceding Ministry: The Ministry of Works & Housing (MWH)
- Type: Government Ministry
- Jurisdiction: Cabinet of Bahrain
- Headquarters: Diplomatic Area, Manama; 26.241183°N 50.589093°E
- Minister responsible: Basim bin Yacob Alhamer
- Deputy Minister responsible: Abdullah bin Ahmed Al Khalifa (Undersecretary)
- Website: housing.gov.bh

Footnotes
- Construction - Project Management

The Ministry of Housing (MOH) is responsible for providing adequate housing for families with limited income in Bahrain.

== History and profile ==
The ministry was established in 1975 with Khalid bin Abdulla Al Khalifa as the first Housing Minister. He served in the post between 1975 and 1995.

The cabinet added the Housing sector to the Ministry of Works functions after the 2002 Bahraini general election. It was then called "The Ministry of Works & Housing". In December 2007, the ministry was again divided into two separate ministries, one for Housing and one for Public Works.

== Ministry's projects ==
The ministry has allegedly constructed 91,864 housing services to this day. The most notable projects were the construction of:

- Isa Town
- Hamad Town
- East Hidd City
- East Sitra City
- Northern City (now renamed Salman Town)
- Zayed Town

In 2013 the Ministry of Housing announced the first ever housing public private partnership (PPP). Partnering with Ithmaar Bank the Ministry has plans to build 50,000 social housing units. The project has begun with 2,800 units in Al Medina Al Shamaliya and Al Luwzi.

== Criticism ==
In May 2013, Prince Charles’s Foundation for Building Community had signed an agreement with the Bahraini Minister of Housing, Basim Alhamer. The purpose was to advise on a sustainable-housing development inspired by Charles’s Poundbury village in Dorset. The £700,000 deal was sharply criticised by campaigners who said it deflected attention from human-rights abuses during the 2011 bloody protests for reform in Bahrain.
