= Central Governorate =

Central Governorate may refer to:

- Central Governorate, Bahrain
- Al Wusta Governorate (Oman)

== See also ==
- Al Wusta (disambiguation)
