= Governorates of Bahrain =

Governorates of Bahrain محافظات البحرين (Arabic)
- Category: Unitary state
- Location: Kingdom of Bahrain
- Number: 4 Governorates
- Populations: 268,106 (Muharraq Governorate) – 534,939 (Capital Governorate)
- Areas: 78.71 km^{2} (30.39 sq mi) (Capital Governorate) – 488.85 km^{2} (188.75 sq mi) (Southern Governorate)
- Government: governate government, National government
- Subdivisions: Municipalities (Madinat)

The Kingdom of Bahrain is divided into four governorates: the Capital, Northern, Southern and Muharraq. The Central Governorate was abolished in September 2014.

Each governorate is governed by a governor, appointed by the prime minister, and has its own municipality council, with separate elections for them. The first municipal elections in Bahrain held after independence in 1971, was held in conjunction with the 2002 Bahraini general election. The most recent was held in conjunction with the 2022 Bahraini general election.

== Governorates ==
The governorates are the Northern Governorate, Southern Governorate, Muharraq Governorate, and Capital Governorate:

Map	Governorates
	1 – Capital Governorate
2 – Muharraq Governorate
3 – Northern Governorate
4 – Southern Governorate

== Constituencies ==
Constituencies of the capital governorate in 2012.

Each governorate is divided into a varying number of constituencies for the election of the country's Council of Representatives. Elections are held in these constituencies every four years, with each constituency electing one member. Only Bahraini citizens are entitled to stand for and to vote at elections.

== History ==
=== Municipalities ===
The first municipality in Bahrain was the eight-member Manama municipality which was established in July 1919. Members of the municipality were elected annually; the municipality was said to have been the first municipality to be established in the Arab world. The municipality was in charge of cleaning roads and renting buildings to tenants and shops. By 1929, it undertook road expansions as well as opening markets and slaughterhouses. In 1958, the municipality started water purification projects. In 1960, Bahrain comprised four municipalities: Manama, Hidd, Al Muharraq, and Riffa. Over the next 30 years, the 4 municipalities were divided into 12 municipalities as settlements such as Hamad Town and Isa Town grew. These municipalities were administered from Manama under a central municipal council whose members are appointed by the king.

The first municipal elections to be held in Bahrain after independence in 1971, was in 2002. The municipalities were:

Map	Former Municipality
	1. Al Hidd
2. Manama
3. Western Region
4. Central Region
5. Northern Region
6. Muharraq
7. Rifa and Southern Region
8. Jidd Haffs
9. Hamad Town (not shown)
10. Isa Town
11. Hawar Islands
12. Sitra

=== Governates ===
After 3 July 2002, Bahrain was split into five administrative governorates, each of which has its own governor. These governorates were abolished in September 2014. These governorates were:

Map	Former Governorates
	1. Capital Governorate
2. Central Governorate
3. Muharraq Governorate
4. Northern Governorate
5. Southern Governorate

== See also ==
- Geography of Bahrain
- ISO 3166-2:BH
