= East Sitra City =

Public housing development in Bahrain

East Sitra City (Arabic: مدينة شرق سترة)
- Interactive map of East Sitra City (Arabic: مدينة شرق سترة)

General information
- Location: Sitra, Bahrain
- Coordinates: 26.12°N 50.65°E
- Area: 540 hectares (1,300 acres)

Construction
- Architect: WS Atkins

East Sitra City (Arabic: مدينة شرق سترة) is a proposed public housing mega-project under construction in the Kingdom of Bahrain. Proposed in 2014 by the Bahraini Ministry of Housing, the project involves land reclamation of 253 to 540 hectares (5.8 million square metres) off the eastern coast of Sitra island. Once completed, the reclaimed islands are estimated to consist of 3,157 housing units, serving more than 20,000 citizens.

The project is part of a concurrent series of 245 million BHD ($649 million) public housing projects launched in the country in the 2010s, such as the Northern City and East Hidd City.

== Construction ==
The project plans for six separate man-made islands to be reclaimed from the sea, off the east coast of Sitra. It is estimated that up to 600 hectares of land would be reclaimed. AECOM are the chief planners of the project. Nature Environmental Studies and Consultations served as environmental consultants, WS Atkins & Partners Overseas are the architects, and Masterplan and Infrastructure served as design consultant. The city will include a 2.6km seafront and 13km of bicycle lanes. 255 hectares were donated by the King Hamad bin Isa Al Khalifa. The reclamation work was assigned to the National Marine Dredging Company (NMDC).

An estimated 25 million cubic metres of dredged sand were required to reclaim land. In addition to serving as a housing project, the city will host facilities for Bahrain's oil sector and other government use.

In June 2014, the Ministry of Housing of Bahrain signed the agreement to draw the detailed blueprint of the project. In June 2015, Crown Prince Salman bin Hamad Al Khalifa laid the first stone of the project. The construction has been awarded to the Chinese company China Machinery Engineering Corporation in December 2019. The construction project has three phases. Phase 1 (construction of 1,077 units) started in December 2020. Phase 2 will see the construction of 1,800 units, and phase 3 of a further 500 units.

== See also ==
- East Hidd City, a concurrent housing project under construction on reclaimed land.
