= Al Wusta Governorate =

Al Wusta Governorate may refer to:

- Central Governorate (Bahrain)
- Al Wusta Governorate (Oman) (former region)
