= Ash Sharqiyah =

Al Sharqiyah, Ash Sharqiyah (Arabic: الشرقية, from Arabic شرقية) or its variants, meaning 'eastern' or loosely 'oriental', may refer to:

== Places ==
- Ash Sharqiyah Region (Oman)
  - Ash Sharqiyah North Governorate
  - Ash Sharqiyah South Governorate
- Ash Sharqiyah Province, Saudi Arabia
- Ash Sharqiyah, Abyan, Yemen
- Ash Sharqiyah, Hadhramaut, Yemen
- Ash Sharqiya Fort, in the harbor of Old Muscat, Oman
- Sharqia Governorate, Egypt
  - El Sharkia SC, a sports club
- Al Ain Region in the Emirate of Abu Dhabi, formerly Ash-Sharqiyyah Region
- Kassala (state), Sudan, called Ash Sharqiyah 1991–1994)
- Sharqiya Sands, Oman

== See also ==
- Al Gharbiyah (disambiguation) (western)
- Ash Shamaliyah (disambiguation) (northern)
- Al-Janubiyah (disambiguation) (southern)
- Al Wusta (disambiguation) (central)
- Eastern (disambiguation)
- Sharq (disambiguation)
- Axarquía, a comarca of Andalusia, Spain
- Mashriq (disambiguation), the historical region of the Arab world to the east of Egypt
- Sharqliyya, Syria
