= Al-Janubiyah =

Al-Janubiyah or Al Janobiyah (from Arabic الجنوبية, 'southern') and Al Janub ('south'), or variants may refer to:

== Places ==
- Southern Governorate, Bahrain, or Al Janubiyah
- South Governorate, Lebanon (Al Janūb Governorate)
- Southern Provinces (Al-Aqalim al-Janubiyah) or "Moroccan Sahara", term used by Morocco for Western Sahara

== People ==
- Wail al-Shehri (1973–2001) a.k.a. Abu Mossaeb al-Janubi, September 11, 2001 airplane hijacker
- Marwan ibn Abi al-Janub, 9th century Abbasid poet

== Other uses ==
- Jānubi, Jānubi Yamani, Jānubi Soudani, etc. – rhythmic units in Arabic music

== See also ==
- Al Gharbiyah (disambiguation) (western)
- Ash Shamaliyah (disambiguation) (northern)
- Ash Sharqiyah (disambiguation) (eastern)
- Al Wusta (disambiguation) (central)
- Southern (disambiguation)
- Dhofar Governorate in Southern Oman
