= Mashriq (disambiguation) =

Mashriq is the cultural and geographical region in the eastern part of the Arab world.

Mashriq or Mashreq or Mashrek (Arabic: مشرق) and francicized Machrek or Machriq, may also refer to:

== Mashriq ==
- Al-Machriq (The East), a journal founded in 1898, published by Saint Joseph University in Beirut, Lebanon
- Al-Mashriq, Iraqi daily newspaper
- Daily Mashriq (Urdu: روزنامہ مشرق), daily newspaper in Pakistan
- Mashriq TV, British-Pakistani television channel
- Mashriqu'l-Adhkar, Bahá'í House of Worship ("Dawning-place of the remembrances of God")
- Mashriq wahy (Arabic: مشرق وحيه, 1817–1892), name for Bahá'u'lláh

== Mashreq ==
- Arab Mashreq International Road Network
- Mashreq (bank), the oldest privately owned bank in the United Arab Emirates founded as the Bank of Oman in 1967
- Mashreq University, a private university located in Khartoum North in Sudan

== Mashrek ==
- Bank Al Mashrek, defunct bank in Lebanon under CEO Roger Tamraz

== See also ==
- Levant (disambiguation), an approximate historical geographical term referring to a large area in the Eastern Mediterranean region of Western Asia
- Middle East (disambiguation), in its narrower sense includes the Mashriq countries
- Maghreb (disambiguation), the Arab World west of Egypt, that includes Algeria, Libya, Mauritania, Morocco and Tunisia
- Arabic in the Mashriq or Eastern Arabic, or Mashriqi ʿAmmiya, encompasses the varieties of Arabic spoken in the Mashriq
- Mashriqi numerals, another term for Eastern Arabic numerals
- Mashriqiyyun, the "Easterners", alternative name for Mizrahi Jews
- Ash Sharqiyah (disambiguation)
