= Al Wusta =

Al Wusta (from Arabic الوسطى, 'central') may refer to:

- Central Governorate, Bahrain
  - Central Region, Bahrain
- Al Wusta Governorate (Oman)
- Wusta, a former district in Libya prior to 1995

== See also ==
- Al-Janubiyah (disambiguation) (southern)
- Al Gharbiyah (disambiguation) (western)
- Ash Shamaliyah (disambiguation) (northern)
- Ash Sharqiyah (disambiguation) (eastern)
- Markazi (disambiguation) (central)
