= Maghrib =

Maghrib or Maghreb primarily refer to:

- Maghrib (prayer), the fourth daily salat in Islam, offered just after sunset
- The Maghrib or Maghreb, a region of North Africa west of Egypt

Maghrib, Magrib, or Maghreb may also refer to:

- Morocco, whose Arabic name is al-Maghrib, "the Maghrib"
- Maghrebi script, a form of Arabic calligraphy
- Magrib (film), a 1993 Indian Malayalam film
- Maghreb, Iran, a village in Fars Province, Iran

== See also ==
- Al Gharbiyah (disambiguation)
- Arab Maghreb Union
- Maghrebis, inhabitants of the Greater Maghreb
- Moroccans, inhabitants of Morocco
- Maghrebi mint tea
- Barbary Coast
- Tamazgha
- West
