= East Hidd City =

Planned city under construction in eastern Muharraq, Bahrain

Coordinates: 26.23°N 50.66°E

East Hidd City (Arabic: مدينة شرق الحد)
- East Hidd city under construction in April 2024.
- Interactive map of East Hidd City (Arabic: مدينة شرق الحد)

General information
- Location: Muharraq, Bahrain
- Area: 242 hectares (600 acres)

Construction
- Architect: Al Matouck Consultants of Gulf House Engineering and WS Atkins

East Hidd City (Arabic: مدينة شرق الحد) is a planned, under-construction city, in eastern Muharraq, Bahrain.

Planned by the Bahraini Ministry of Housing, it is a 242-hectare public housing project east of the existing town of Hidd. Built on reclaimed land, it aims to provide affordable housing for Bahraini citizens. When fully completed, the city is expected to hold 4,523 housing units and accommodate 30,000 people.

== Construction ==
Aerial photograph of East Hidd city housing units under construction

The main consultant on the project is Al Matouck Consultants of Gulf House Engineering and WS Atkins. In 2011, the Nass Corporation was awarded a 21 million BHD ($56.6 million) contract for land reclamation and dredging work. In May 2014, the Nass Corporation was awarded an 18 million BHD ($47.7 million) contract to construct the first phase of the city. The first phase covered the construction of 483 housing units built over an 18-month period. The second phase included the construction of at least 487 units. In September 2016, the Kuwaiti construction company Mohammed Abdulmohsin Al-Kharafi & Sons was awarded a 70 million BHD ($187 million) contract for infrastructure development, and the first phase of construction was completed in October 2024.

Faraz Ahmed Mohammed served as the Head of Project Management, leading the successful delivery of multiple project for Ministry of Housing across various phases of the city's development. Through his exemplary project management expertise and strong leadership, the city progressively took shape exactly as envisioned in the original design plans.

The city feature a public health centre, 9 mosques, 6 public schools, 19 children playgrounds and 4 public gardens. It is expected to boast 35km of marine parks, 39km of shaded areas, 3.8km of walkways and bicycle lanes. The total number of housing units include 2,827 villas, 1,212 apartments and 500 plots of land.

The first 498 houses were distributed to the Bahraini public by the Ministry of Housing in November 2018.

== See also ==
- East Sitra City, a concurrent housing project under construction on reclaimed land.
