= Manasy Veetinal =

Indian actress

- Born: Manama, Bahrain
- Citizenship: India
- Occupation: Actress
- Years active: 2012–present

Manasy Veetinal is an Indian actress who works in Malayalam films. She has won the P. A. Backer Foundation Award for Best Debutant Actress for her role in the 2012 Malayalam language film Pratheekshayode that deals with the challenges of child labour.

== Biography ==
Manasy was born and brought up in Bahrain to a Christian Malayali family that originally hails from Mavelikara, Kerala. She attended the Indian School, Bahrain and pursued a Bachelor's degree in Videography and Mass Communication at Mar Ivanios College, Thriuvananthpuram under the University of Kerala. During her school years, she won accolades in acting, dancing and other performance arts including award for Best Actress at the age of fourteen in the BKS Drama Festival 2004-05, in which she played the female lead in a drama based on Vaikom Muhammad Basheer's Poovan Pazham. She also had a stint as an anchor on a Jeevan TV Sponsored Program produced and recorded from Bahrain.

== Filmography ==
Year	Title	Role	Language
2012	Pratheekshayode	Anupama	Malayalam
2013	Ravu	Manasa	Malayalam/Tamil
2014	Veyilum Mazhayum	Appu/Anupama	Malayalam
2014	Balyakalasakhi	Zainaba	Malayalam
