= Al Gharbiyah =

Al Gharbiyah (Arabic: ٱلْـغَـرْبِـيَّـة 'western'), or Gharb (غَـرْب 'west'), or variants may refer to:

- Al Gharbia, Abu Dhabi
- Western Region, Bahrain
- Għarb, Gozo, Malta
- Gharbia Governorate, Egypt
- Gharb Al-Andalus or Al-Gharb, former name of a region of modern-day Portugal and Spain 711–1249
  - Algarve, name of a modern-day region of Portugal
- Gharb-Chrarda-Béni Hssen, or Gharb, a former region of Morocco
  - Gharb Basin
  - Gharb (Morocco) also written as Rharb, a historical and geographical region in Morocco
- Gharbia, Algeria

== See also ==
- Gharbi (disambiguation)
- Maghrib (disambiguation)
- Al-Janubiyah (disambiguation) (southern)
- Ash Shamaliyah (disambiguation) (northern)
- Ash Sharqiyah (disambiguation) (eastern)
- Al Wusta (disambiguation) (central)
- Western (disambiguation)
- Abu Ghraib, Iraq
- Algarve, Portugal
- Cape Trafalgar, Spain
