= Mintaqa =

Administrative division in Saudi Arabia, Chad and several other Arab countries

A mintaqa (Arabic: مِنْطَقَة, romanized: minṭaqa [ˈmintˤaqa]; plural مَنَاطِق manāṭiq [maˈnaːtˤiq]) is a first-level administrative division in Saudi Arabia and Chad and for a second-level administrative division in several other Arab countries. It is often translated as region or district, but the literal meaning is "region", "area", or even simply "place".

== Usage ==
First-level administrative divisions

- Provinces of Chad (top-level)
- Provinces of Saudi Arabia (top-level, above governorates)

Second-level administrative divisions

- Areas of Kuwait (second-level, below governorates)
- Regions of Bahrain (formerly, top-level, replaced by governorates)
- Regions of Oman (formerly, top-level, alongside governorates, now only governorates)
- Districts of Syria (second-level, below governorates); a minṭaqa in Syria was formerly called qaḍāʾ.
- Districts of Israel (top-level)
- Zones of Qatar (second-level, below municipalities)
