= Shamall =

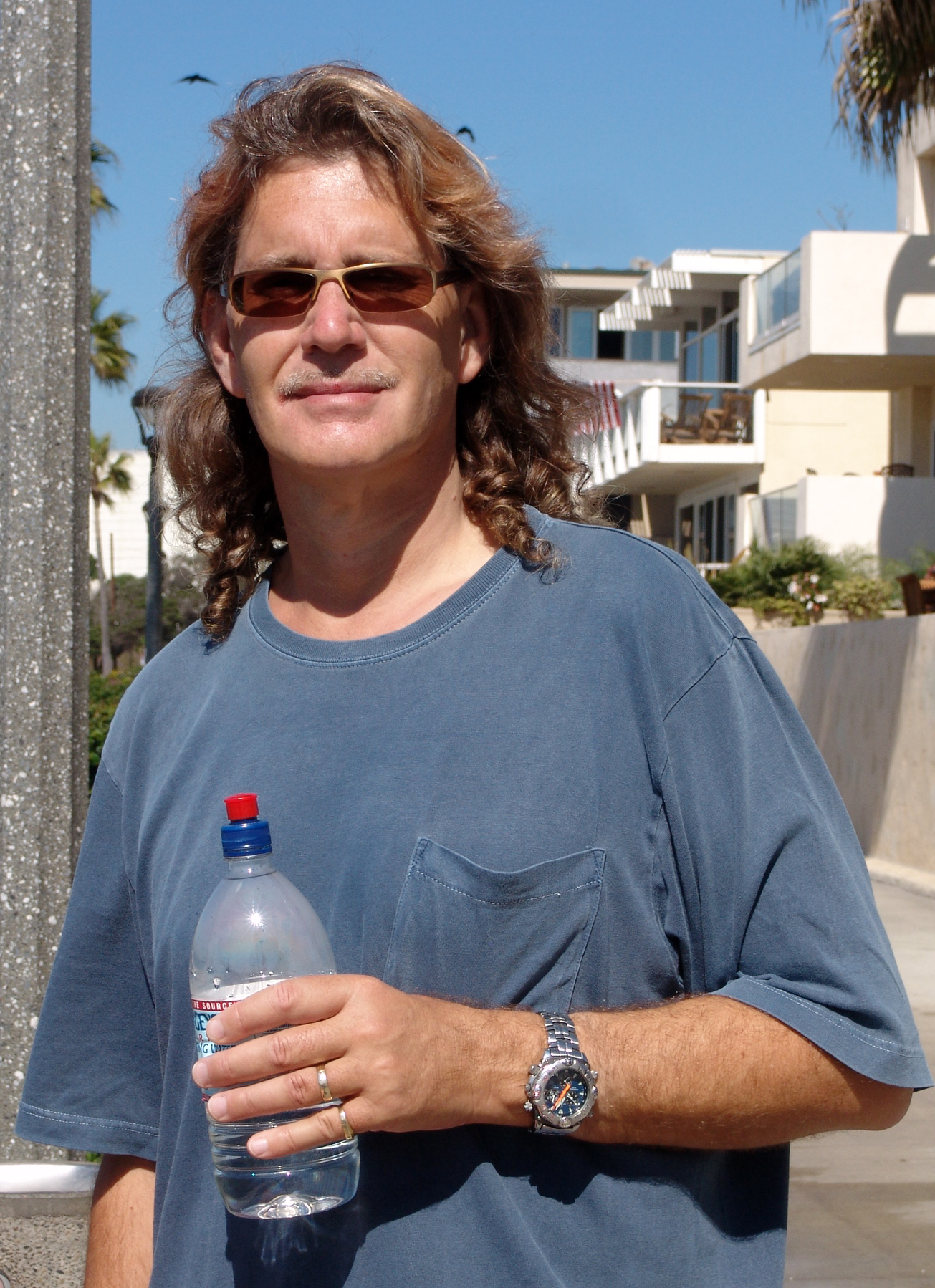
- Norbert Krueler

Background information
- Origin: Germany
- Genres: Progressive rock, psychedelic rock, electronic rock, krautrock
- Years active: 1986–present
- Label: 2L Productions
- Members: Norbert Krueler (vocals, keyboards, guitars, bass); Support: Matthias Mehrtens (guitars); Mike Bach (drums)
- Website: www.shamall.com

Shamall (Shamal, which loosely translates as "hot desert wind") features music which is a fusion of progressive rock, electronic, rock, pop, and classical. The project was founded by the German musician and producer Norbert Krueler in 1986.

== History ==
At the beginning of the seventies, Norbert Krueler used simple radio tubes, a microphone and a regular acoustic guitar to create new sound effects. A local concert promoter became aware of the young artist and enabled him to support many acts of popular German Krautrock bands like Grobschnitt, King Pin Meh, Birth Control and Kraan. As music clubs boomed, Norbert swapped the live stage for a DJ stand for financial reasons.

At the end of 1984, Norbert started to make his own music again. He availed himself of the technical progress and added rhythmic experimental music compositions to a laser show for his club audience. These compositions were available only for his club audience and never released to the public.

Finally, a record company became aware of Norbert's work. But his long, experimental tracks were not suited for airplay, so Norbert had to add vocals and shorten his tracks for commercial reasons. With the help of the musicians Michael Jaspers and Detlef Reder, Norbert released, under the pseudonym Shamall, the debut single My Dream in 1986. The music style was Italo disco, and My Dream reached number 9 on the German DJ Top 40 charts. Shortly after, Michael Jaspers left the project. Norbert Krueler and Detlef Reder produced the second single Feeling Like a Stranger in 1987 with similar success. Two years later, Detlef Reder left Shamall.

Since then, Shamall is a "virtual band project" with different musicians.

== Musical style ==
The singles my dream and feeling like a stranger are categorized as Italo disco. After that Shamall's musical style changed. The album Journey to a Nightmare (1989) is the first of many releases in the style of electronic music. Moments of Illusion is the second and Shamall's most successful album to date. It contains the track physical visions which was used by T-Online and Time Life for advertising purposes. The following longplayer Mirror to Eternity (1993), In Search of Precision (1994) and This Island Earth (1997) were reviewed by Matt Howarth at Space.com as "music with fascinating sound and emotional depth".

At the end of 1998 the double-cd Influences was released. A German prog-magazine (DURP) describes Shamall as "ambient progrock".

Altogether, nearly over a whole decade psychedelic sounds, elements of symphonic rock and electronic music mould Shamall's style of music in this era (1989–1999).

The following release The Book of Genesis from June 2001 commenced another change of Shamall's music style. The main theme New Age Krautrock Symphony was awarded by the audience of German radioshow "Schwingungen" as "best song of 2001". Formerly categorized as electronic music, Shamall's music becomes now more native. Vocals and guitars play a major role in recent releases, starting with the album who do they think they are, a concept album about the gulf war. Both follower Ambiguous points of view (2006) and Questions of Life (2008) were classified as psychedelic Krautrock and progressive rock.

The German rock magazine eclipsed described Shamall's music as being between Pink Floyd and Alan Parsons.

== Band members ==
Shamall works together with numerous different musicians all over the years. Frequent members on several releases are Matthias Mehrtens (guitar) and Mike Bach (drums).

== Lyrics ==
The lyrics often are about the meaning of life as well as political and ecological issues.

== Discography ==
=== Longplayer ===
- 1989: Journey to a Nightmare
- 1990: Moments of Illusion
- 1993: Mirror to Eternity
- 1994: In Search of Precision
- 1997: This Island Earth
- 1998: Influences 2 CD
- 2001: The Book Genesis 2 CD
- 2003: Who do they think they are 2 CD
- 2006: Ambiguous points of view 2 CD
- 2008: Questions of Life
- 2009: Is this human behavior 2 CD
- 2013: Turn Off 2 CD
- 2016: Continuation
- 2019: Schizophrenia

=== Demos and Compilations ===
- 1993: Collectors Items (1986–1993) 2 CD
- 1994: Dance Rock Classics
- 2001: Schwingungen Compilation Nr. 07/2001
- 2003: Schwingungen Jubilee edition Nr. 100
- 2007: Schwingungen Compilation Nr. 02/2007
- 2007: Timeless journey I
- 2007: Timeless journey II
- 2007: Timeless journey III
- 2007: Timeless journey IV
- 2008: Art of Sysyphus Nr. 47
- 2010: Music From Time And Space Vol.36
- 2010: Feeling like a stranger - the whole trip (1988 - 1998)
- 2014: Music From Time And Space Vol.50
- 2016: History Book (5 CD Box - 30 Years Anniversary Edition)
- 2016: Music From Time and Space Vol. 62

=== Singles and EPs ===
- 1986: My dream
- 1987: Feeling like a stranger
