= Ash Sharqiyah, Hadhramaut =

Ash Sharqiyah
- Country: Yemen
- Governorate: Hadhramaut
- Time zone: UTC+3 (Yemen Standard Time)

Ash Sharqiyah is a village in eastern Yemen. It is located in the Hadhramaut Governorate.
