= Mogharrab-e Do =

Mogharrab-e Do مغرب 2
- Village
- Location within Iran
- Coordinates: 29°42′12″N 53°00′55″E
- Country: Iran
- Province: Fars
- County: Shiraz
- Bakhsh: Zarqan
- Rural District: Rahmatabad

Population (2006)
  - Total: 122
- Time zone: UTC+3:30 (IRST)
  - Summer (DST): UTC+4:30 (IRDT)

Mogharrab-e Do (Persian: مغرب 2; also known as Maghreb, Mogharrab, Moqarreb, Moqarreb-e, and Qaryeh-ye Moqarreb) is a village in Rahmatabad Rural District, Zarqan District, Shiraz County, Fars province, Iran. At the 2006 census, its population was 122, in 31 families.
