= Indian School, Bahrain =

CBSE–affiliated Indian Community school based in Bahrain

The Indian School
- المدرسة الهندية

Location
- Senior Campus - Isa Town & Junior Campus - RIffa; Bahrain
- Coordinates: 26°9′30.21″N 50°32′29.37″E

Information
- School type: Private Community School
- Motto: तमसो मा ज्योतिर्गमय (tamaso mā jyothirgamaya) (Lead me from darkness to light)
- Established: 1950
- Founder: Vasanthi Rao and 2 others
- Status: Open
- Chairman: Mr. Binu Mannil Varughese
- Principal: Mr. Palaniswamy
- Staff: 600+
- Faculty: 300+
- Enrollment: 18000+
- Colors: Navy blue & White
- Website: www.indianschool.bh

The Indian School (Arabic: المدرسة الهندية) is a CBSE–affiliated community school in Bahrain. Founded by three Indian women as an elementary school for the children of Indian nationals in Bahrain, it is currently one of the largest co-ed schools in the Persian Gulf region. It was founded in 1950.

== History ==
Bahrain's much-acclaimed Indian School owes its origins to the far-sightedness of the Bhatia community. When families started coming to the Gulf in the 'fifties', formal education was non-existent and housewives used to run an informal "gurukula" system of in-house study. Older children were sent off to India for higher education. It was obvious that the "gurukula" system was of limited use and when a young Indian boy playing in the streets was involved in a road accident, queries were raised by the British Advisor Sir Charles Belgrave about schooling for Indian children.

Seizing this opportunity, Lalchand D.I. sought permission for such an establishment, and to the delight of the Indian community, permission was granted almost immediately. To make the vision a reality, two prominent and industrious Indian businessmen were elected – Balubhai B. Desai who was with BAPCO and Karunakaran of Kanoo, brother of Narayanan, Sir Charles Belgrave's secretary. Assistance was provided by the Divine Life Society, a religious body, and several individuals such as Shivlal Hemraj, B. Ratilal, Chaturbhujdas Mulchand, Purushottam Naraini (Narain Maharaj, who had already helped establish the first Arabic school in Muharraq) and the prominent Paris social worker Jamshed Marolia.

The school was inaugurated on Dussehra day in 1950 (just 3 years after India got its Independence from the British) and started with three lady teachers and 30-35 students. The first teachers included Shantaben Gopaldas Kikla, Nirmalaben and Geeta Tikamdas Gajria. Despite modest salary scales (Rs. 150/- for the Principal and Rs. 75/- for the teachers), the fledgling school needed support and this was given by businessmen such as Shri Lala Gajria and Shri Mathardas Rupchand Bhatia. This help continued and the present Senior School in Isa Town owes a lot to the pioneering vision of Lala Gajria and Atma Jashnmal among others who undertook to obtain land and raise funds for the school.

Founded in 1950, its creation was initiated by the efforts of the Indian community in the Kingdom of Bahrain. The school's board is largely composed of parents elected for three-year terms. It is one of the oldest Indian schools in Bahrain.

The school commenced its journey with a headmistress and three staff members. Today, The Indian School is one of the largest expatriate schools in the Persian Gulf with over 13,000 students and a workforce of over 2077 members.

The school is spread over two expansive campuses located at Riffa (LKG/JKG to 3rd) and at Isa Town (4th to 12th). The school has around 13,000 students and is one of the largest co-ed schools in the Persian Gulf region.

During the years 2008-2014 which was considered as the golden period for ISB, the school stretched both ways, almost doubling the student and staff strength and building a new campus in Riffa for lower classes and expansion of the existing campus at Isa Town. Before the Riffa campus, lower classes were at the Sitra campus in a rented building. Traffic issues at Sitra forced the school to shift to a much safer location for the students.

== Notable alumni ==
- Mamta Mohandas – actress, film producer and playback singer
- Vishnupriya – actress, dancer and model
- Manasy Veetinal – actress
- Mathew Thomas - actor

== See also ==
- List of schools in Bahrain
