= Isa Town =

City in Bahrain

Isa Town مدينة عيسى
- Town
- Isa Town Gate, marking the entrance to Isa Town

- Location in Bahrain
- Country: Bahrain
- Governorate: Capital Governorate
- Constructed: 1963
- Time zone: UTC + 3

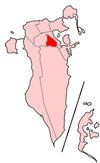
Map of Bahrain showing Madinat 'Isa municipality

Isa Town (Arabic: مدينة عيسى, Madīnat ʿĪsā) is a planned town located in north-central Bahrain, 8 kilometres southwest of the capital Manama. Designed to serve low to middle income households as a social housing project, it is the country's second planned settlement after the oil town of Awali.

== Etymology ==
The name Isa refers to Isa ibn Salman Al Khalifah, the emir of Bahrain from 1961 to 1999, in whose reign the town was constructed and named after.

== Administration ==
It was one of the twelve municipalities of Bahrain after being split off of the municipality of al Mintaqah al Wusta in 1988, then became part of the Central Governorate till September 2014 when it became part of Capital Governorate.

== History ==
The foundation stone for Isa Town was laid in December 1963 with construction commencing in 1964 and continuing onto 1968. Isa Town's first residents began living there from December 1967 onwards. The town underwent subsequent expansions after 1975.

Isa Town largely comprises affluent villas, and is home to many members of Bahrain's educated middle class. In the 2002 election, it was one of the few areas of Bahrain not to be entirely represented by an Islamist or right-wing MP, with Abdnabi Salman of the formerly communist Democratic Bloc winning the seat. In 2006's election, ex-Harvard academic Dr Munira Fakhro of Wa'ad lost in controversial circumstances to Sunni Islamist Dr Salah Ali of Al-Menbar Islamic Society.

=== Isa Town Market inferno ===
On 15 July 2012, the Isa Town marketplace caught fire, damaging more than 450 shops and causing damages amounting to hundreds of thousands of dinars. It took dozens of firefighters and around 30 fire engines more than five hours to control the blaze. There were no reported casualties although two firemen were hospitalized due to smoke inhalation. It was estimated that two-thirds of the market was destroyed.

Bahrain's Prime Minister at the time, Khalifa bin Salman al-Khalifa, ordered a probe to be set up to investigate the incident.

== Economy ==
Isa Town is famous for its traditional marketplace. The National Driving School and the Directorate of Road Traffic have their headquarters in Isa Town. Other offices include the Ministry of Education and the Ministry of Information, which includes the Bahrain Radio & TV broadcasting station, in Isa Town. Besides the market, the main landmark is the Bahrain National Stadium. The Bahrain Polytechnic campus is situated on the old site of Bahrain University's campus.

== Education ==
Isa Town is the location of multiple private schools in Bahrain, with the Indian School, The New Indian School, Pakistan Urdu School, Sacred Heart School, Ibn Khuldoon National School, Pakistan School, The Bahrain Bayan School, the Naseem International School and the St. Christopher's School, all concentrated in a small zone which also includes the Isa Town campus of the University of Bahrain.

=== Pakistan School, Bahrain ===
Pakistan School, Bahrain
- پاکستان اسکول بحرین

Location
- Road 4109 Isa Town; Central Governorate, Bahrain; 26.1590°N 50.5439°E

Information
- Established: 1968
- Principal: Attique-Ur_Rehman
- Grades: Kindergarten to Class XII (HSSC)
- Gender: Boys school
- Language: Urdu, English
- Website: pakistanschool.org

Pakistan School, Bahrain (PSB; Urdu: پاکستان اسکول بحرین) is a Pakistan International School located in Isa Town, Bahrain. The school was founded in July 1968 by a group of overseas Pakistanis. Originally the school was housed at a rented building in Manama with 100 students. With a gradual increase in enrollment, the need to construct a school building was deemed necessary, to provide all modern educational facilities. At the request of the managing committee of the school, the Kingdom of Bahrain leased land in Isa Town for the construction of the school. The Minister of Education Ali M. Fakhro, laid the foundation stone of the school on 10 January 1983 while H.E Salman, Crown Prince of Bahrain performed the inauguration of the building on 23 March 1985. The building was again expanded and on 25 September 1993, Jinnah Block was inaugurated. On 5 June 1995, Dr. Abdul Qadeer Khan inaugurated Sir Syed Block.

== Healthcare ==
Isa Town health centre is the town's primary public healthcare facility offering primary care services to residents.

== Notable residents ==
Saudi singer, Rashed Al-Majed, the Bahraini guitarist Khalid Al-Thawadi and the Brothers Band (Arabic: فرقة الأخوة) drummer, Wajeeh Hassan live in Madinat Isa.
