= Ethnic, cultural and religious groups of Bahrain =

Ethnic groups in Bahrain (2010)
Ethnic groups
Bahraini	46%
Asian	45.5%
other Arabs	4.7%
African	1.6%
European	1%
Other (Americans and GCC nationals)	1.2%

Bahrain is a nation in the Persian Gulf, in a strategical position in relation to the eastern coast of the Arabian Peninsula, Iran, Iraq and Oman.

== Shias ==
=== Baharna ===
Baharna mostly live in Manama, majority of the villages on the main island of Bahrain, several villages on the island of Muharraq, and in the island of Sitra to the east. They speak similar dialects, with slight variations between villages, with exception to the villages of Sitra which have dialects which differ considerably from those of the main island.

Palm tree farming and fishing were the traditional economic activities of the Baharna.

There are also Shia Arabs concentrated in several neighborhoods in Muharraq city. They originally came from Al-Hasa, they are considered to be "Hasawis". They are distinct from the Baharna from villages outside the city proper. As a result of their proximity to surrounding Sunni Arabs, they speak the Bahraini Sunni dialect.

=== Persians ===
The Shia Persians of Bahrain are a significant and influential ethnic minority whose ancestors arrived in Bahrain during the old persians states/empires days and in the early 19th century as laborers, artisans and merchants. There are large communities in Muharraq and Manama. Persians maintain a distinct culture and language, but have long since assimilated into Bahraini culture; they tend to identify themselves more as Persian Bahrainis or Bahrainis than Iranians. Almost all are bilingual in Arabic and Persian, with school, work and daily affairs conducted in Arabic and Persian usually relegated to the family domain. Almost all have possessed Bahraini citizenship since birth; in most cases their parents, and in some cases their grandparents, are also holders of Bahraini citizenship.

== Sunnis ==
Sunni population has been historically compartmentalized into the three groups listed below, with the Sunni Arabs forming the majority of the Bahraini population. Sunni Bahrainis are mostly concentrated in areas such as Busaiteen, Budaiya, Jasra, Zallaq, Askar, Jaw, al-Dur, amongst others.

=== Arabs ===
Sunni Arabs in Bahrain are Arabs who immigrated to Bahrain from Al-Ahsa, Najd and Qatar for pearl diving and trade, in the twelfth half during the Khalifi conquest of the country. Sunni Arabs are the most influential ethnic group in Bahrain, they hold most government positions and the Bahraini monarchy are Sunni Arabs. Sunni Arabs have traditionally lived in areas such as Zallaq, Muharraq, Riffa and Hawar islands.

=== Afro-Arabs ===
Most Arabs of African descent originate from East Africa like Egyptians and have traditionally lived in Muharraq Island and Riffa.

Some Afro-Arabs are also Shia.

=== Huwala ===
The Huwala are the descendants of Sunni coastal Arabs of Iran who migrated to the Arab states of the Persian Gulf during the 19th century.

=== Sunni Persians ===
They are not to be confused with the Sunni Persians known as Achomi/Khodmooni people, who are mostly Sunni Persians of Persian non-Arab ancestry who migrated to GCC countries through the 19th and 20th centuries. Many of them originally lived in Manamah, Awadhiya (a neighborhood in Godaibiya named after Evaz) and Hoora; both of which are now nearly exclusively only populated by foreigners of South and East Asian origins, however they later resettled in Muharraq Island and Riffa.

== South Asians ==
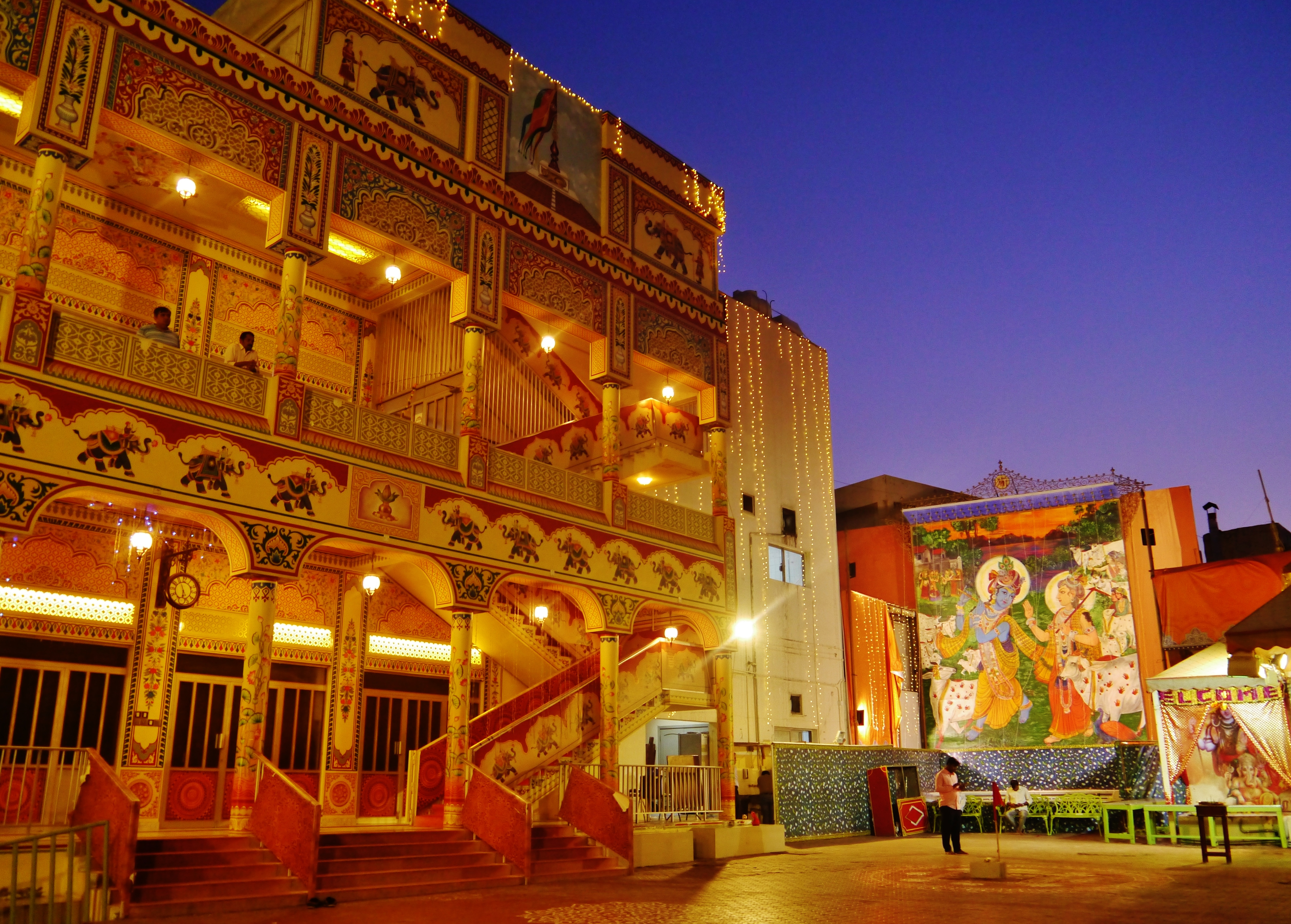
Shrinathji Temple in Manama

For the vast majority of its history Bahrain has been economically and culturally dependent on two regions, Assyrian and Meluhas the latter being Indians comprising the current state of Gujarat.

There is both literary and archaeological evidence of extensive trade between Ancient Mesopotamia and the Indus Valley civilization. Impressions of clay seals from the Indus Valley city of Lothal and Harappa were evidently used to seal bundles of merchandise, as clay seal impressions with cord or sack marks on the reverse side testify. Numerous Indus Valley seals have turned up at Ur and other Mesopotamian sites, far outnumbering even local seals which shows their preference for the Indian economic currencies and seals.

Location of the Dilmun burial mounds in Bahrain.

The "Persian Gulf" types of circular, stamped (rather than rolled) seals known from Dilmun, that appear at Lothal in Gujarat, India, and Failaka, as well as in Mesopotamia, are convincing corroboration of the long-distance sea trade. What the commerce consisted of is less known: timber and precious woods, ivory, lapis lazuli, gold, and luxury goods such as carnelian and glazed stone beads, pearls from the Persian Gulf, shell and bone inlays, were among the goods sent to Mesopotamia in exchange for silver, tin, woolen textiles, olive oil and grains. Copper ingots from Oman and bitumen which occurred naturally in Mesopotamia may have been exchanged for cotton textiles and domestic fowl, major products of the Indus region that are not native to Mesopotamia. Instances of all of these trade goods have been found. The importance of this trade is shown by the fact that the weights and measures used at Dilmun were in fact identical to those used by the Indus, and were not those used in Southern Mesopotamia.

"the ships of Dilmun, from the foreign land, brought him wood as a tribute".

Mesopotamian trade documents, lists of goods, and official inscriptions mentioning Meluhha supplement Harappan seals and archaeological finds. Literary references to Meluhhan trade date from the Akkadian, the Third Dynasty of Ur, and Isin-Larsa Periods (c. 2350–1800 BC), but the trade probably started in the Early Dynastic Period (c. 2600 BC). Some Meluhhan vessels may have sailed directly to Mesopotamian ports, but by the Isin-Larsa Period, Dilmun monopolized the trade. The Bahrain National Museum assesses that its "Golden Age" lasted ca. 2200-1600 BC. Discoveries of ruins under the Persian Gulf maybe of Dilmun.

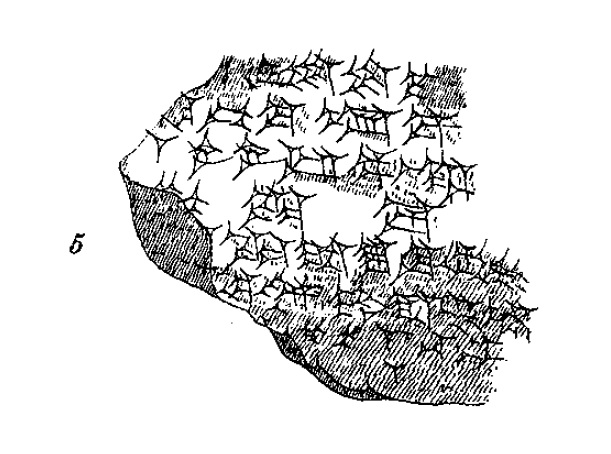
Correspondence between Ilī-ippašra, the governor of Dilmun, and Enlil-kidinni, the governor of Nippur, ca. 1350 BC.

In the Mesopotamian epic poem Epic of Gilgamesh, Gilgamesh had to pass through Mount Mashu, Jabal Shams, Land of Frankicense, Boswelia Sacra, Olibanum, Luban, Lebonah, at the mouth of the Strait of Hormuz, to reach Dilmun, Telmun, Mount Mashu is usually wrongly identified with the whole of the parallel Lebanon and Anti-Lebanon ranges, with the narrow gap between these mountains constituting the tunnel.

Dilmun, Dill, Qandil Mountains, Dilbat, Ad-Dilam, sometimes described as "the place where the sun rises", towards the East, Simurrum, and "the Land of the Living", is the scene of some versions of the Eridu Genesis, and the place where the deified Sumerian hero of the flood, Utnapishtim (Ziusudra), was taken by the gods to live forever. Thorkild Jacobsen's translation of the Eridu Genesis calls it "Mount Dilmun" which he locates as a "faraway, half-mythical place".

Dilmun is also described in the epic story of Enki and Ninhursag as the site at which the Creation occurred. The promise of Enki to Ninhursag, the Earth Mother:

For Dilmun, the land of my lady's heart, I will create long waterways, rivers and canals,
whereby water will flow to quench the thirst of all beings and bring abundance to all that lives.

Ninlil, the Sumerian goddess of air and south wind had her home in Dilmun. It is also featured in the Epic of Gilgamesh.

However, in the early epic "Enmerkar and the Lord of Aratta", the main events, which center on Enmerkar's construction of the ziggurats in Uruk and Eridu, are described as taking place in a world "before Dilmun had yet been settled".

The immigration of South Asians to Bahrain started in the late quarter of the 19th century and today Pakistanis, Bangladeshis, and Indians combined form the largest expatriate groups in Bahrain.

=== Indians ===
There were 197,273 Indian workers and 56,666 dependents as of 2014 and the majority of the public sector. There are multiple schools that were established in the country in the 20th century that offer the CBSE curriculum, the oldest of which is The Indian School which was first established in 1950.

=== Pakistanis ===
In 2014 there were 39,765 Pakistani workers in Bahrain and 8,647 dependents, a further 30,000 have been given citizenship. A 2011 estimate states that 10,000 of them serve in security forces. The vast majority of Pakistanis in Bahrain are Muslim.

=== Bangladeshis ===
Bangladesh recognized and established diplomatic ties with Bahrain in 1974, although Bangladeshi expatriates started arriving decades before that. In 2014 there were 92,193 working in Bahrain and 3,116 dependents.

== Others ==
=== Jews ===
Bahraini Jews constitute one of the world's smallest Jewish communities. Today the community has a synagogue and small Jewish cemetery and numbers thirty-seven persons.

=== Filipinos ===
In 2014 there were 25,568 Filipino workers in Bahrain and a further 3,189 dependents living there.

=== Egyptians ===
In 2014 there were 8,083 workers and 10,176 dependents living in Bahrain.

=== Sri Lankans ===
In 2014 there were 5,790 Sri Lankan workers in Bahrain and a further 1,632 dependents living there.

=== British ===
In 2014 there were 2,367 British workers in Bahrain and 1,710 dependents However, the Gulf News states there were 9,000 permanent British residents in 2013 and that 240 were given citizenship.
