= Hawar Islands =

Group of islands in the Gulf of Bahrain

Native name: Arabic: جزر حوار
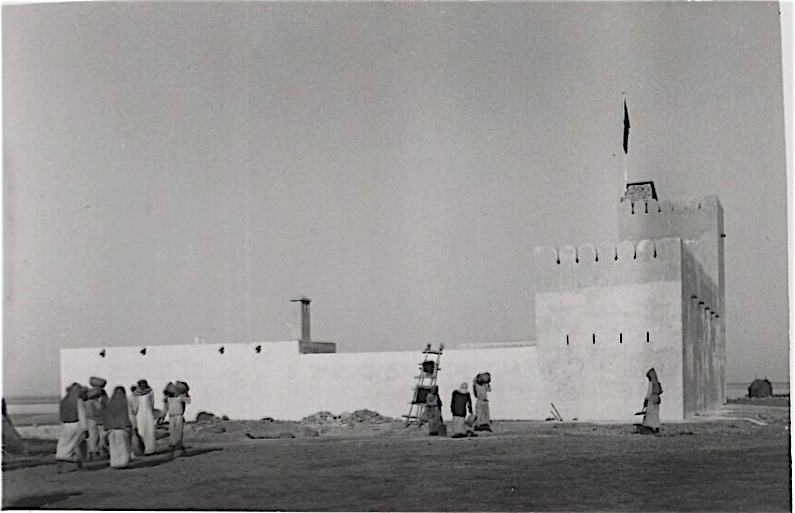
- Hawar Fort in 1938

- Location within Bahrain

Geography
- Location: Gulf of Bahrain
- Coordinates: 25.647°N 50.776°E
- Adjacent to: Persian Gulf
- Total islands: 16
- Major islands: Hawar Island
- Area: 52 km^{2} (20 sq mi)
- Highest elevation: 22 m (72 ft)

Administration
- Bahrain
- Governorate: Southern Governorate, ISO Code BH-14

Additional information
- Time zone: AST (UTC+3)

Designations

Ramsar Wetland
- Designated: 27 October 1997
- Reference no.: 920

The Hawar Islands (Arabic: جزر حوار; transliterated: Juzur Ḥawār) are an archipelago of desert islands; all but one are owned by Bahrain, while the southern, small, and uninhabited Jinan Island (Arabic: جزيرة جينان; transliterated: Jazīratu Jīnan) is administered by Qatar as part of its Al-Shahaniya municipality. The archipelago is situated off the west coast of Qatar in the Gulf of Bahrain of the Persian Gulf.

== Description ==
The islands used to be one of the settlements of the Bahraini branch of the Dawasir who settled there in the early 19th century. The islands were first surveyed in 1820, when they were called the Warden's Islands, and two villages were recorded. They are now uninhabited, other than a police garrison and a hotel on the main island; access to all but Hawar island itself is severely restricted. Local fishermen are allowed to fish in adjacent waters and there is some recreational fishing and tourism on and around the islands. Fresh water has always been scarce; historically it was obtained by surface collection and even today, with the desalination plant, additional supplies have to be brought in.

== Geography ==
Despite their proximity to Qatar (they are only about 1 nautical mile (1.9 km) from the Qatari mainland whilst being about 10 nautical miles (19 km) from the main islands of Bahrain), most of the islands belong to Bahrain, having been a part of a dispute between Bahrain and Qatar which was resolved in 2001. The islands were formerly coincident with the district or Minṭaqat Juzur Ḥawār (مِنْطَقَة جُزُر حَوَار) and are now administered as part of the Southern Governorate of Bahrain. The land area of the islands is approximately 52 km^{2} (20 sq mi).

Although there are 36 islands in the group, many of the smaller islands are little more than sand or shingle accumulations on areas of exposed bedrock molded by the ongoing processes of sedimentation and accretion. The World Heritage Site application named 8 major islands, which conforms to the description of the islands when first surveyed as consisting of 8 or 9 islands. It has often been described as an archipelago of 16 islands. Jinan Island, to the south of Hawar island, is not legally considered to be a part of the group and is owned by Qatar.

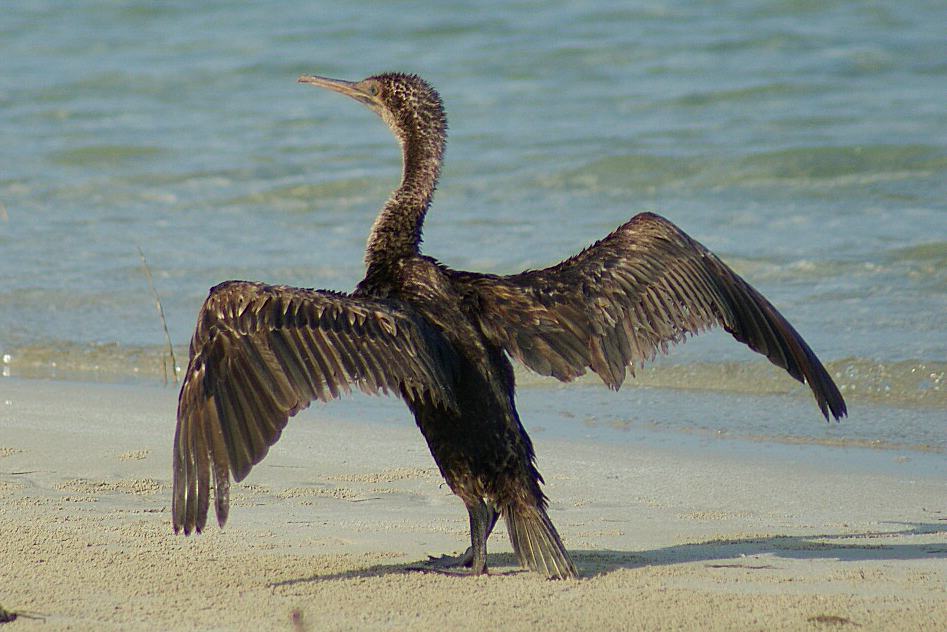
Socotra cormorant

== Flora and fauna ==
There are small herds of Arabian oryx and sand gazelle on Hawar island, and the seas around support sea turtles and a large population of dugongs.

The islands are home to many bird species. The archipelago has been designated an Important Bird Area by BirdLife International because it supports significant populations of western reef egrets, Socotra cormorants (with some 200,000–300,000 adults recorded in 1992, making it the largest known breeding concentration in the world), Saunders's and white-cheeked terns, and sooty falcons. Other breeding birds include Caspian and bridled terns, and ospreys. Wintering birds include great crested grebes and greater flamingos.

=== Conservation ===
The islands were listed as a Ramsar site in 1997. In 2002, the Bahraini government applied to have the islands recognised as a World Heritage Site due to their unique environment and habitat for endangered species; the application was ultimately unsuccessful.

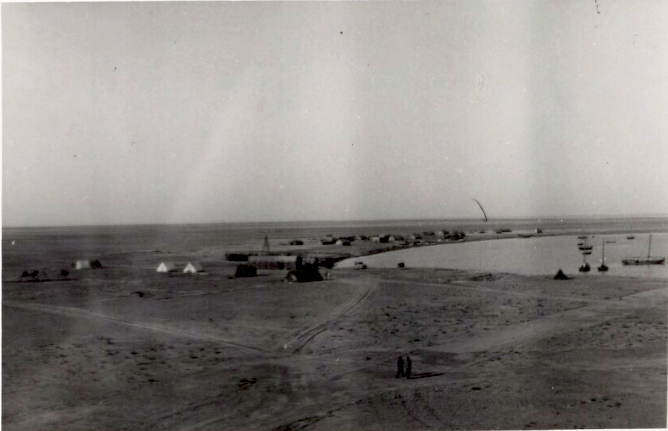
North village of Hawar in 1938

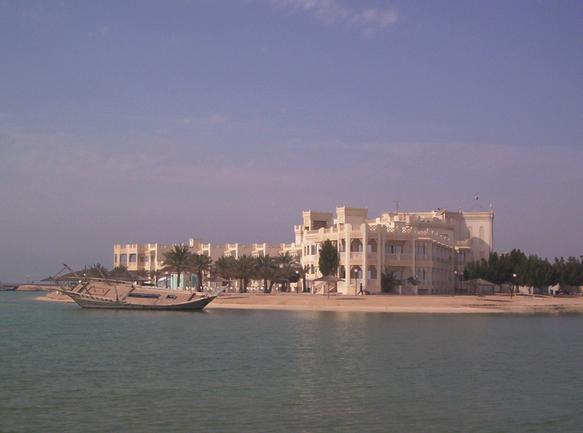
Hawar Islands Resort

== Administration ==
The islands were formerly coincident with the region or Minṭaqat of Juzur Ḥawār (مِنْطَقَة جُزُر حَوَار) and are now administered as part of the Southern Governorate of Bahrain.

Jinan Island is administered as part of Al-Shahaniya Municipality of Qatar.

== Access ==
The islands are connected through a 25 km (16 mi) ferry ride from Manama and are reported to have a potential to be developed as a beach tourism destination.

== List of islands ==
=== Hawar archipelago ===
By far the largest island is Hawar, which accounts for more than 41 km^{2} (16 sq mi) of the 54.5 km^{2} (21.0 sq mi) land area. Following in size are Suwād al Janūbīyah, Suwād ash Shamālīyah, Rubud Al Sharqiyah, Rubud Al Gharbiyah, and Muhazwarah (Umm Hazwarah).

Name	Arabic	Coordinates	Max height	Comments
Hawar	جَزِيرَة حَوَار	25°39′19″N 50°44′58″E	22 m (72 ft)	The island is 18 km (11 mi) long and varies in width from 5.2 to 0.9 km (3.23 to 0.56 mi). Continuous beach ridge complex west coast, sloping bedrock rising west to east. Complex bay and cliff formations east coast fronted in places by subqa, jebel and terminals of east lower headlands aeolian formations calcified reef structures and algal mats.
Suwād al Janūbīyah	سُوَاد اَلْجَنُوبِيَّة	25°38′33″N 50°47′59″E	4 m (13 ft)	South Suwad. Sand and shingle accumulations, subqa and salt-encrusted flats with areas of exposed surface rock, beach rock to the north. Mud, shoals and shallow to south, blown sand beaches. Host to a large Socotra cormorant colony, representing over 10% of the world population.
Suwād ash Shamālīyah	سُوَاد اَلشَّمَالِيَّة	25°40′29″N 50°48′36″E	3 m (9.8 ft)	North Suwad. Sand and shingle accumulations, subqa and salt-encrusted flats, areas of beach rock to north, shoals and shallow to south and southeast, wind blown sand, beaches.
Rubud Al Sharqiyah	رَبَض اَلشَّرْقِيَّة	25°45′03″N 50°46′54″E	0.8 m (2.6 ft)	East Rubud. Sand and shingle accumulations, subqa and salt-encrusted flats, storm beach north and northeast, mudflats, shoals and shallow lagoons south and east large areas of beach rock and reef. Islands off exposed beach rocks & vegetated islets. Significant western reef heron colony.
Rubud Al Gharbiyah	رَبَض اَلْغَرْبِيَّة	25°45′07″N 50°45′58″E	1 m (3.3 ft)	West Rubud. Sand and shingle accumulations, subqa and encrusted flats, storm beach north and west, mudflats, shoals and shallow lagoons south and east. Islands off exposed beach rocks & vegetated islets. Significant western reef heron colony.
Muhazwarah (Umm Hazwarah)		25°39′46″N 50°46′28″E	12.5 m (41 ft)	Rock (exposed strata), undercut cliffs, small sand or shingle beaches, raised marine terraces with sand spit southern aspect sand accumulations behind. Centre open wadi with rim rocks.
Umm Jinni	أم جني	25°40′31″N 50°47′05″E	0.5 m (1.6 ft)	Sand and shingle accumulations with areas of beach rock shoals and shallow lagoons surrounding.
Ajirah	جَزِيرَة عَجِيرَة	25°44′24″N 50°49′24″E	7 m (23 ft)	Rock (exposed strata), undercut cliffs and areas of beach rock and reefs. Single marine terrace with sand spit southwest sand and shingle accumulations behind.
Bū Sadād (Bu Sa’adad) (group)	جُزُر بُو سَدَاد	25°37′31″N 50°46′37″E	2 m (6.6 ft)	Sand and shingle accumulations with areas of beach rock, shoals and shallow lagoons surrounding. Storm beaches northern aspects. Islands off ‑ various with mud sand and exposed rocky vegetated islets.
Al Hajiyat (group)	الحجيات	25°42′00″N 50°48′00″E	7.5 m (25 ft)	Group of 3 islands. Rock (exposed strata), undercut cliffs terraced, small sand or shingle beaches, reefs.
Al Wukūr (Al Wakur) (group)	جُزُراَلْوُكُور	25°39′13″N 50°48′54″E	10 m (33 ft)	Isolated sea stacks with shingle beaches with surrounding shallow lagoon.
Bu Tammur (group)	بو تمور	25°37′00″N 50°47′00″E	1.5 m (4.9 ft)	Isolated undercut heavily fossilized rock platforms.

The following were not considered as part of the Hawar islands in the International Court of Justice (ICJ) judgment, being located between Hawar and the Bahrain Islands and not disputed by Qatar, but have been included in the Hawar archipelago by the Bahrain government as part of the 2002 World Heritage Site application.

Name	Arabic	Coordinates	Max height	Comments
Jazīrat Mashtān (Mashtan)	جَزِيرَة مَشْتَان	25°48′22″N 50°40′54″E		Northernmost island and the closest to Bahrain Island. Roughly equidistant between there and the northernmost of the Hawar islands, Rubud Al Gharbiyah. Although very small at high tide, at low tide Mashtan is considerably larger.
Al Mu`tariḑ	اَلْمُعْتَرِض	25°47′12″N 50°42′51″E		A reef south-east of Mashtan. Location of the largest sighting of dugong in the area.
Fasht Bū Thawr (Bu Thur)	فَشْت بُو ثَوْر	25°48′00″N 50°46′00″E		A low-tide elevation coral reef approximately 100 metres (330 feet) long.

=== Janan Island ===
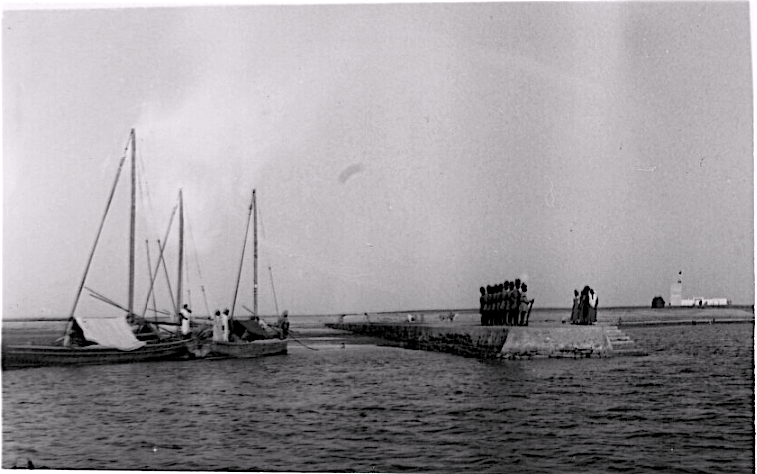
Hawar Pier in 1938.

Janan (or Jinan) Island, a small island south of Hawar island, was also considered in the 2001 ICJ judgment. Based on a previous agreement when both Qatar and Bahrain were under British occupation, it was judged to be separate from the Hawar islands and so considered by the court separately. It was awarded to Qatar.

Name	Arabic	Coordinates	Max height (meters)	Comments
Jazīrat Jinān (Janan)	جَزِيرَة جَنَان	25°33′29″N 50°44′06″E		A small island (or islands, if the low tide elevation of Hadd Janan is counted separately), 1.6 nautical miles (3.0 km) south of Hawar Island. It measures approximately 700 by 175 metres (2,297 by 574 ft) and with a total surface area of around 0.115 km^{2} (28 acres).

== See also ==
- Qatar v. Bahrain
- List of islands of Bahrain
