= Western Region, Bahrain =

Coordinates: 26°07′N 50°29′E

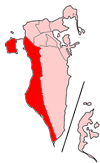
Map of Bahrain showing Al Mintaqah al Gharbiyah municipality

Western Region (Arabic: المنطقة الغربية Al-Minṭaqat al-Ḡarbiyya) was a municipality (mintaqah) of Bahrain in the western part of the country. Its territory is now in the Northern and Southern Governorates.

== See also ==
- Al Gharbiyah
