= Jidhafs =

Jidhafs جدحفص
- Town
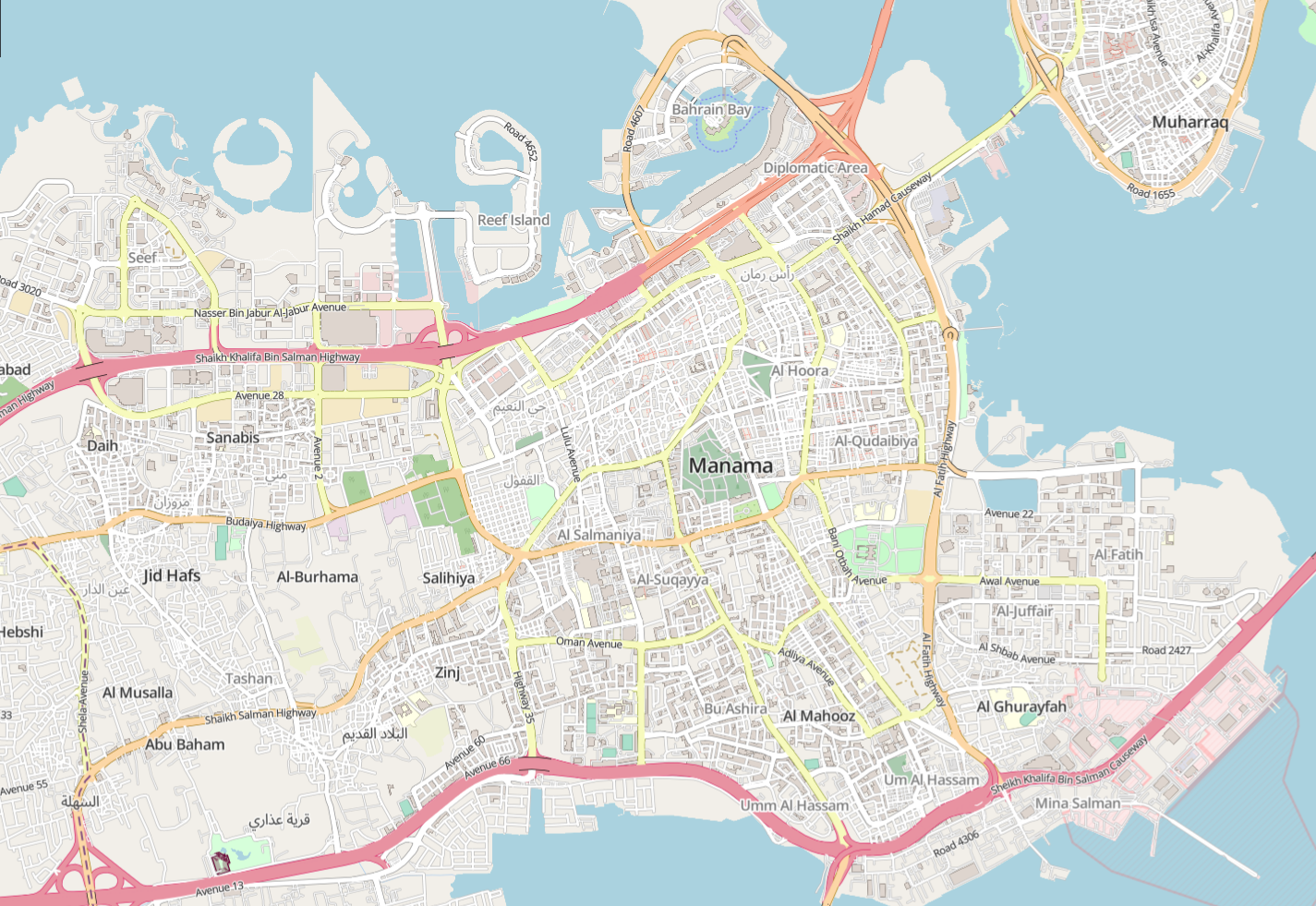
- Map of Manama including Jidhafs to the west.

- Location within Bahrain
- Coordinates: 26.219°N 50.538°E
- Country: Bahrain
- Governorate: Northern Governorate

Area
  - Total: 2.73 km^{2} (1.05 sq mi)

Population (2012)
  - Total: 66,588
  - Density: 24,400/km^{2} (63,200/sq mi)
- Time zone: UTC+03:00
- Area code: +973 17 55

Jidhafs (Arabic: جدحفص, romanized: Jid Ḥafṣ) is a town situated in Bahrain.

== Etymology ==
The Bahraini historian and researcher Mohammed bin Ali Al Tajer states in his book Aqd Al Lalali Fi Tarikh Awal that the word "Jid" translates to 'coast'. As such, the term 'Jid Hafs' is understood to translate to the "Coast of Hafs".

== History ==
An attack on a police bus in the area left one officer dead in 2017 which was blamed on alleged Iran-backed Shia militants. In 2021, Bahraini authorities defused a bomb planted in an ATM in Jidhafs.

== Healthcare ==
Jidhafs Maternity Hospital is based in the area, offering maternity services. Founded in October 1980 to relieve pressure on the obstetrics department at Salmaniya Medical Complex, it initially had 34 beds. It was expanded in 1984 to include operating theatres and had its first caesarean section shortly afterwards, and in 1990 a series of expansion projects saw the construction of two post-natal wards, an expansion of the paediatric ward, and construction of the hospital's laboratory, kitchen and pharmacy facilities. According to the Ministry of Health, the hospital has a capacity of 80 maternity beds and 20 neonatal beds. Jidhafs also has a separate 24-hour primary health centre that is accessible to local residents.

== Economy ==
The Jidhafs central market is presently being revamped with construction work aimed to be completed in 2027.

== Geography ==
It is about 3 km west of the capital city Manama. It is neighbored by the villages of Al Daih and Sanabis to the north, Al Musalla and Tashan to the south, Jeblat Hebshi and Muqsha to the west. The city's population was 44,769 in 1991. The Khalifa bin Salman highway passes alongside the town.

It was a municipality of Bahrain in the northern part of the country until 2002 when it was reorganised into the Northern Governorate and then reorganised again into the Capital Governorate territory.
