= Hamad Town =

City in Bahrain

Hamad Town مدينة حمد Madīnat Ḥamad
- Town
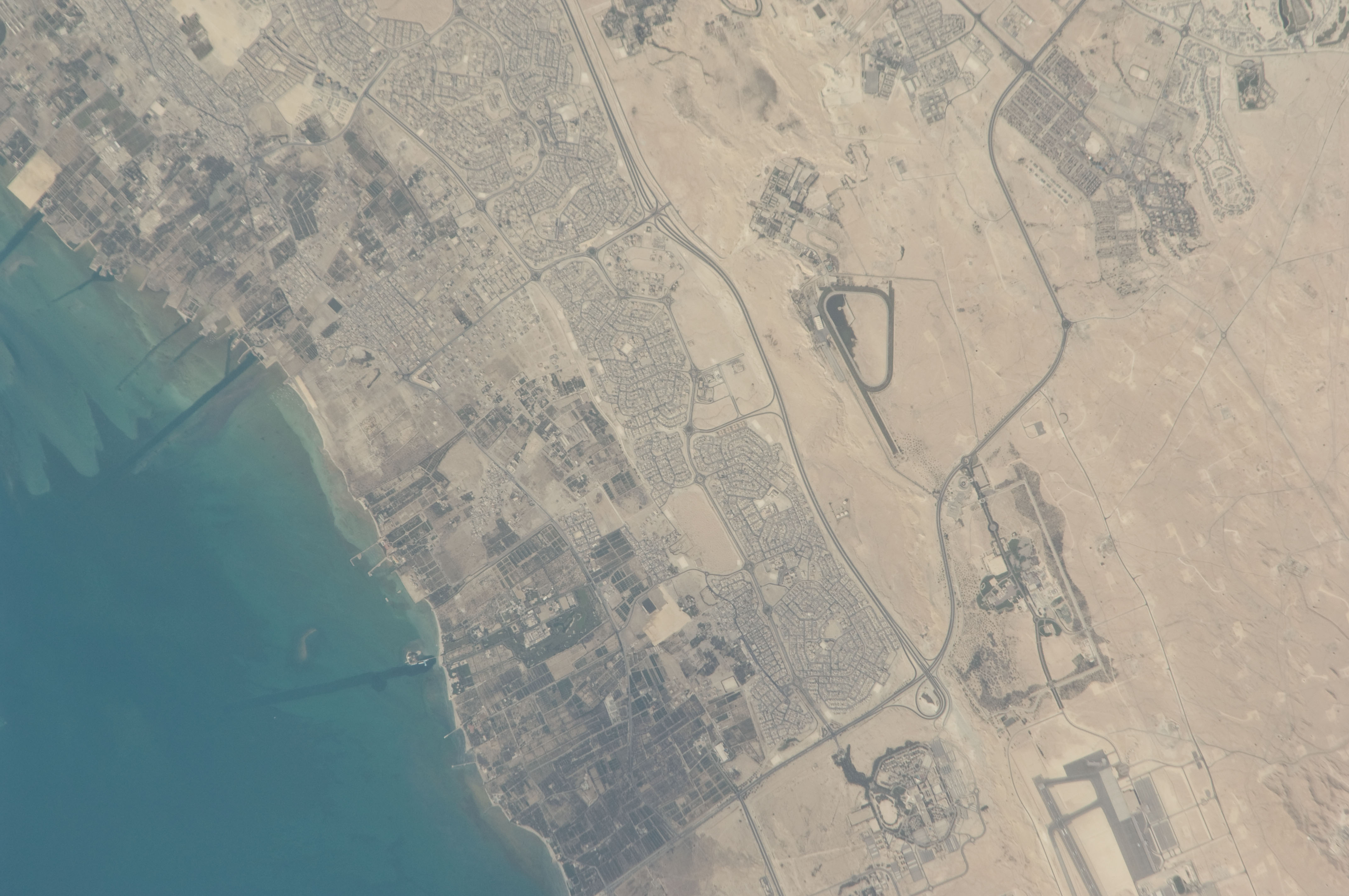
- Hamad Town as seen from the ISS in 2010

- Location in Bahrain
- Coordinates: 26°6′46″N 50°30′50″E
- Country: Bahrain
- Governorate: Northern Governorate
- Established: 1984

Population (2012)
  - Total: 133,550
  - Urban density: 3,118.8/sq mi (1,204.16/km^{2})

Madinat Hamad or Hamad Town (Arabic: مدينة حمد, romanized: Madīnat Ḥamad) is a primarily commuter city within northern Bahrain. It was a municipality of Bahrain in the central part of the country. Split from the municipality of Ar Rifa' wa al Mintaqah al Janubiyah in 1991, its territory is now in the Northern Governorate. Its name refers to the current king of Bahrain, Hamad Bin Isa Al Khalifa. The city is culturally diverse, housing a proportionally mixed Shia-Sunni population of varying socio-economic backgrounds, with no single ethnic or religious group making up the majority of inhabitants.

== History ==
Hamad Town was set up in 1984 as a 'housing town' where the government built council houses for those who could not afford the ever increasing house prices in other parts of the country. In 1990 the government opened the door of Bahrain to the Kuwaiti people who were suffering from the effects of the Gulf War with Iraq. It provided free houses and schools in Hamad Town allowed them to use the town's facilities. The Kuwaitis returned home in early 1991 at the end of the war. In 2001 the government gave the council houses to the people of Hamad town for free.

== Geography ==
Hamad Town is 18 km from the capital Manama and 19 km from the airport. It is close to the Sakhir area, which contains the huge Formula One motor racing circuit (Bahrain International Circuit), which is the biggest circuit in the Middle East.

Hamad Town is famous for its 22 roundabouts. Residential addresses are based on the number of the nearest roundabout. By 2005 the population of the town was 52718. It has now supplanted Isa Town in regard to population-density ranking.

== Law and government ==
Hamad Town is part of the North Governorate, one of four governorates of Bahrain. However, governorates are forbidden from passing their own laws and must abide by all national laws of the Kingdom of Bahrain.

== Economy ==
The people of Hamad Town tend to go the capital Manama to work. Most of Hamad Town is a residential area but there is a large shopping centre called Sooq Waqif which contains many shops and provides some employment in Hamad Town itself.

== Mosques ==
- Kanoo Mosque — Shakh Hamad road, between the second and third roundabouts
- Masjid Al Ajoor — tenth roundabout

== Transport ==
Bahrain International Airport is located 19.7 km from Hamad Town.

The town's road system consists of a series of roundabouts - 22 major numbered roundabouts and several unnamed roundabouts, - that serve as the arterial roads within the town. These roundabouts play a crucial role in facilitating transportation and communication within the town.

In addition to its extensive road system, Hamad Town also has some transport links with sparse public bus stops served by the Bahrain Public Transport Buses. These buses provide a convenient and affordable transportation option for those who prefer not to drive or do not have access to a personal vehicle.

It is served by the Shaikh Khalifa bin Salman Highway on the east, which has five highway exits located at Roundabout 0, Roundabout 6, Roundabout 14, Roundabout 18, and Roundabout 22 to the south. On the west, Hamad Town connects to Road 106, which connects to all the villages incorporated into the town.

== Demographics ==
Population (2001):166824.
Density: 1204.16/km²

== Neighbourhoods ==
Major areas close to Hamad Town:

- Sakhir
- Al Zallaq
- Riffa
- Hamala

== Education ==
The University of Bahrain has its main campus near Hamad Town (Sukheer).
