= Rifa and Southern Region, Bahrain =

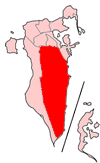
Map of Bahrain showing Ar Rifa' wa al Mintaqah al Janubiyah municipality

Rifa and Southern Region (Arabic: الرفاع والمنطقة الجنوبية Ar-Rifāʿ wal-Minṭaqat al-Janūbīyah) was a municipality of Bahrain in the southern part of the country. Its territory is now in the Central and Southern Governorates. Ar Rifa' wa al Mintaqah al Janubiyah's population in 2001 was 79,985.
