= Central Region, Bahrain =

Coordinates: 26°11′N 50°31′E

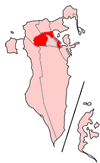
Map of Bahrain showing Al Mintaqah al Wusta municipality

Central Region (Arabic: المنطقة الوسطى Al-Minṭaqat al-Wusṭā) was a municipality of Bahrain in the northern part of the country. Its territory is now in the Central and Northern Governorates.
