= Northern Region, Bahrain =

Administrative region of Bahrain

Coordinates: 26°13′N 50°29′E

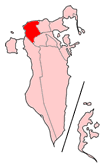
Map of Bahrain showing Al Mintaqah al Shamaliyah municipality

Northern Region (Arabic: المنطقة الشمالية Al-Minṭaqat aš-Šamālīyah) was an administrative region of Bahrain in the northern part of the country. Its territory is now in the Northern Governorate.
