= Southern Governorate =

Governorate of Bahrain

Coordinates: 25°55′12″N 50°33′00″E

Southern Governorate المحافظة الجنوبية
- Governorate
- Flag

- Map of Bahrain showing Southern Governorate
- Country: Bahrain

Government
  - Governor: Khalifa bin Ali Al Khalifa

Area
  - Total: 488.85 km^{2} (188.75 sq mi)

Population (2020 Census)
  - Total: 305,547
  - Density: 625.03/km^{2} (1,618.8/sq mi)
- Time zone: UTC+3 (Arabia Standard Time)
- Website: www.southern.gov.bh

The Southern Governorate (Arabic: المحافظة الجنوبية, romanized: Al-Muḥāfaẓat al-Janūbīyah) has the largest area of the four governorates of Bahrain. It includes parts of Bahrain's old municipalities – Al Mintaqah al Gharbiyah, Ar Rifa' wa al Mintaqah al Janubiyah, and Juzur Hawar (the Hawar Islands). It has the second smallest population of the governorates on Bahrain after Al Muharraq.

The Governor of the Southern Governorate is Shaikh Khalifa bin Ali Al Khalifa (born 1993), the grandson of former Prime Minister Prince Khalifa bin Salman Al Khalifa and the son of Shaikh Ali bin Khalifa Al Khalifa, the deputy prime minister.

== Regions ==
- Riffa
- Ma'ameer
- Awali
- Askar
- Jaww
- Al Dur
- Zallaq
- Hawar Islands
- Khalifa City
- Sakhir
- Durrat Al Bahrain
