= Central Governorate, Bahrain =

Coordinates: 26°11′N 50°31′E

Central Governorate المحافظة الوسطى Al-Muḥāfaẓat al-Wusṭā
- Governorate
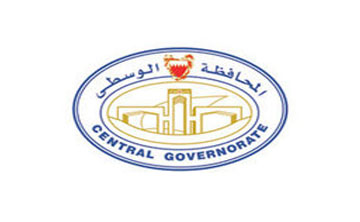
- Flag

- Map of Bahrain showing Central Governorate
- Country: Bahrain

Government
  - Governor: Mubarak Bin Ahmed Al Fadel
- Time zone: UTC+3 (Arabia Standard Time)

The Central Governorate (Arabic: المحافظة الوسطى, romanized: Al-Muḥāfaẓat al-Wusṭā) is a now defunct administrative governorate in the Kingdom of Bahrain.

Established in 2001 by royal decree, it was one of five governorates in Bahrain until September 2014 when it was dissolved and split between the capital, northern and southern governorates respectively.

== Geography ==
The central governorate included 9 constituencies represented in the Bahraini parliament. Notable settlements in the governorate include the towns of Isa Town, Tubli, Salmabad, Jid Ali, Sitra and A'ali amongst other villages such as Nuwaidrat and Ma'ameer. The area has a heavy industrial base with an estimated 500 factories being situated in the former governorate. Plans to establish a labour town in the Salmabad area to house foreign labourers working in the factories were announced in 2010.

== Dissolution ==
The governorate dissolved in September 2014 by royal decree from the King of Bahrain ahead of the 2014 Bahraini parliamentary elections. Out of the governorate's 9 constituencies, the southern governorate gained 4 constituencies, the northern governorate gained 3, and the capital governorate gained the final 2 constituencies. The central municipal council and municipality were also dissolved as a result.

In 2022, Riyadh Kuwaitan, a candidate in the 2022 Bahraini parliamentary elections called for the central governorate to be reinstated, arguing that the needs of residents in the region were being neglected. Kuwaitan received the fewest votes in his contested constituency.
