= Dan Feferman =

Israel and Middle East analyst

- Born: 1982 (age 43–44)
- Occupations: speaker, author, security analyst
- Organization: Sharaka
- Website: danfeferman.com

Dan Feferman is a speaker, author, and analyst of Israel, the Middle East, and the Jewish world. He is the chairman of Sharaka, a non-governmental organization that promotes cooperation between Israeli and Gulf leaders based on the Abraham Accords.

== Biography ==
Dan Feferman was born in South Bend, Indiana in 1982. He attended Penn High School, then went on to Indiana University and the American University. He moved to Israel in 2005 and served for eight years in the Israel Defense Forces as an intelligence officer. As a reservist, he holds the rank of Major. He earned an MA in Security Studies from Tel Aviv University. He lives with his family in Rehovot.

== Career and activism ==
Feferman is a former fellow of the Jewish People Policy Institute and has worked with advisory, research, and public relations firms in Israel.

He was named Sharaka's executive director when the organization formed in 2020. Speaking on behalf of the organization, he has told the press that Hamas "has no positive vision for our society." In 2024, addressing an audience at Brandeis University, he said of Israeli, Arab, and other regional moderates that it is “now more important than ever for us to find common enemies: ISIS, climate change, Iran.”

Feferman was part of a 2021 delegation that toured the United States to speak to audiences about the Abraham Accords. The delegation included Emirati Fulbright Scholar Omar Al Busaidy, diplomat Lorena Kahteeb, journalist Hayvi Bouzo, peace activist Fatema Al Harbi, and artist Chama Mechtaly.

Feferman was one of the principals of the Partners for Peace initiative, launched in 2025 as a joint project between Sharaka and the Jewish Community Relations Council of Greater Washington.

He has appeared in numerous news outlets as an expert on Israel and the Middle East, including The Jerusalem Strategic Tribune, Ynet News, Fox News, The Jerusalem Post, The Times of India, and TV7 Israel News. He reported to the Wilson Center on a 2023 trip organized by Sharaka that brought 23 Moroccans to Israel for their first visit.

Feferman is the author of Rising Streams, Reform and Conservative Judaism in Israel (2018) and In Search of Authenticity: New Expressions of Jewish life in North America (2022). He is the host of the podcast Juanced.
