= Chama =

Chama may refer to:

== Places ==
- Chama, Costilla County, Colorado, unincorporated town in the United States
- Chama, Huerfano County, Colorado, an unincorporated town in the United States
- Chama, New Mexico, village in the United States
- Chama District, district in Zambia
  - Chama, Zambia, a small town
- Chama River (Venezuela), aka Río Chama, a river in Venezuela
- Rio Chama, a tributary of the Rio Grande
- Chama (Maya site), an archaeological site in the Alta Verapaz, Guatemala

== People ==
- Chama (surname)
- Chama people or Ese Ejja people
- Chama (archbishop of Kalocsa), 12th-century Hungarian prelate
- Chama Mechtaly (born 1992), Moroccan artist
- Chama Milind (born 1994), Indian cricketer

== Other ==
- Chama (bivalve), a genus of bivalve molluscs
- -chama, a Japanese honorific
- Chama, a variant name of Kamadeva, the Hindu god of love
- Chama (investment), a Swahili word meaning a welfare or investment group of people i.e. Merry-go-round fund raising group
- MV Chama, a Dutch tanker in service 1947-55
- Chama (album), by American heavy metal band Soulffly
