= Al Naimi =

Al Naimi may refer to:

- Al Nuaimi, the ruling royal family of Ajman, United Arab Emirates
- Na'im, Arab tribe in the United Arab Emirates and other Arab states
- Abdulla Majid Al Naimi (born 1982), Bahraini formerly detained in Guantanamo Bay
- Ali Al-Naimi (born 1935), Saudi politician
- Ali bin Majid Al-Naimi (fl. from 2018), Bahraini lawyer and politician
- Fazlallah Astarabadi, pen name Naimi, 14th cventury Iranian mystic
- Huda al-Naimi (fl. from 2000), Qatari medical physicist and writer
- Ibrahim Fahad Al Naimi (fl. 2014), Free Syrian Army general
- Majed bin Ali Al-Naimi (fl. from 2001), Bahraini academic
- Mashel Al Naimi (born 1983), Qatari motorcycle racer
- Mubaraka Al-Naimi (born 2001), Qatari tennis player
- Samira Saleh Ali al-Naimi (1963–2014), Iraqi human rights activist and lawyer
- Yuval Naimy (born 1985), Israeli basketball player
