= Sitra Mall =

Shopping mall in Sitra, Bahrain

Sitra Mall is a multi-storey shopping mall located in Sitra, Bahrain. It opened in 2006 and covers an area of 46,838 square meter. It is located adjacent to Tubli Bay and neighbors Al Noor International School, a Toyota/Lexus car showroom and the Sitra Causeway which connects Sitra island to the capital city Manama and Nabih Saleh island. The mall can hold up to 118 outlets. It is the first mall in Bahrain to have a waterfront view.

== History ==
It was also Bahrain's first mall to ban smoking in public.

As a result of the 2011 civil unrest that gripped the kingdom and local violence in Sitra, the mall has turned into a dead mall, as the violence deterred future tenants from the mall.

During the COVID-19 pandemic in Bahrain, the mall was converted into a mass vaccination centre by the Ministry of Health in 2021.

== Facilities ==
The mall contains many fashion stores and previously housed the hypermarket Le Marchè. It has since been replaced with Aswaq al-Helli. It also features a parking lot that can hold up to 850 vehicles.

== See also ==
- List of shopping malls in Bahrain
