= Sitra Causeway =

Coordinates: 26.185°N 50.590°E

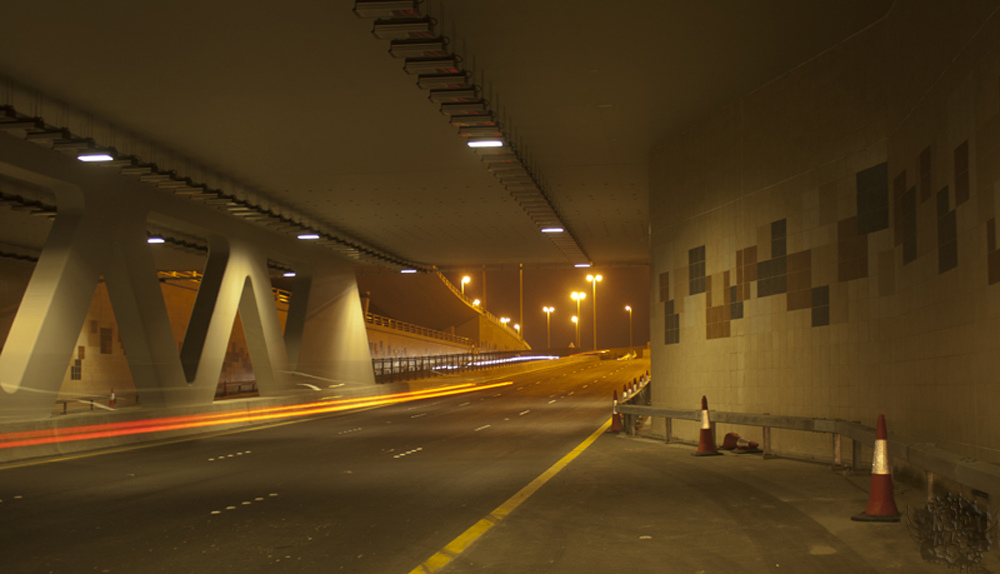
The newly built underpass of the Um Al Hassam junction

The Sitra Causeway consists of a series of bridges and causeways constructed in the Kingdom of Bahrain. The causeway is part of Shaikh Jaber Al Ahmed Al Sabah Highway and connects the island of Nabih Saleh and Sitra, to the capital city Manama across Tubli Bay.

Originally constructed in the early 1970s, a $266 million reconstruction plan was announced in 2006 which involved building two new bridges as well as reconstructing the Umm Al Hassam traffic junction, in order to ease traffic congestion. The project was finished in mid-2010, a year behind schedule. The new bridges were designed to have a 120-year lifespan.

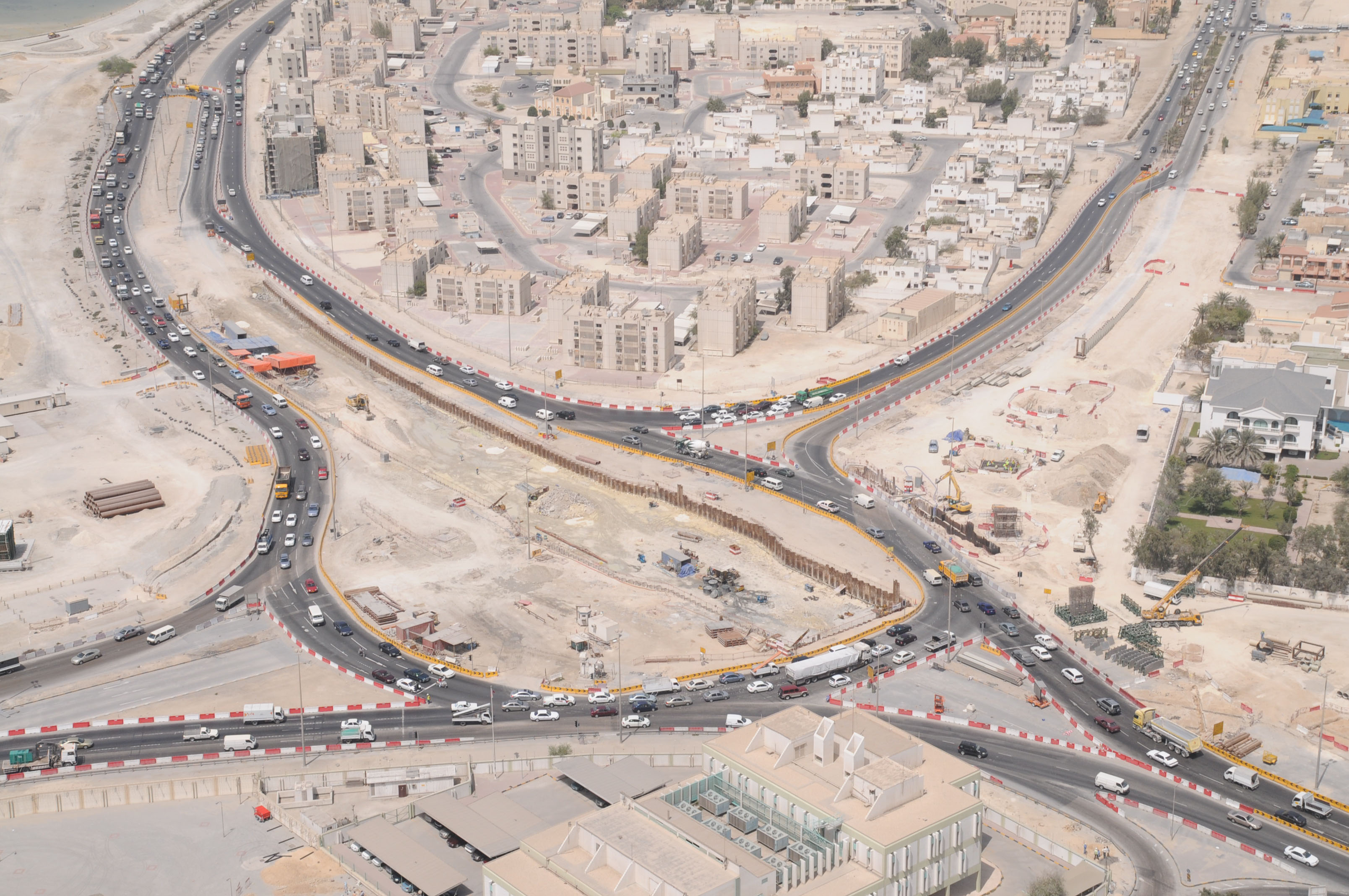
Aerial view of the construction site, near the north bridge, in 2009.

== Structure ==
The construction consists of two bridges and a causeway, with a total length of 3.2 km:

- The north bridge is 200 m long and 58 m wide, and runs from Umm Al Hassam on the southern edge of Manama to a causeway.
- The 2.7 km embankment (or causeway) that connects the north bridge to the south bridge, and passes by the island of Nabih Saleh through Tubli bay.
- The 400 m long and 55 m wide south bridge connects the causeway to the island of Sitra, close to the Sitra Mall.
