= Chama Central =

National Assembly constituency in Zambia

Chama Central is a constituency of the National Assembly of Zambia. It was created in 2026 by taking part of Chama North and part of Chama South. It covers the town of Chama in Chama District.

== List of MPs ==
Election year	MP	Party
2026	Yotam Mtayachalo	National Reconciliation Party for Unity and Prosperity
