= Tubli =

Tubli التوبلي
- Town
- Bahrain Map monument in Tubli

- Location in Bahrain
- Coordinates: 26°11′20″N 50°33′0″E
- Country: Bahrain
- Governorate: Capital Governorate
- Time zone: +03:00

Tubli (Arabic: التوبلي) is a large town situated in the Kingdom of Bahrain. It overlooks the eponymous Tubli Bay, which is a designated Ramsar Wetland of International Importance. During winter, horses can be a common site along Tubli’s streets.

== Geography ==
Tubli is located along the eastern inland coastline of the main Bahrain Island, overlooking Tubli Bay. Across the bay to the east lie the islands of Nabih Saleh and Sitra. Tubli also lies south of the capital city, Manama. It is part of the Capital Governorate.

The town is accessible from Manama through the famous Bahrain Map monument traffic flyover junction. The junction was renovated in 2008 and opened to traffic in 2009 at a cost of $26.5 million dollars (10 million Bahraini dinars).

Illegal land reclamation since the 1990s have threatened Tubli Bay's marine ecosystem along with their expansive mangrove forests and is the subject of frequent awareness campaigns by local residents.

== Economy ==
The Capital Trustees Board, which governs the capital governorate, was planning on relocating its offices to Tubli by the end of 2025. Tubli is home to its own walkway.

Tubli is the site of Bahrain's largest wastewater treatment plant: Tubli WPCC. The plant began expansion work in 2024 to expand its daily flow capacity from 200,000 cubic metres to 400,000 cubic metres, effectively doubling the plant’s capacity. Unfortunately, the wastewater treatment plant is a constant source of odor pollution for Tubli’s residents.

== See also ==
- Isa Town
- Zinj
