= Sharaka =

Intergovernmental cooperative organization

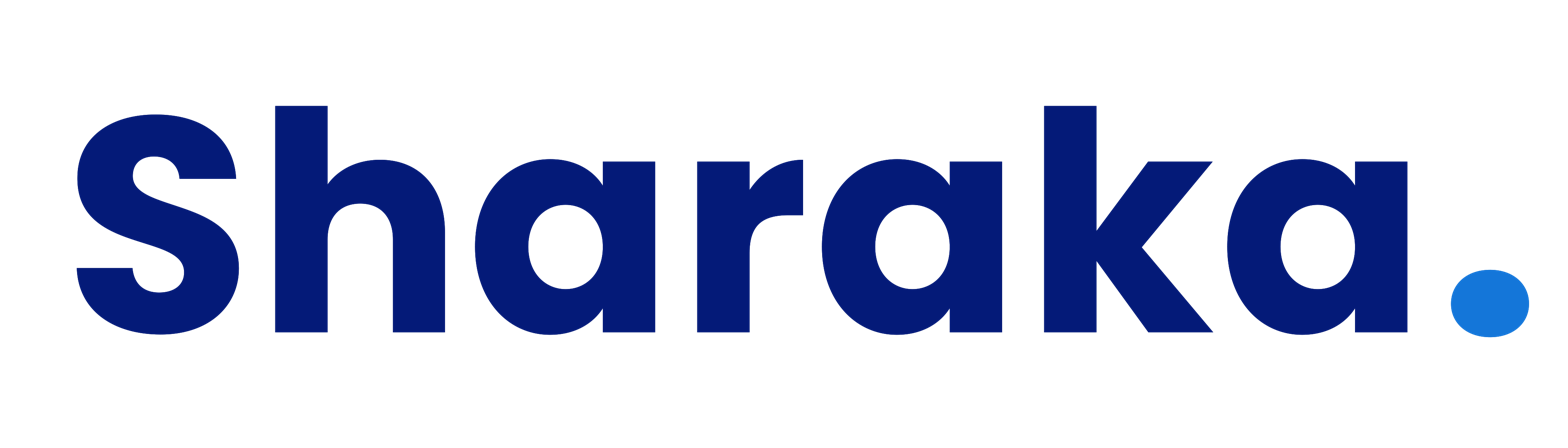
- Formation: December 2020
- Founders: Amit Deri
- Key people: Dan Feferman; Fatema Al Harbi; Ofir Ohayon; Najat Al-Saied
- Website: sharakango.com

Sharaka (Arabic: شراكة, romanized: sharāka, lit. 'partnership/cooperation') is a non-profit and non-governmental organization established in 2020 by people from Israel, the United Arab Emirates, and Bahrain after the signing of the Abraham Accords. The stated mission of the organization is to develop bonds between young Israeli and Gulf leaders, in order to strengthen peace, trust, and cooperation between the respective societies. The organization presently has three operational divisions located in Israel, Bahrain, and the United Arab Emirates.

== Background ==
Sharaka was established in 2020 by people from Israel, Bahrain, and the United Arab Emirates, with funding from Israeli and American donors. The idea of establishing the organization took shape after the signing of the Abraham Accords between the countries. The organization's primary goal is to "lead social initiatives that bring Israel's voice to strengthen familiarity with the State of Israel in the Arab world and create cooperation between young people in Israel and Arab states."

== Activities ==
Sharaka has brought delegations of leaders, influencers, and activists representing academia, art, politics, education, and the hospitality industry from various countries to Israel. These diverse delegations both learn about each other's history, society and geopolitical realities, and share their own culture and perspectives. first through online activities during the pandemic, and now increasingly through meetings and delegations.

=== Delegations to Israel ===
In mid-December 2020, Sharaka organized a delegation of 11 opinion leaders and social activists from the Gulf to visit Israel. The group arrived on December 11 and traveled throughout the country, from Jerusalem to the Golan Heights, meeting Jewish, Druze, and Bedouin Israelis along the way, including President Reuven Rivlin and Minister of Foreign Affairs Gabi Ashkenazi. The delegates participated in a Hanukkah menorah-lighting ceremony at the Western Wall. They also visited the Yad Vashem Holocaust Remembrance Center, the Knesset, and the Israel Museum. The delegates faced backlash online from anti-Israel and anti-normalization voices in their home countries as they took to social media to share their experiences and to reaffirm messages of peace and coexistence.

In October 2021, a 9-member delegation from Bahrain officially linked to Sharaka made a trip to Israel, headed by author and peace activist Fatema Al Harbi, who serves as vice chairman of Sharaka's Bahrain chapter. The delegates included Bahraini businessmen and officials with Bahrain's Education Ministry. The trip consisted of tours of Yad Vashem, the Old City of Jerusalem, and various historical and religious sites, as well as meetings with Israeli government officials and activists.

On 8 May 2022, a 15-member delegation of Pakistanis and Pakistani Americans visited Israel in a trip organized by Sharaka in partnership with the American Muslim and Multifaith Women's Empowerment Council. Delegates included Fishel Benkhald, considered to be the "last Jew in Pakistan", and prominent Pakistani journalist Ahmed Quraishi, who was later fired by the state-run Pakistan Television for being part of the delegation. The group visited Yad Vashem, met with Israeli President Isaac Herzog and other Israeli officials at Beit HaNassi (the president's residence in Jerusalem) and visited Druze and Bedouin homes in northern Israel. The visit was vehemently criticized by Pakistani officials, who denied that the delegation was on an official visit.

In March 2023, delegates from Algeria, Bahrain, Iraq, Lebanon, Morocco, and Turkey visited Israel to learn about the Holocaust as a way of promoting tolerance. The group visited Yad Vashem: The World Holocaust Memorial Center in Jerusalem, among other places.

=== Holocaust commemorations ===
On January 27, 2021, Sharaka organized an online event to commemorate International Holocaust Remembrance Day, with Israeli, Gulf and Arab participants. The event featured a testimony by Jewish Auschwitz survivor Vera Kriegel and a speech by Israeli President Reuven Rivlin.

In April 2022, a number of social-media influencers and journalists from Lebanon, Syria, Morocco, Turkey, Israel, the Palestinian territories, and the Gulf countries took part in the International March of the Living, visiting concentration camps and annual Holocaust memorial events in a trip organized by Sharaka.

=== United States ===
In November 2021, Sharaka delegates from Israel, Morocco, Syria, and the Gulf made a trip to the San Francisco Bay Area in California to tout the benefits of strengthened relations between Israel, Bahrain, and the United Arab Emirates following the signing of Abraham Accords, and to discuss and promote regional peace. The delegation included Syrian-born American journalist Hayvi Bouzo, Moroccan artist and activist Chama Mechtaly, and Sharaka leaders from Israel and the Gulf countries. The group met with Jewish leaders, local politicians and activists, and students. The visit included panel discussions and presentations at synagogues and Jewish cultural centers, San Jose State University, and the Commonwealth Club of California, where Sharaka leaders urged the American audience to "put aside the political polarization" when approaching the Middle East.

In April 2022, the University of Connecticut’s Abrahamic Programs co-hosted a discussion welcoming Sharaka. The event was a collaboration between UConn's Abrahamic Programs; UConn's Office of Diversity, Inclusion, and Justice; Center for Judaic Studies & Contemporary Jewish Life; UConn Hillel; Middle Eastern Cultural Programs; Muslim Students Association; and the Consulate General for Israel. Sharaka delegation members related their experiences of visiting other nations and establishing real connections on the person-to-person level, as well as their reasons for joining the organization.

In August 2021, a Sharaka delegation visited Atlanta, Georgia to discuss The Abraham Accords. Conferences were held at Congregations Or Hadash in Sandy Springs, hosted by the Consulate General of Israel to the Southeast, the Jewish Federation of Greater Atlanta, the Atlanta Rabbinical Association and the Atlanta Israel Coalition, and at Congregation Ohr HaTorah, in conjunction with Congregation Beth Jacob and hosted by Americans United with Israel and the Israel Consulate General.

=== United Arab Emirates and Bahrain ===
In April 2021, Sharaka organized a special ceremony in Dubai where Emiratis and Israeli Jews gathered for joint Ramadan and Lag BaOmer festivities. The event included the Lag BaOmer custom lighting of a bonfire, and a traditional Ramadan iftar meal.

In November 2021, Sharaka hosted joint celebrations in Dubai to mark the UAE's 50th National Day, and to celebrate Hanukkah.

In December 2021, leaders of Sharaka and of the Abraham Accords Peace Institute met at a private event at Emirates Palace in Abu Dhabi to sign a cooperation agreement (MoU) to promote and further strengthen ties laid by the Abraham Accords, in the presence of AAPI Chairman and former senior presidential advisor Jared Kushner as well as a number of senior Emirati politicians.

In January 2022, Sharaka signed an agreement with The UK Abraham Accords Group, headed by former Defence Minister and MP Dr. Liam Fox and attended by the Emirati Ambassador to the UK.

On 16 January 2022, Sharaka led tree-planting ceremonies in Dubai in honor of Tu Bishvat. The next day, similar events were held at the Neot Kdumim Park in Israel, and in Bahrain. The events were held in collaboration with the Fakhruddin Group and the Storey Group (Dubai) and the Jewish National Fund USA (Israel).

In May 2022, members of the Sharaka delegation attended a memorial organized by the Dubai's Jewish community to express their condolences and pay their respects to the Emirati community after President Sheikh Khalifa bin Zayed al-Nahyan's death.

== Staff ==
Amit Deri is the Chairman and a Co-Founder of Sharaka. He is Israeli and also founded and heads Reservists on Duty, DiploAct, Atidna (a youth movement that works to Israeli Arabs integrate into society), and the Tavor Youth Leadership Academy. Dan Feferman is Co-Chairman. He is an Israeli-American author, speaker, researcher; further, he is also a former IDF intelligence officer and IDF national security analyst. Noam Meirov is Managing Director of Sharaka. He is an Israeli social activist, and advocate for Arab-Jewish relations.

In late 2020, Bahraini author Fatema Al Harbi became involved with Sharaka. In November 2020 she visited Israel for the first time as part of a Sharaka delegation of Emiratis visiting Israeli Jews and Israeli Arab Muslims, Christians, and Druze. She was the first non-government Bahraini to visit Israel. When she returned to Bahrain she found that she had achieved notoriety as "the girl who went to Israel," and she was subject to death threats.

Following her visit, Al Harbi decided to quit her job to work for Sharaka full-time, advocating for peace. She visited Israel again in October 2021, and said: "As soon as I landed there, ... I saw how friendly the people were... People we didn’t know at all kept approaching us, asking, 'Are you from Bahrain or Dubai?' They kept saying, 'Welcome to Israel!'" She also visited Yad Vashem, Israel's memorial museum to the Holocaust, and posted about it on Instagram and Twitter. This time upon her return to Bahrain most reactions were positive, with some people approaching her to ask how they could visit Israel.

In 2023, Al Harbi became the Director of Gulf Affairs at Sharaka, and is the head of its Bahrain branch in Manama. As part of her work with Sharaka, Al Harbi has since visited Israel two other times. She has also visited the United States on Sharaka speaking tours. In 2022 and 2023, she was part of Sharaka's delegation to the March of the Living in Poland, a Holocaust commemoration event, and the site of the Auschwitz extermination camp.

== See also ==
- Israel–United Arab Emirates normalization agreement
- Bahrain–Israel normalization agreement
- Seeds of Peace
