= Ahmed Al Harz =

Bahraini Shia Muslim cleric and jurist

- أحمد آل حرز
- Born: Ahmed bin Abdul Ridha bin Hussein bin Mohammed bin Abdullah Al Harz; 1268 AH (1851–1852); Nabih Saleh, Bahrain
- Died: October 26, 1918; Manama, Bahrain

Sheikh Ahmed bin Abdul Ridha bin Hussein bin Muhammad bin Abdullah Al Harz (Arabic: الشيخ أحمد بن عبد الرضا بن حسين بن محمد بن عبد الله آل حرز, ca. 1851 [1268 AH], Nabih Saleh, Bahrain—October 26, 1918 [Muharram 21, 1337 AH], Manama) was a Bahraini Shia Muslim cleric and jurist. He was among the leading figures in the Shi’ite community of Bahrain at the time.

== Early life ==
Al Harz was born on the Bahraini island of Nabih Saleh around 1851, and his father died at an early age, leaving him in the custody of his two brothers and his wealthy uncle Mohsen Al Harz. Since Ahmed was more inclined to religion than the family trade, he was sent by his uncle to Bandar Lengeh, a city in Persia where he studied with Muhammad Al Harz and Muhammad Sharaf Al-Mousawi, then moved on to the Hawza Najaf, first at the Karbala branch and then to the Najaf one, for further studies. One of Al Harz's Najaf classmates, Mohammed Kazem Yazdi, went on to be the supreme religious authority among Shiites. After finishing his studies, Al Harz settled in Muscat, where he taught for many years.

== Return to Bahrain ==
The Al Harz family returned to Bahrain around 1899 (1317 AH) and settled in Jidhafs with the villagers’ blessing. In a short while, Ahmad Al Harz took over the sharia judiciary, built his own house, and began holding Friday prayers in the village of Shakhurah while moving his collection of manuscripts to the Sidra mosque near Jidhafs. A grandee from Dubai ultimately donated the money to build the Jidhafs Mosque in 1912.

His contemporaries included Khalaf and Salman Al Asfoor, Ali bin Abdullah Al-Sitri, Adnan Al Mousawi, Muhammad Sharif, Nasser Al-Mubarak, Mohammed bin Ali Al Tajir.

== Students and legacy ==
Some historians consider the arrival of the Harz family to Jidhafs as the catalyst for reviving Shiite thought on the island, including Al Tajir in his book The String of Pearls in the History of Awal, written in the early 1940s but published with Ebrahim Bashmi editing in 1994. Al-Tajir wrote:

In the past, denizens of the forum of knowledge crowded the city, but nowadays it is said to be more populated than ever in a continuous ebb and flow of Allah.

== Death ==
Ahmed Al Harz died on October 26, 1918, at the American Mission Hospital in Manama, then the only hospital in the country. Abdullah bin Maatuq al Qatifi gave the last rites, and Al Harz was buried in the Al-Imam Cemetery in Jidhafs.

== Work ==
- إحباء الأحباء في تسوية النصوص بين تقليد الأموات والأحياء (“Honoring family in reconciling texts between emulating the dead and the living”), on the subject of marja’ (authority to have one's guidance followed in Twelver Shia Islam
- He had some scholarly correspondence with his colleague Yadzi, along with some Friday sermons and other effects, but according to Ghayat Al-Maram in the History of the Media by Baqer:

Almost all of it was destroyed or lost, and what survives is illegible due to the ravages of time.
