= Al Qaryah =

Al Qaryah (Arabic: القَرية, lit. 'the village') is a residential village located on the island of Sitra in Bahrain. It is not to be confused with two eponymous village, one on the island of Nabih Saleh, and another, named Al Qurayyah, in western Bahrain.
