= Siege of Eker =

- Part of the Bahraini uprising
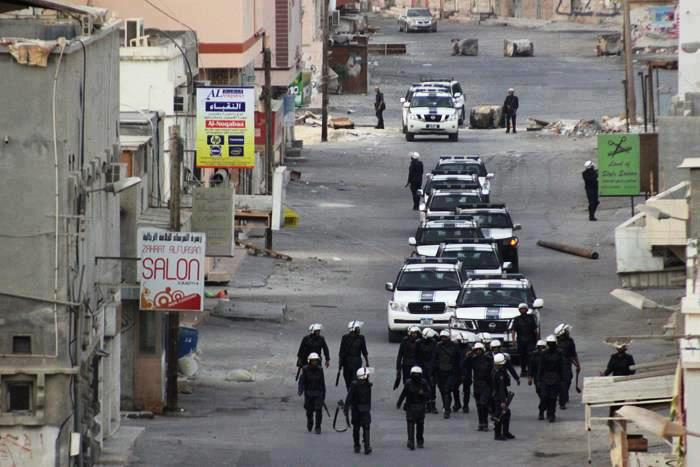
- Bahraini security forces and police SUVs patrolling the besieged village of Eker, Bahrain, 20 Oct 2012
- Type: Siege
- Location: Eker, Bahrain
- Target: Finding the perpetrator for Imran Ahmed's death (Government claim)
- Date: 19 October 2012 – ?

The siege of Eker refers to the Bahraini security forces imposing a lockdown of the village of Eker, situated about 20 km south of the capital Manama, Bahrain.

== Background ==
On the morning of Friday, October 19, 2012, the government announced that a police officer of Pakistani origin had been killed by a homemade bomb in the village of Eker. The government released a video of the alleged bombing. Two days later, the Minister of the Interior stated that the policeman had been killed by shrapnel from an iron rod launched from a distance of 100 meters. A follow-up report issued by the government said that the policeman was hit with a "projectile" in his head. The cause of death was given as "a penetrating injury to the head causing skull fracture, damage and hemorrhage in the brain."

== The siege ==
In the wake of the alleged explosion, the government deployed police in SUVs and armored vehicles to Eker, and sealed off all routes leading to and from the village. Checkpoints were set up at various locations, and security forces carried out house raids, arresting at least 7 people, who the Ministry of Interior (Bahrain) claims may have been involved in the alleged explosion. Bahraini human rights activists stated that the raids carried out against citizens' houses are unlawful, and the arrests are arbitrary and without reasonable grounds.

A statement released by Bahrain's largest licensed opposition party, Al Wefaq described the siege as state-sponsored terrorism. The statement also said that extrajudicial raids were carried out on over forty houses in Eker, detailing property damage and harassment during the raids.

Security forces had enforced a blockade, denying entry and exit to the village for over 48 hours. Regular food deliveries were turned back, and ambulances were denied access. Within the village, police prevented residents from attending school.

Al Wefaq and other licensed opposition parties, including National Democratic Action Society (Waad), Ekhaa, Qawmy, and Wahdawy, collectively announced that they will send a joint delegation to Eker on the morning of Sunday, October 21, 2012, to try and peacefully break siege of the village. The opposition parties also planned to hold a protest that afternoon.

== See also ==
- 2011 Bahraini uprising
- Bahrain: Shouting in the dark
