= Yotam Mtayachalo =

Zambian politician

Honorable Yotam Mtayachalo

Elected member of the National Assembly
- In office August 2021 – May 2026
- Preceded by: Darious Mumba
- Succeeded by: Benson Njobvu
- Constituency: Chama North
- Incumbent
- Assumed office August 2026
- Constituency: Chama Central

Personal details
- Born: Yotam Mtayachalo; 20 October 1968 (age 57) Zambia
- Party: Patriotic Front (before 2026); NRPUP (2026 to present)

Yotam Mtayachalo is a Zambian politician and the current Member of Parliament for Chama Central constituency. He was first elected to the National Assembly for Chama North in August 2021 before being elected to the National Assembly for Chama Central in August 2026.

== Political career ==
Previously, he was a member of the Forum for Democracy and Development (FDD) where he served as Chairperson for Labour and constituency chairperson in Chama North.

A long standing trade unionist, Mtayachalo also served as national Energy Sector and Allied Workers Union (NESAWU) secretary general.

Mtayachalo has a long history of politics. He also served as Movement for Multi-Party Democracy Information and Publicity Secretary for Copperbelt Province in 2014 as well as also in the FDD.

He then joined the Patriotic Front (PF) and won the Chama North Parliamentary seat in 2021.

Ahead of the 2026 general election, Chama Central was created by taking part of Chama North and part of Chama South. Mtayachalo decided to stand for parliament in Chama Central and was adopted by the National Reconciliation Party for Unity and Prosperity. At the election on 13 August 2026, he was elected as the Chama Central member of parliament.
