= Ekar =

Ekar may refer to:

== Places ==
- Eker or Ekar, a village in Bahrain
- Cima Ekar (Ekar Peak), a mountain in Veneto, Italy
- Bandar Ekar (Ekar Port), a village and polling district in Rembau, Negeri Sembilan, Malaysia

== Other ==
- The Ekar, a 13-speed bicycle groupset manufactured by Campagnolo
- Ekar, a letter of the Assamese alphabet

== See also ==
- E-car
