= Applied Science University =

Applied Science University may refer to:

- Applied Science Private University, a university in Jordan
- Applied Science University (Bahrain), a university in Bahrain
- Applied Science University (basketball team), a basketball team in Jordan
