= Abul Aish =

Village in Bahrain

Abul Aish (Arabic: ابو العيش) is a village on the island of Sitra, Bahrain. It is located in Bahrain's Central Governorate. The Abul Aish Park is located in the village.

== Etymology ==
Abul Aish is an Arabic word that means "father of rice".
