= Applied Science University (Bahrain) =

Private university in Bahrain

Coordinates: 26.143282°N 50.614942°E

- جامعة العلوم التطبيقية
- Evening view from outside the front main entrance looking up at the clock tower of the ASU building in Sitra
- Type: Private
- Established: September 2004; 22 years ago
- Chairman: -
- President: Hatim Masri
- Students: 3,254 (2019)
- Location: Building 166 Road 23 Al Ekir 623, Capital, Bahrain
- Website: www.asu.edu.bh

The Applied Science University (ASU, جامعة العلوم التطبيقية) is a university in Al Ekir, south of Manama within the Kingdom of Bahrain.

Founded by Bahraini academic Waheeb Al-Khaja, ASU was licensed by the Ministry of Education in 2004. Gulf Education Project W.L.L. Company, based in Bahrain, owns the university. It was one of the first private universities in Bahrain to teach in both Arabic and English.

ASU publishes an open access, peer reviewed journal on risk management called Applied Science Journal under the auspices of the Institute of Risk Management.

== Academics ==
Among the programs offered by the university are eleven undergraduate programs and seven postgraduate programs. The university has colleges of administrative sciences, law, and arts and sciences.

== Campus ==
The university relocated to a new campus in September 2013. Spread out over an area of 24,400 square meters, the new campus has been built to host up to 6,300 students.

== Enrollment and faculty ==
According to a report published by the Bahraini Ministry of Education, there were 1,623 students enrolled at the time of the report's release in January 2012. In regards to university officials, there were 75 faculty members and 41 administrative staff members. Enrollment numbers increased to approximately 2,400 in 2014 and 3,254 in 2019.

University rankings

Global – Overall
- QS World: =613 (2026)

== Partnerships ==
ASU signed a memorandum of understanding with Cardiff Metropolitan University in 2014. In 2016, in a collaborative partnership between the two universities, the London South Bank University launched a new Engineering School at ASU.

== Colleges ==
- College of Administrative Sciences
- College of Law
- College of Arts and Science
- College of Engineering

== Alumni ==
- Fatema Al Harbi (born 1991 or 1992), author and peace activist
- Ali bin Majid Al-Naimi, lawyer and politician

== Faculty ==
- Hussein S. M. Zedan (1953–2019), computer scientist

== See also ==
- List of universities in Bahrain
