= Halat Um al-Baidh =

Town in the island of Sitra, Bahrain

Coordinates: 26.158°N 50.616°E

Halat Um al-Baidh (Arabic: حالة أم البيض) is a town on the island of Sitra, Bahrain. The area was inhabited by 150 people in 1905.

Today it is inhabited by 100 people, most working with tourist facilities located in the town. It is the only village on Sitra belonging to the Southern Governorate of Bahrain.
