= Wadyan =

Village on the island of Sitra, Bahrain

Coordinates: 26.158°N 50.616°E

Wadyan (Arabic: واديان) is a village on the island of Sitra, Bahrain. A branch of the National Bank of Bahrain and the Sitra police station are located in Wadyan. Also, the central market of Sitra island is located in Wadyan. In the past, this village was surrounded by a beach, on the opposite side of Al-Ekr village, before car exhibitions took the place.

== Nomenclature ==
The name of the village is derived from the Arabic word Wadi An which means Wadi of An. It was named after a famous inhabitant of the village called An.
