= 2012 Eker bombing =

Bombing of a group of Bahraini policemen in 2012

2012 Eker Bombing
- Part of the Bahraini Uprising
- Location: Eker, Bahrain
- Date: April 10, 2012
- Target: Riot police
- Attack type: Bombing
- Weapon: Pipe bomb
- Deaths: 0
- Injuries: 7
- Perpetrator: Protesters (government claim)

The 2012 Eker bombing (Arabic: تفجير العكر) occurred on 10 April 2012 in the village of Eker, in the south of the Kingdom of Bahrain. According to Ministry of Interior, the explosion injured seven policemen, three of them severely. The Ministry blamed protesters for the attack saying policemen were "lured" to the village by petrol-bomb-throwing protesters before they detonated the bomb targeting the riot police. Public security chief, General Tariq al-Hassan said the exploding device was a "pipe bomb attached to a container full of gasoline".

On the other hand, Al Wefaq, Bahrain's main opposition party, said the village was "entirely surrounded by security forces who are imposing collective punishment". They also stated that police had been firing "pellet guns" on residents who sent "calls for help".

== Reactions ==
=== Domestic ===
- A number of parliament members condemned the attack and called for "stringent measures against those who perpetrated it".
- Al Wefaq said it "condemned violence, regardless of its source".

=== International ===
- The United Nations Secretary-General Ban Ki-moon condemned the bombing on April 12 and expressed his concern over the "excessive use of force against protesters which continues to result in civilian casualties". He also appealed "to all sides to act with restraint and refrain from violence".
- (Cooperation Council for the Arab States of the Gulf) The Gulf Cooperation Council General-Secretary Dr. Abdullatif Al-Zayani condemned the "terrorist explosion" and said "those actions are perpetrated in order to cripple the process of development under the reign of HM king Hamad bin Isa Al Khalifa".
