= Mahazza =

Village on the Sitra island of Bahrain

Coordinates: 26.169°N 50.626°E

Mahazza (Arabic: مهزة, Muhazza) is a village on the Sitra island of Bahrain, in the country's Central Governorate. It is located on the eastern coast of the island. The Portuguese consulate is located in the village.
