= Marquban =

Village on Sitra Island in Bahrain

Coordinates: 26°10′N 50°37′E

Marquban (Arabic: مرقوبان) is a village on Sitra Island, in Bahrain. It is located near the center of the island. Marquban is one of Sitra's nine historic villages where most of the inhabitants of this Bahraini Persian Gulf island reside.

:
