= Chama North =

Zambian National Assembly constituency

Chama North is a constituency of the National Assembly of Zambia. It covers most of Chama and a large rural area to the north of the town in Chama District of Eastern Province.

== List of MPs ==
| Election year | MP | Party |
|---|---|---|
| 1991 | Lightwell Sibale | United National Independence Party |
| 1996 | John Phiri | Movement for Multi-Party Democracy |
| 2001 | John Chibanga | United National Independence Party |
| 2006 | Todd Chilembo | Movement for Multi-Party Democracy |
| 2011 | Darious Mumba | Movement for Multi-Party Democracy |
| 2012 (by-election) | January Zimba | Patriotic Front |
| 2016 | Darious Mumba | Patriotic Front |
| 2021 | Yotam Mtayachalo | Patriotic Front |
| 2026 | Benson Njobvu | National Reconciliation Party for Unity and Prosperity |
