= Darious Mumba =

Zambian economist and politician

Member of the National Assembly for Chama North
- In office August 2016 – August 2021
- President: Edgar Lungu
- Preceded by: January Zimba
- Succeeded by: Yotam Mtayachalo

Personal details
- Born: 12 June 1977 (age 49) Zambia
- Party: Patriotic Front
- Education: University of Greenwich, University of Zambia
- Profession: Economist, Financial expert

Darious Mumba (born 12 June 1977) is a Zambian economist, financial expert, and politician who served as the Member of Parliament for Chama North from 2016 to 2021, representing the Patriotic Front.

== Early life and education ==
Mumba was born on 12 June 1977 in Zambia. He holds a Bachelor of Arts in Business Studies (Finance) from the University of Greenwich and a Master of Arts in Economic Policy Management from the University of Zambia.

He has also obtained various professional certificates, including qualifications from the Chartered Institute of Management Accountants (CIMA), International Monetary Fund (IMF), Lusaka Securities Exchange (LuSE-SEC), Harvard University, the World Bank Group, and others.

== Political career ==
Mumba was the Movement for Multi-Party Democracy (MMD) candidate in Chama North constituency at the 2011 general election and was elected. However, after a petition, his seat was nullified the following year and a by-election took place in July 2012 in which January Zimba of the Patriotic Front (PF) was elected. Mumba then left the MMD to join the PF and was adopted as the PF's candidate in Chama North for the 2016 general election, with him winning the seat.

During his tenure, he served as a backbencher and was a member of the Committee on Media, Information, and Communication Technologies from October 2018 to May 2021.

== Constituency work ==
Mumba advocated for improved infrastructure in Chama North, urging contractors to expedite the Chibale–Chama road project to enhance connectivity for his constituents.
