= Chama District =

Coordinates: 11°15′S 32°50′E

Chama District Chamanyavyose
- District
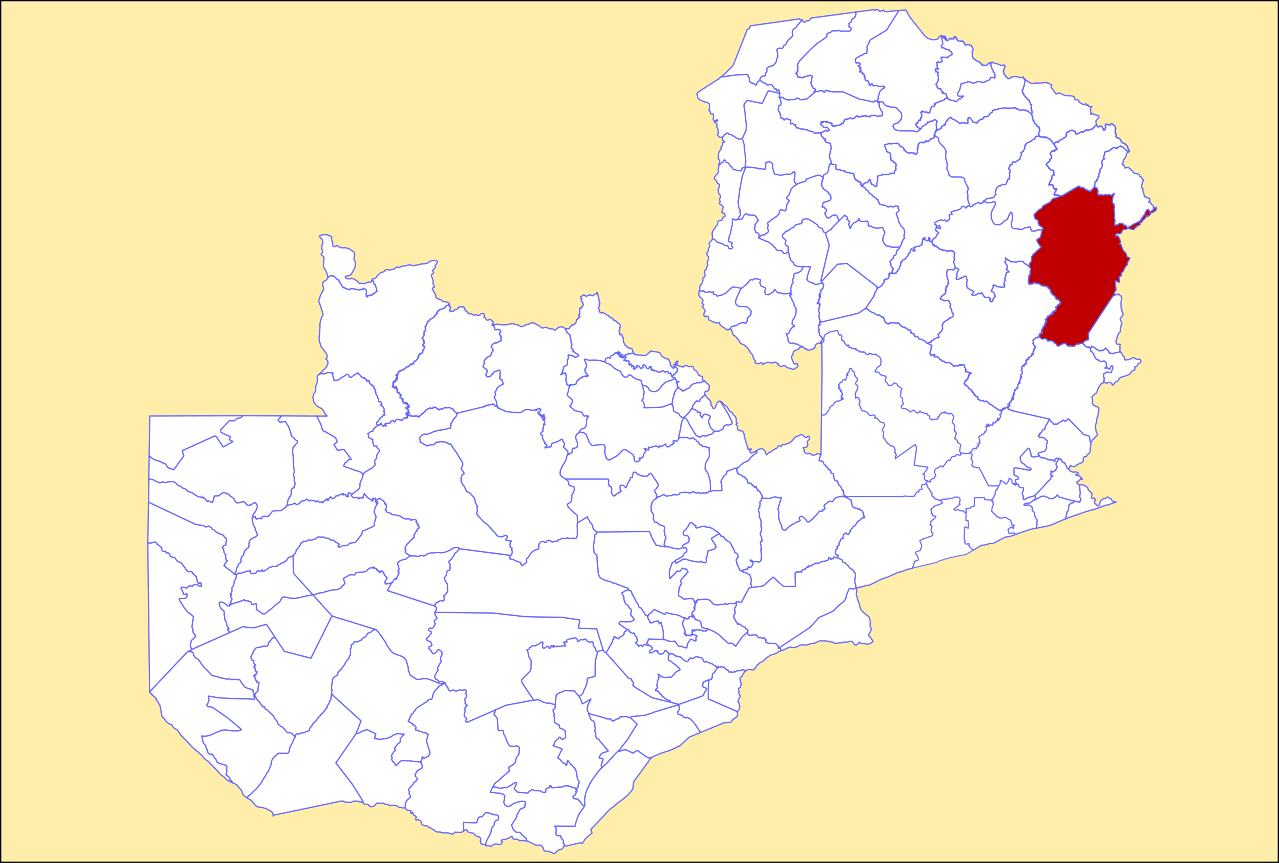
- District location in Zambia
- Country: Zambia
- Province: Eastern Province
- Capital: Chama

Area
  - Total: 17,472.8 km^{2} (6,746.3 sq mi)

Population (2022)
  - Total: 140,326
  - Density: 8.03111/km^{2} (20.8005/sq mi)
- Time zone: UTC+2 (CAT)

Chama District with the headquarters at Chama is the largest district of the Eastern Province in Zambia and includes a large wilderness in the Upper Luangwa valley just north-east of the North Luangwa National Park. It is made up of two constituencies, namely Chama North and Chama South.

Much of the population of Chama District lives close to the border with Malawi and shares tribal and cultural links with the people of the northern highlands of that country. The people of Chama belong mostly to the Tumbuka and Senga tribes which resulted as a result of intermarriage with the Tumbuka people three centuries ago. Chitumbuka is the predominant language spoken in the district.

Chama District developed from the Chamanyavyose chiefdom of the Tumbuka, established around 1470 in the Luangwa Valley. The area later experienced a major political shift around in 1780 with the arrival of Bisa-speaking groups who were later known as the Senga after they mixed with the indigenous Tumbukas, who established new chiefdom structures in parts of the region. Chama was formally separated from Lundazi District in 1967 to become an independent district in Zambia.

As of the 2022 Zambian Census, the district had a population of 140,326 people.

== History ==
=== Etymology of the name Chama ===
The name Chama originate from the Tumbuka chiefdom of Chief Chamanyavyose, who ruled the area prior to the establishment of Senga political authority. The longer name “Chamanyavyose” was gradually shortened in everyday speech to “Chama,” a term that later became associated with the chiefdom and ultimately gave its name to the present-day district. The name reflects the region’s early political geography and its association with pre-colonial Tumbuka leadership.

=== Early Tumbuka settlement in the Luangwa Valley ===
The earliest inhabitants of the area that is now Chama District were the Tumbuka people, who established settlements under the authority of Chief Chamanyavyose. These communities developed local political, social, and economic systems that governed life in the Luangwa Valley prior to the arrival of later migrant groups. The Tumbuka chiefdom of Chamanyavyose represented the dominant political structure in the region before external migration and settlement changes occurred. During the late eighteenth century, groups of Bisa migrants associated with the Mwata Yamvo Empire moved into the region and settled among the indigenous Tumbuka communities. The newcomers did not engage in large-scale warfare with the Tumbuka but gradually established their influence within the chiefdom. Over time, the Bisa came to be known locally as the Senga, and several Senga chiefdoms emerged within the territory that had previously been under the authority of Chief Chamanyavyose. As a result, political leadership in parts of the district shifted from Tumbuka rulers to Senga chiefs, who have continued to exercise traditional authority since the late eighteenth century. Despite these changes in leadership, relations between the Tumbuka and Senga have generally remained peaceful, and traditional rulers have continued to receive respect from both communities. The settlement of the Senga among the Tumbuka brought about cultural interaction. Since many of the migrants arrived with relatively few women, they intermarried extensively with local Tumbuka families. These marriages strengthened social ties between the two groups and contributed to the gradual adoption of Tumbuka cultural practices by the Senga. Over time, the Senga also adopted much of the local language and customs, while retaining elements of their own heritage. Their original language, Chi-Bisa, which is closely related to Chi-Bemba, declined in everyday use as cultural integration increased. The result was the emergence of a society in which Tumbuka and Senga traditions became closely intertwined.

=== Chamanyavyose Chiefdom before the arrival of the Bisa (c. 1470–1780) ===
==== Origin of the Chamanyavyose Kingdom ====
The Chamanyavyose chiefdom traces its origin to Nyanjagha Chamanyavyose, also known as “Chama,” a son of M’nyanjagha Longwe of the early Tumbuka royal lineage. Chamanyavyose was separated from his father before Longwe fully assumed the position of First M’nyanjagha of the wider Tumbuka political system. The separation is described as being motivated both by internal family conflict, particularly concerns over the treatment of his mother and by a search for new territory suitable for settlement. Chamanyavyose therefore left the royal centre at Kacheche with his mother and a group of supporters drawn from his clan. Chamanyavyose is described as a subordinate ruler (sub-king) under M’nyanjagha Longwe within the early Tumbuka political system. He is regarded as one of the earliest established leaders in the area corresponding to present-day Chama District, occupying the region long before the arrival of the Bisa (Senga) migrants in the late eighteenth century. On this basis, some interpretations suggest that the historical name of the district could more accurately be rendered as “Chamanyavyose District,” reflecting its pre-Senga political identity, although the current official name remains Chama District.

=== Founding of the Chamanyavyose Chiefdom ===
==== Origins and early identity of Chamanyavyose ====
The founding of the Chamanyavyose Chiefdom is traced to Nyanjagha Chamanyavyose, also known as “Chama,” a son of M’nyanjagha Longwe of the early Tumbuka royal lineage. He is described as having separated from his father before Longwe fully consolidated his position as First M’nyanjagha of the broader Tumbuka political system. Chamanyavyose is said to have left the royal centre at Kacheche with his mother and a group of supporters, motivated by internal family conflict and a desire to establish an independent settlement. The group migrated westwards across mountainous terrain and at the end reached the Nyika Plateau before descending into the Luangwa Valley. The migration marked the beginning of the establishment of a distinct political formation under Chamanyavyose leadership in the valley region.

Regnal titles
| Preceded by None | Ruler of Chamanyavyose Chiefdom c. 1470–present | Succeeded by Incumbent |
| Preceded by — | Nyanjagha Chamanyavyose c. 1470 | Succeeded by Fwasani Chasweka Musolomoka |
| Preceded by Nyanjagha Chamanyavyose | Fwasani Chasweka Musolomoka c. 1780–1800 | Succeeded by Kanabeza Musolomoka |
| Preceded by Fwasani Chasweka Musolomoka | Kanabeza Musolomoka c. 1800–? | Succeeded by Mutule |
| Preceded by Kanabeza Musolomuka | Zakaria Chidosa; 1997–present | Succeeded by Incumbent |

==== Early movements and settlement formation ====
After entering the Luangwa Valley, Chamanyavyose and his followers undertook further movements northwards into the area of Kamphumbu in present-day northern Zambia. In this region, some members of the group interacted with local leadership under Chief Katyetye. However, the group later abandoned Kamphumbu and returned to the Luangwa Valley, where they re-established their settlement permanently. The group included several clan leaders such as Mungwalala, Mungulube, Ntchuka, Chikontha, Chizembe, and Chilumanga. According to tradition, none of these groups settled west of the Luangwa River; instead, all established settlements on its eastern side. Following the crossing of the Luangwa River, different clan divisions established distinct settlement areas. The Chikontha division of the Nyimbili (Kubona) clan settled in a fertile northern valley rich in wildlife resources, forming the northernmost extent of the chiefdom. Other groups settled in the middle Luwumbu River valley, including the area known today as Sitwe, while the Ntchuka group of the Chilembo clan settled in the upper Luwumbu River region. The Chikontha and Ntchuka subchiefdoms later shared a boundary at Mphemba in present-day Muyombe.

==== The Kalinkhu River name and southern migration ====
During a subsequent phase of movement, Chamanyavyose and his group travelled southwards along a route parallel to the eastern mountains. After several days, they reached a river where they temporarily settled. Hunting activities formed part of their subsistence during this period. Oral tradition records an incident involving a dove captured by hunters and placed in a cage overnight. Despite attempts to prevent its escape, the bird fled during the night. The following morning, the group conducted a search along a nearby stream, repeatedly asking, “Where is the bird?” (Kalinkhu kayuni? in Tumbuka language). After the bird disappeared into reeds along the riverbank, the stream was thereafter named Kalinkhu River, meaning “where is it?” The event was interpreted as an ill omen, prompting the group to abandon the area and continue their migration southwards in search of a more suitable settlement location.

==== Establishment at Kamphemba (Kapemba) and territorial expansion ====
The group eventually settled at Kamphemba River (believed to be a corruption of Kapemba), where they established a permanent base on its upper reaches. The location was selected due to its reliable water sources and fertile soils. Chamanyavyose established his headquarters at this site and governed the wider chiefdom from there. At its peak, the chiefdom’s territorial influence extended westwards to the Luangwa River, eastwards toward neighbouring polities, and southwards as far as Luambe. Its influence also extended toward Mphamba, an area now within present-day Lundazi District. The Portuguese expedition to the Lunda King Kazembe in the Luapula Valley under Dr de Lacerda in 1798 also recorded the presence of Tumbuka communities east of the Luangwa River at Luambe.

=== Political authority and royal institutions ===
Chamanyavyose is remembered in oral tradition as a fair and authoritative leader, as well as an accomplished hunter of large game, particularly elephants. His praise name is recorded as Botawota Nyanjagha Musolomoka kuchanya Chibinimbi thepwele kavula mpande wanangwa ntha wovula, interpreted as a metaphorical expression of leadership authority and sacred kingship. The symbolism of “dropping from heaven” is associated with his difficult migration across mountainous terrain before settling in the Luangwa Valley. His royal seat was described as an elevated structure approximately two metres above the ground, supported by Mubanga wood poles and crowned with elephant tusks. Two attendants were stationed beneath the structure, seated in opposite directions. The throne functioned as a sacred royal chamber (Gongwe). Subjects approaching the chief were required to kneel at a distance, and even those passing nearby were expected to show respect in a similar manner. Chamanyavyose’s regalia included a leopard-skin crown and a ceremonial staff. Direct communication with the chief was not permitted; instead, interaction occurred through appointed officials such as the Prime Minister (Kazembe) and senior advisor (Yinthini).

=== Political organisation and expansion of the chiefdom (c. 1470–1500) ===
Chief Chamanyavyose governed his chiefdom through a system of subchiefs, most of whom were either his relatives or leading clan members who had accompanied him from his original settlement. These subchiefs were assigned specific territorial jurisdictions and ruled on behalf of the chief. In return, they paid annual tribute in goods and provided labour when required. They also supplied armed assistance (Bavyaka) during crises such as attacks by dangerous or man-eating animals within the chiefdom. The expanded chiefdom was divided among several subchiefs responsible for different regions. Chikontha and his assistants (Chikondo, Kawozga, and Muzambwe) governed the north-western area, while Ntchuka controlled the north-east bordering Chief Mowa. The central region was administered by Mungwalala, assisted by Mphima-Kamimbe and Mungulube. Chidundu managed territory extending northwards to the Luangwa River and shared boundaries with Chikontha, Nchuka, and Mowa. In the south, Mbachunda governed the area below the chief’s headquarters, while further southern territories were controlled by Muzgatama, Manga, Kasela, Kabanjila, and Mpamvi, who bordered Chief Mphamba in present-day Lundazi District. On the eastern side, Chamanyavyose’s brothers, Chiyunga, Chiti, Katongomala, Jalila, and Kapemba, maintained close political and familial ties with the central authority, reinforcing cohesion within the ruling structure.Chavula, Suzgo L. B. (2000). "Field interviews with Senior Chief Kambombo and headmen" (Interview). University of Zambia, School of Education. Records indicate that there were no major wars during this period, apart from later nineteenth-century conflicts associated with Bemba and Ngoni raids.

== Arrival of the Bisa and emergence of the Senga (c. 1780 onward) ==
=== Acquisition of the name Senga ===
==== Origin of the Name "Senga" ====
The people now known as the Senga were originally Bisa (Biza) migrants who entered the Chamanyavyose chiefdom around 1780 while searching for land on which to settle. During their movements through the Luangwa Valley, they encountered established Tumbuka settlements ruled by subchiefs under the authority of Chief Chamanyavyose. One of their earliest recorded encounters was with Subchief Mungwalala, whose authority and elaborate royal stool impressed the newcomers and confirmed that the territory was already occupied and politically organised. After leaving the area under Mungwalala, the Bisa migrants moved southwards to the foot of Kavuba Hill, a sacred place of worship among the local Tumbuka. There, the group held a council to determine whether to continue their journey or settle permanently. The migrants decided to proceed no further, declaring, "ta goma mu musenga uwu" ("we have stopped in these backwoods and shall go no further"). The indigenous Tumbuka subsequently referred to these newcomers as ba mu musenga ("people of the backwoods" or "people of the bush country"). Over time, this description was shortened to Senga, a name that became permanently associated with the Bisa settlers and their descendants. Their clan name, Goma, was likewise linked to their decision to stop at Kavuba Hill, deriving from the verb meaning "to stop" or "to halt". A second Tumbuka tradition offers a different explanation for the name. According to this version, the Bisa migrants were called Senga because they requested food, land, and assistance from the indigenous inhabitants. In Tumbuka, kusenga means "to ask for" or "to request", and the newcomers were therefore identified as the people who had come seeking land and support from the Tumbuka. Both traditions agree that the name Senga was not originally used by the Bisa themselves. Rather, it was a name given to them by the Tumbuka after their arrival in the Chamanyavyose chiefdom during the late eighteenth century. The term subsequently replaced their earlier ethnic designation in local usage and has remained the accepted name of the group to the present day. From approximately 1780 onwards, groups of Bisa-speaking migrants associated with the Mwata Yamvo Empire began entering the Luangwa Valley and settling among the indigenous Tumbuka communities. These migrants gradually established themselves within the territory of Chief Chamanyavyose. Oral traditions indicate that this process did not involve large-scale warfare, but rather gradual settlement and integration within the existing social environment.

Over time, the Bisa became known locally as the Senga, and new Senga chiefdoms emerged within the area formerly under Tumbuka authority. The development led to a gradual shift in political leadership in parts of the region, from Tumbuka rulers to Senga chiefs. Despite the transition, relations between the two communities remained generally peaceful, and traditional authority structures continued to be respected across both groups.

=== Historiography ===
The history of the Senga and Tumbuka peoples in Chama District has been interpreted differently by various scholars and colonial-era writers. According to historian Yizenge A. Chondoka, many early colonial officials, travelers, and researchers did not clearly distinguish between the Senga of the Luangwa Valley in present-day Chama District and the Nsenga of the Luangwa South region. Chondoka further argues that most colonial accounts relied heavily on information provided by Senga political authorities while paying little attention to Tumbuka traditions and perspectives. As a result, early historical writings often portrayed the Senga as the original inhabitants of the area without fully examining the history of the Tumbuka communities that occupied the region before the arrival of Bisa-speaking migrants. Chondoka contends that this omission influenced later scholarship, leading to limited documentation of the political and social history of the Tumbuka chiefdom of Chamanyavyose, from which the present-day district of Chama derives its name. Chondoka identifies colonial administrator Lane Edward Humphrey Poole as one of the most influential early writers on the history of the Senga. Poole served as Native Commissioner for Lundazi District between 1918 and 1924, when Chama formed part of the larger Lundazi administrative district. Through oral interviews conducted primarily among Senga communities, Poole compiled one of the earliest published histories of the Senga. His work, The Native Tribes of the Eastern Province of Northern Rhodesia (Notes on their Migrations and History), was first published in 1933 and later revised in 1936.Poole 1933, pp. 1–15; Poole 1936, pp. 1–15 According to Chondoka, Poole's writings became highly influential and shaped subsequent interpretations of Senga history. He argues that later scholars relied heavily on these early colonial accounts, contributing to the persistence of narratives that focused on Senga political history while giving comparatively little attention to the earlier history of the Tumbuka communities of the Luangwa Valley.

== Geography ==
In 2012, President Michael Sata created a new province in Zambia, namely Muchinga Province. Chama District was taken from Eastern Province and included in Muchinga Province.

Nine years later, on 17 November 2021, President Hakainde Hichilema announced his intention to reverse the decision to move Chama District from Eastern Province. President Hichilema officially declared Chama District as part of Eastern Province (no-longer part of Muchinga Province), thereby returning the district to its original province.

As of 2010, Chama District's two constituencies consisted of 22 wards. In April 2026, the number of constituencies in Chama District increased to three (Chama North, Chama Central and Chama South) with the amount of wards standing at 24.

== Sources ==
- Chondoka, Yizenge A. (2007). A History of the Tumbuka and Senga in Chama District, Zambia, 1470–1900. Lusaka: Academic Press. ISBN 978-9982-50-004-3.
- Poole, Lane Edward Humphrey (1933). The Native Tribes of the Eastern Province of Northern Rhodesia.
- Kabanda (1990). "Oral Interview at Chama Boma" (Interview).
