= Sufala =

Village on the Sitra island of Bahrain

Coordinates: 26°10′N 50°38′E

Sufala (Arabic: سفالة، Sfala) is a village on the Sitra island of Bahrain. The village is located on the eastern coast of the island, and is part of the Central Governorate.
