= SBS Swiss Business School =

Business school in Zurich, Switzerland

- Type: University of Applied Science Institute
- Established: 1998; 28 years ago
- Accreditation: SAC/BAC/ACBSP/IACBE/CHEA
- Affiliations: see Partner institutions
- President: Dr. Frank Waltmann
- Dean: Prof. Marijana Karanfiloska (Dean of Administration and Finance & Co-Owner), Prof. Dr. Bert Wolfs, Ph.D. (Academic Dean)
- Faculty: 125
- Students: 3000 (2026)
- Location: Zurich, Switzerland; 47.45344°N 8.579937°E
- Website: www.sbs.edu

SBS Swiss Business School is a private business school located in Zurich, Switzerland, with affiliated campuses and partner schools in Malta, China, Spain, Latvia, Kazakhstan, the United Arab Emirates, India, Myanmar, Ghana, Qatar and the United States. The school offers undergraduate, graduate, and doctoral programs in business administration, management, marketing, artificial intelligence (AI), and executive education certificate programs.

SBS Swiss Business School is accredited by the Swiss Accreditation Council in accordance with the Swiss Higher Education Act. Additionally, it is accredited by BAC, ACBSP, IACBE, and other recognized bodies. Its programs are designed to provide a global perspective, practical skills, and leadership development for ambitious professionals. The school emphasizes a practical, andragogical learning approach as well as international diversity, with students and faculty from over 60 countries.

== History ==
SBS Swiss Business School was founded in 1998 as a private educational institution.

== Academic programs ==
SBS Swiss Business School offers undergraduate, graduate, and doctoral programs in business and management. Programs are delivered in English and include on-campus, online, and hybrid formats.

=== Undergraduate programs ===
At the undergraduate level, SBS offers a Bachelor of Science in Business Administration (BSc) in Zurich and Bachelor in Business Administration (BBA) degree abroad.

=== Graduate programs ===
Graduate programs offered by SBS Swiss Business School at the Zurich campus include full-time and online Master of Science (MSc) programs with specializations. The full-time program is in International Business, while the online programs offer specializations in Digital Marketing, Artificial Intelligence and Business, and Business Analytics. Additionally, SBS offers full-time and online MSc programs abroad with specializations in Healthcare Management and Arts and Cultural Management.

The school also offers Master of Business Administration (MBA) programs in several formats, including part-time and online programs at the Zurich campus, such as the MBA, Executive MBA (EMBA), and Online MBA (OMBA). In addition, partner schools and affiliated campuses deliver various MBA programs in part-time and online formats, including the Global MBA, EMBA, and MBA.

=== Doctoral programs ===
At the doctoral level, SBS offers the Doctor of Business Administration (DBA), including a specialized DBA in Strategy, Project Leadership and PMO Management.The DBA program is delivered in a part-time format.

=== Executive Education ===
SBS Swiss Business School offers executive education through short courses, certificate courses, professional programs, and customized corporate training. These programs are delivered on campus in Zurich campus and online formats.

== Accreditation status ==
SBS Swiss Business School has received institutional accreditation in accordance with the Swiss Higher Education Act (HEdA).

The Swiss Accreditation Council has accredited SBS as a University of Applied Sciences Institute after a comprehensive quality assessment process conducted by the Agency for Accreditation and Quality Assurance (AAQ).

SBS Swiss Business School is additionally accredited by the British Accreditation Council (BAC), and professionally accredited by Association of Collegiate Business Schools and Programs (ACBSP) as well as the International Assembly for Collegiate Business Education (IACBE). IACBE and ACBSP are U.S. based accreditation bodies that are accredited by the Council for Higher Education Accreditation (CHEA), a recognized accrediting organization that is recognized by the U.S Department of Education.

SBS Swiss Business School is listed as recognized by the Chinese Ministry of Education through the Chinese Service Center for Scholarly Exchange (CSCSE) for its business programs.

== Memberships ==
SBS Swiss Business School is a member of the Association to Advance Collegiate Schools of Business (AACSB International), the Swiss Adult Education Association (SVEB), the Swiss Federation of Private Schools (VSP), and the Swiss Private School Register

SBS Swiss Business School is a member of the Council of International Schools (CIS), an organization that accredits and supports international education institutions.

SBS Swiss Business School is listed in the World Higher Education Database (WHED), maintained by the International Association of Universities in collaboration with UNESCO.

SBS Swiss Business School is listed on the Swiss Private School Register (SFPS), which includes private schools in Switzerland.

SBS Swiss Business School is listed in the Swiss Private School Register (SPSR), which includes private educational institutions in Switzerland.

SBS Swiss Business School is a founding member of ASIPES/SAPIHE, an association of private higher education institutions in Switzerland.

SBS Swiss Business School is listed as a member of Swiss Label, an association that certifies Swiss-origin products and services.

SBS Swiss Business School is an approved institution of the United States Department of Veterans Affairs, allowing eligible members of the U.S. Armed Forces and their dependents to access education benefits.

== Rankings ==
SBS Swiss Business School has appeared in several international rankings of business schools and graduate management programs.

Since 2012, the school's MBA programs have been listed in the CEO Magazine Global MBA Rankings, where SBS has been classified among Tier One MBA providers.

In the 2021 edition of the CEO Magazine Global MBA Rankings, SBS Swiss Business School's Online MBA and Executive MBA programs were ranked among the top programs globally, and the school's Doctor of Business Administration (DBA) program was listed among internationally recognized DBA programs.

In the 2025 CEO Magazine Global MBA Rankings, the Executive MBA program at SBS Swiss Business School was ranked 5th globally and the Online MBA program was ranked 6th worldwide. The institution was also listed as a Tier One Global MBA provider, and its Doctor of Business Administration (DBA) program was included among globally recognized DBA programs.

In the 2026 CEO Magazine Global MBA Rankings, the Executive MBA program at SBS Swiss Business School was ranked 4th globally, and the Online MBA program was ranked 5th worldwide. The institution was also listed as a Tier One Global MBA provider, and its Doctor of Business Administration (DBA) program was recognized among globally ranked DBA programs.

SBS Swiss Business School has also appeared in the Times Higher Education Impact Rankings, which assess universities worldwide against the United Nations Sustainable Development Goals (SDGs). The institution has been included in several editions of the ranking, including 2021, 2024 and 2025.

The school was listed in the 2025 QS Online MBA Rankings, which evaluate online MBA programs worldwide.

SBS Swiss Business School was ranked 29th in the QS Online MBA Rankings 2026: Europe, Middle East & Africa.

In 2025, SBS Swiss Business School was recognized in the SDG Accord Annual Report as the only institutional signatory from Switzerland.

In addition, the Doctor of Business Administration (DBA) program at SBS Swiss Business School has been included in international DBA program listings.

== Partner institutions ==
SBS Swiss Business School has affiliated academic partnerships with the following academic institutions worldwide:

- ATMS Education Group / Al Tareeqah Management Studies, U.A.E,
- SBS Swiss Business School RAK Campus, U.A.E.,
- SBS Swiss Business School China Center, China,
- SBS Swiss Business School Barcelona and Madrid Campus, Spain,
- SBS Swiss Business School, Malta,
- MIBA College, Myanmar,
- Ningo University of Finance and Economics, China,
- BA School of Business and Finance, Riga, Latvia,
- EurAsia Business School, Almaty, Kazakhstan,
- IILM Institute of Higher Education, New Delhi, India,
- Nobel International Business School (NiBS), Accra, Ghana,
- University of North Carolina at Wilmington (UNCW), USA,
- Meiric Training & Consulting, Dubai, U.A.E.
- Qatar Finance and Business Academy (QFBA)

== Notable alumni ==
- Randy Abbey, Ghanaian media personality and sports administrator.
- Fatema Al Harbi (born 1991 or 1992), Bahraini author and peace activist
