= Al Kharijiya =

Village in Bahrain

Al-Kharijiya (Arabic: الخارجية) is the largest village on the Sitra island of Bahrain. It is located near the eastern coast of the island, in the Persian Gulf.
