= Davison Mung'andu =

Zambian politician

Member of the National Assembly for Chama South
- In office August 2016 – May 2026
- Preceded by: Effron Lungu
- Succeeded by: Jerrix Nkhata

Personal details
- Born: 19 June 1981 (age 45) Zambia
- Party: Patriotic Front (2016 - 2026)
- Profession: Land economics consultant, politician

Davison Mung'andu is a Zambian politician who served as the Member of the National Assembly for Chama South from 2016 to 2026, representing the Patriotic Front (PF).

== Political career ==
Mung'andu was first elected as the Chama South MP in the 2016 general election as the Patriotic Front candidate. At the 2021 general election, he was re-elected.
