= Chama (surname) =

Chama is a surname of Zambian origin that may refer to:

- Adrian Chama (born 1989), Zambian footballer
- Albert Chama, Zambian Anglican bishop
- Bronson Chama (born 1986), Zambian footballer
- Clatous Chama (born 1991), Zambian footballer
- Davies Chama (born 1964), Zambian politician
- Dick Chama (1946–2006), Zambian footballer and coach
- Enock Chama, Zambian boxer
- Noel Chama (born 1997), Mexican racewalking athlete
