= Ma'ameer =

- Village
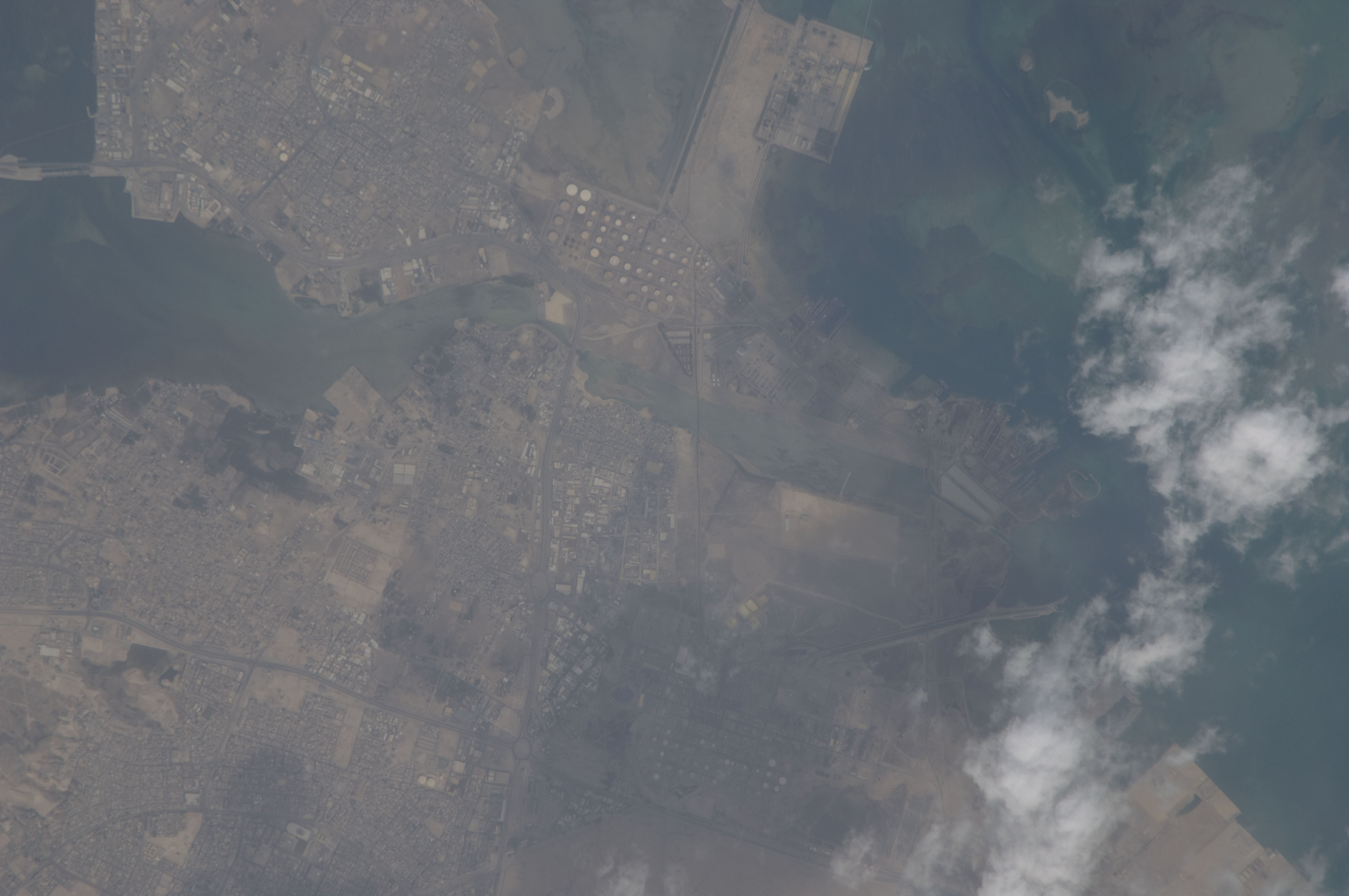
- Nickname: Princess Ma'ameer المعامير الأميرة; Al-Ma'ameer Al-Ameera
- Location in Bahrain
- Coordinates: 26°8′3″N 50°36′47″E
- Country: Bahrain
- Established: 18th century
- Demonym: Ma'ameeri

Ma'ameer (Arabic: المعامير) is a village in Bahrain. Nationally, the village is known for its Industrial Area, which consists of the Bahrain Petroleum Company (BAPCO) refinery and a large number of factories, production units such as Awal Ready-mixed Concrete (ARMCON), Eastern Asphalt, Gulf Petrochemical Industrial Corp (GPIC), Aluminium Bahrain and Al Zamil Aluminium. Villagers have long complained of health problems as a result of pollution from the Industrial Area.

== History ==
=== Ma'ameer during the 2011-2012 uprising ===
Since the start of the 2011-2012 Bahraini uprising, unrest became more common in villages containing large Shia population, including Ma'ameer. Clashes between security forces and anti-government rioters and vandals continued throughout the uprising, with riot police often being attacked by Molotov cocktails and blunt weapons. At least two people from the village died during the uprising.

== Pollution ==
Villagers in Ma'ameer have long complained of air and sea pollution as a result of the factories present in the Industrial Area. Villagers allege that emissions from the factories in the form of fumes, smoke and gases with strong smells, have led to a spike in the number of long-term illnesses emerging in the village, and had also led to the death of several people in the village over the past years. They also allege that the discharge of waste from ALBA and GPIC factories into the sea, off the village's coast, has caused pollution, killing off aquatic life.

Villagers have formed the Ma'ameer Environmentalist Committee (MEC) which actively campaigns, both in Bahrain and abroad, for greater pollution controls in the village and the country. The MEC regularly calls upon the Commission for the Protection of Marine Resources, Environment and Wildlife, which is responsible for the environment in the country, to take action over the pollution. In 2006, Bahrain's lower house of parliament ruled that BAPCO had to pay compensation to villagers who had skin allergy, cancer, miscarriages or other environment-related diseases. Parliament also ordered BAPCO to finance awareness campaigns and studies in the village.

== See also ==
- Nuwaidrat
- Sitra
