= Yizenge Chondoka =

Zambian academic, author, and cultural researcher

- Born: October 6, 1950 (age 75); Lundazi, Northern Rhodesia (now Zambia)
- Education: University of Zambia (BA, MA), Michigan State University (PhD)
- Occupations: Academic, author, researcher
- Employer: University of Zambia
- Known for: Research on African culture, oral traditions, and marriage customs
- Notable work: Traditional Marriages in Zambia, A History of the Tumbuka from 1400 to 1900, The Zwangendaba Mpezeni Ngoni

Yizenge Chondoka (born 6 October 1950) is a Zambian academic, author, and cultural researcher known for his work on African traditional societies, customs, and oral history. He was a professor of sociology at the University of Zambia and had published several books on Zambian culture and traditions.

== Early life and education ==
Chondoka was born in Lundazi District, then part of Northern Rhodesia, to Tumbuka parents. He attended local mission schools before enrolling at the University of Zambia where he obtained a Bachelor of Arts degree and later a Master’s degree in sociology. He later pursued doctoral studies at Michigan State University in the United States, specializing in cultural anthropology and sociology.

== Academic career ==
Chondoka spent much of his academic career teaching and conducting research at the University of Zambia. His work focused on cultural preservation, traditional marriage systems, initiation ceremonies, and the changing role of family structures in Zambian society.

His publications, which include Traditional Marriages in Zambia and A History of the Tumbuka from 1400 to 1900, have been widely cited in African studies and sociology research. Chondoka has also contributed numerous articles to journals and presented papers at international conferences on African culture and social change.

== Research and writing ==
Through his books and fieldwork, Chondoka had documented traditional practices among several Zambian ethnic groups, including the Tumbuka, Ngoni, and Bemba. His research states the importance of oral tradition in preserving community identity and transmitting indigenous knowledge.

He was also an advocate for the integration of African cultural education into modern school systems and had served as a consultant for cultural research projects in Zambia and abroad.

== Selected works ==
- Traditional Marriages in Zambia: A Study in Cultural History. Ndola: Mission Press, 1988.
- A History of the Tumbuka from 1400 to 1900: The Tumbuka under the M’nyanjagha, Chewa, Balowoka, Senga, and Ngoni Chiefs. Xlibris / Academic Press, 2007.
- History of the Tumbuka & Senga in Chama District: 1470 to 1900 (Chiefdoms Without a Kingdom). Academic Press, 2007.
- The Zwangendaba Mpezeni Ngoni: History and Migrations, Settlements and Culture. Lusaka: Academic Press, 2017.
- The Federation of Rhodesia and Nyasaland, 1953–1963. Lusaka: University of Zambia, Department of History, 1985.
- A Short Guide to Library Research: Footnotes and Bibliography for Students at the University of Zambia. Lusaka: University of Zambia, c.1980s.

He has also authored numerous academic papers and conference presentations on cultural continuity, oral history, and traditional governance systems in Zambia.

== Legacy ==
Chondoka is regarded as one of Zambia’s leading authorities on indigenous knowledge systems and traditional culture. His work continues to influence young scholars and cultural activists across southern Africa.

== See also ==
- Culture of Zambia
- Tumbuka people
