= Chama South =

Constituency of the National Assembly of Zambia

Chama South is a constituency of the National Assembly of Zambia. It covers the southern part of Chama as well as the towns of Chankalamu, Chipondo, Chisondi, Chitimbe, Msitu and Mwami in Chama District of Eastern Province.

== List of MPs ==
Election year	MP	Party
1991	Cuthbert Ng'uni	United National Independence Party
1996	Yotam Ngulube	Movement for Multi-Party Democracy
2001	John Ng'uni	United National Independence Party
2006	Bornface Nkhata	Movement for Multi-Party Democracy
2011	Effron Lungu	Patriotic Front
2016	Davison Mung'andu	Patriotic Front
2021	Davison Mung'andu	Patriotic Front
2026	Jerrix Nkhata	Independent
