= Omar Al Busaidy =

Emirati businessman and writer

- Born: 1986 (age 39–40); Dubai, United Arab Emirates
- Education: American University in Dubai (BA); Florida State University (MA)
- Occupations: Businessman, writer, radio host
- Known for: Founder of Global Possibilities Consulting
- Notable work: Just Read It (2015)
- Awards: Fulbright scholarship

Omar Al Busaidy (born 1986) is an Emirati businessman and writer. He is the author of book, Just Read It, and is the founder of Global Possibilities Consulting.

== Early life and education ==
Al Busaidy was born in Dubai, United Arab Emirates. From an early age, he was interested in writing poetry.

Al Busaidy obtained a bachelor's degree from the American University in Dubai and a master's degree in international affairs and intelligence from Florida State University as a Fulbright scholar.

== Career ==
During his career, he has held positions at Emirates NBD, the British Embassy - UAE, Dubai Chamber, Department of Municipalities and Transport - Abu Dhabi, the Department of Culture and Tourism in Abu Dhabi, and worked as a producer and radio host for Pulse 95 Radio.

Al Busaidy is a non-resident fellow at Trends Research & Advisory, a think tank in the UAE. Al Busaidy was previously a Global Shaper, an initiative of the World Economic Forum, and has participated in the U.S. State Department's International Visitor Leadership Program (IVLP).

In 2015, his book, Just Read It, was published which has been translated into multiple languages including Arabic and Persian.

In 2022, Al Busaidy was also featured in Innovation to the Core: Stories from China and the World and co-authored Agile Government: Emerging Perspectives in Public Management.

Starting in 2018, Al Busaidy hosted The Morning Majlis with Sally Mousa and Sara Al Madani. Due to the success of the show, Al Busaidy later started his own radio show, Future Talk, in which he discusses the concept of futurism across a variety of global sectors.

== Bibliography ==
- Just Read It (2015)
