= Ebrahim Bashmi =

Bahraini politician, novelist, journalist and nonfiction writer

- Born: 1947 (age 78–79); Bahrain
- Occupations: Writer, Journalist, Politician
- Known for: Contributions to Bahraini media and literature

Ebrahim Bashmi (Arabic: إبراهيم بشمي, born 1947 (age 78–79)) is a Bahraini politician, novelist, journalist, and nonfiction writer.

== Biography ==
Bashmi was born in Manama. He obtained a Bachelor of Arts in journalism from Cairo University in 1971. He then worked for several publications: journalist for Bahraini newspaper Al-Adwaa from 1971 to 1973, editor-in-chief of Al-Osboa from 1975 to 1980, director of the Bahrain office for the Emirati newspaper Al Khaleej from 1980 to 1982, and deputy director of the United Nations Information Centre in Bahrain from 1982 to 1983. Most notably, he served as editor-in-chief of the Al Khaleej’s Panorama magazine from 1983 to 2003. He chaired the editorial board of Al-Waqt from 2005 to 2010. He was appointed to the Shura Council, the nation’s upper house, from 2002 to 2014.

== Works ==
1. اليمن بوابة الخليج الخلفية (“Yemen:Gateway to the Gulf,” 1982)
2. الكويت فرز الأوراق الديمقراطية (“Elections in Kuwait,” 1982)
3. بلوشستان قوس الخليج المشدود (“Balochistan: The Narrow Arch of the Gulf,” 1985)
4. أيام زمان (“The Old Days,” 1986)
5. حكايات شعبية (“Folk Tales,” 1986)
6. بيوت البحرين القديمة (“Old Houses of Bahrain,” 1987)
7. أرخبيل الحكايات (“Tales of the Archipelago,” 1988)
8. مملكة هرمز .. الفقاعة الذهبية (“Kingdom of Ormus: The Golden Bubble,” 1994)
9. منمنمات (“Miniatures,” 1994)
10. حكايات الأمثال (“Tales of Proverbs,” 1994)
11. الحكواتي الشرقي (Eastern Storytellers“,” 1994)
12. عقد اللآل في تاريخ أوال (“History of Allah in Awal,” 1994)
13. المنامة شانزيليزيه الخليج (“Manama: The Champs-Élysées of the Gulf,” 1994)
14. ليس للعشق من يقين (“Love Has No Certainty,” 1998)
15. (واطرفتاه – (حياة الشاعر طرفة بن العبد (“And His Immoderation: The Life of Tarafa ibn al-Abd,” 1998)
16. قوس الخليج المشدود (“The Narrow Arch of the Gulf,” 1998)
17. (خليج السبعينات (رواية شاهد عيان (“The Gulf in the 1970’s: An Eyewitness Novel,” 2002)
18. هواجس البحرين الديمقراطية (“Issues in Bahrain’s Democracy,” 2002)
19. إشكالية غياب الثقافة الديمقراطية (“Problems with the Lack of a Democratic Culture,” 2002)
