= Ibrahim Fahad Al Naimi =

Free Syrian Army officer

- Born: Syria
- Military career
- Allegiance: Ba'athist Syria (until 2011) Syrian Arab Republic (Since 2025) Syrian opposition (Syrian National Council)
- Branch: Free Syrian Army; Syrian Army (since 2025); Army of Free Tribes (until 2025)
- Rank: Brigadier General
- Unit: Southern Command (until 2025)
- Conflicts: Syrian civil war

Ibrahim Fahad Al Naimi is a Free Syrian Army brigadier general, who defected from the Syrian Army to the FSA. He founded the clan-based Southern Command on 5 September 2014 in Quneitra Governorate.
