= Huda al-Naimi =

Qatari writer and academic

Dr Huda Mohamed al-Naimi
- Citizenship: Qatar
- Education: University of Cairo
- Occupation: Director of Safety
- Employer: Hamad Medical Corporation
- Honours: President of the Qatar Medical Physics Society

Huda al-Naimi (Arabic: هدى النعيمي) is a medical physicist and writer from Qatar.

== Biography ==
Al-Naimi grew up a small town near Doha and studied physics at the University of Qatar. She moved to Cairo in 1990 in order to study for a master's degree in Nuclear Physics at Ain Shams University. She continued her education and was awarded a doctorate from the University of Cairo in Medical Physics.

=== Career ===
In 2000, al-Naimi moved back to Qatar and took up a post as Director of Safety for the Hamad Medical Corporation (HMC). As part of her role at HMC, al-Naimi leads on their MENA-regional training on radiation safety. She has represented Qatar at a number of international meetings and conferences concerning radiation safety, including those led by the International Atomic Energy Agency and the United Nations Environment Programme. In 2013 she was President of the Qatar Medical Physics Society.

=== Arts and literature ===
In addition to al-Naimi's studies, during her time studying in Cairo, she began to write creatively and published three books of short stories whilst living there. One of her stories, Layla & Me, is a Qatari telling of the Red Riding Hood story - in it the protagonist is as dark as the wolf. Her collection Abatil is seen as a key text in modern Qatari writing.

After moving back to Qatar, al-Naimi has been active in the cultural sector as a member for the National Council for Culture in Qatar and part of the organisational team for Doha: Arabic Capital of Culture 2010. She is active in literary circles and in 2011 was guest of honour at the Sudanese Book Fair in Khartoum. In 2012, she was one of the judges for the International Prize for Arabic Fiction, alongside translator Gonzalo Fernández Parilla, originally from Spain, and from Lebanon the critic Maudie Bitar. During this year of the prize, al-Naimi praised the number of women on the judging panel, but was concerned that less than 15% of the entrants were women.

== Awards ==
- 2015/16 - Recognition & Encouragement Award: Medical & Nursing was jointly awarded to Dr Huda al-Naimi and Dr Asma Ali Jassim al-Thani.
