= Sitra =

Island in Bahrain

Native name: سترة
- Location within Bahrain

Geography
- Location: Persian Gulf
- Coordinates: 26.152°N 50.623°E
- Archipelago: Bahrain
- Adjacent to: Persian Gulf
- Total islands: 1
- Major islands: Sitra
- Area: 22.45 km^{2} (8.67 sq mi)
- Length: 8.3 km (5.16 mi)
- Width: 5 km (3.1 mi)
- Coastline: 36 km (22.4 mi)
- Highest elevation: 6 m (20 ft)

Administration
- Bahrain
- Governorate: split between Capital Governorate and Southern Governorate
- Largest settlement: Marquban (pop. 20,000)

Demographics
- Demonym: Bahraini
- Population: 72,601 (2012)
- Pop. density: 3,608/km^{2} (9345/sq mi)
- Ethnic groups: Bahraini, non-Bahraini

Additional information
- Time zone: AST (UTC+3)
- ISO code: BH-14

Sitra (Arabic: سترة or سِتْرَة, As-Sitra), also known as Sitrah or Sitra Island (Arabic: جزيرة سترة Jazīrat Sitrah), is an island in Bahrain situated approximately 5 km (3.1 mi) south of the capital, Manama, which is on Bahrain Island.

== History ==
The island of Sitra has witnessed various conflicts. One notable conflict occurred in 1782 between the local populace and a group of Bani Utbah individuals who arrived in Sitra from Zubarah seeking supplies. This confrontation resulted in casualties on both sides and led to the 1783 Bani Utbah invasion of Bahrain, which in turn led to the end of Persian rule in Bahrain.

The first oil infrastructure was built in 1934 by the Bahrain Petroleum Company, including a draw bridge connecting Sitra to the main island.

=== Arab Spring ===
During the Arab Spring in Bahrain, Sitra played a prominent role as a site of significant protests. The island became a focal point for demonstrations, with numerous citizens gathering to express their grievances. The events during this period led to widespread unrest, injuries, and fatalities among the protesters, marking a critical chapter in the island's contemporary history.

== Geography ==
Situated to the east of Bahrain Island in the Persian Gulf, Sitra is positioned south of Manama and Nabih Saleh. Its western coastline serves as the boundary for Tubli Bay. Historically, the island was characterized by date-palm groves and agricultural land with several freshwater springs. However, rapid urbanization and development have significantly transformed the island's landscape.

== Demography ==
Most of the inhabitants of the island live in nine historic villages:

- Wadyan
- Al Kharijiya
- Marquban
- Al Garrya
- Mahazza
- Sufala
- Abul Aish
- Halat Um al-Baidh (the location of the yacht club and Al Bandar resort)
- Al Hamriya

A massive land reclamation project off the eastern coast of the island called East Sitra City increased the island size by 50% and became the site of a new city.

== Economy ==
The island's economy used to be based on agriculture and fishing. The northern section of the island has been turned into an industrial area. Bapco oil storage reservoirs are located in the south. Sitra is also the terminus of the 42-km Dhahran-Sitra natural gas pipeline, which connects it to Dahran in Saudi Arabia.

Several car and furniture showrooms also make up the new development on the island. The Sitra Club is a cultural and sports club for the island.

Today Sitra handles Bahrain's entire petroleum production. It is the location of Port of Sitra. It is also the export center for the oil fields in northeastern Saudi Arabia.

== Education ==
Sitra is the site of many school campuses such as Al Noor International School and Indian School, Bahrain. The Applied Science University is also located here.

== Transportation ==
The Sitra Causeway connects the north of the island to Nabih Saleh and to Umm al Hussam (Manama) on Bahrain Island. Two small bridges on the south west of Sitra also join Bahrain Island, near the villages of Ma'ameer and Eker.

== Administration ==
The southern part of the island belongs to Southern Governorate and the northern part to Capital Governorate. Between 1990 and 2013 it was part of Central Governorate of Bahrain, but that has since been dissolved. Between 1920 and 1990 it was part of Sitra Municipality.

=== Sitra Municipality ===
This was a municipality in Bahrain before they were re-organized as Governorates. The Sitra Municipality consisted of the island of Sitra and three villages close to it on the main island of Bahrain: Ma'ameer, Eker and Nuwaidrat.

== Image gallery ==
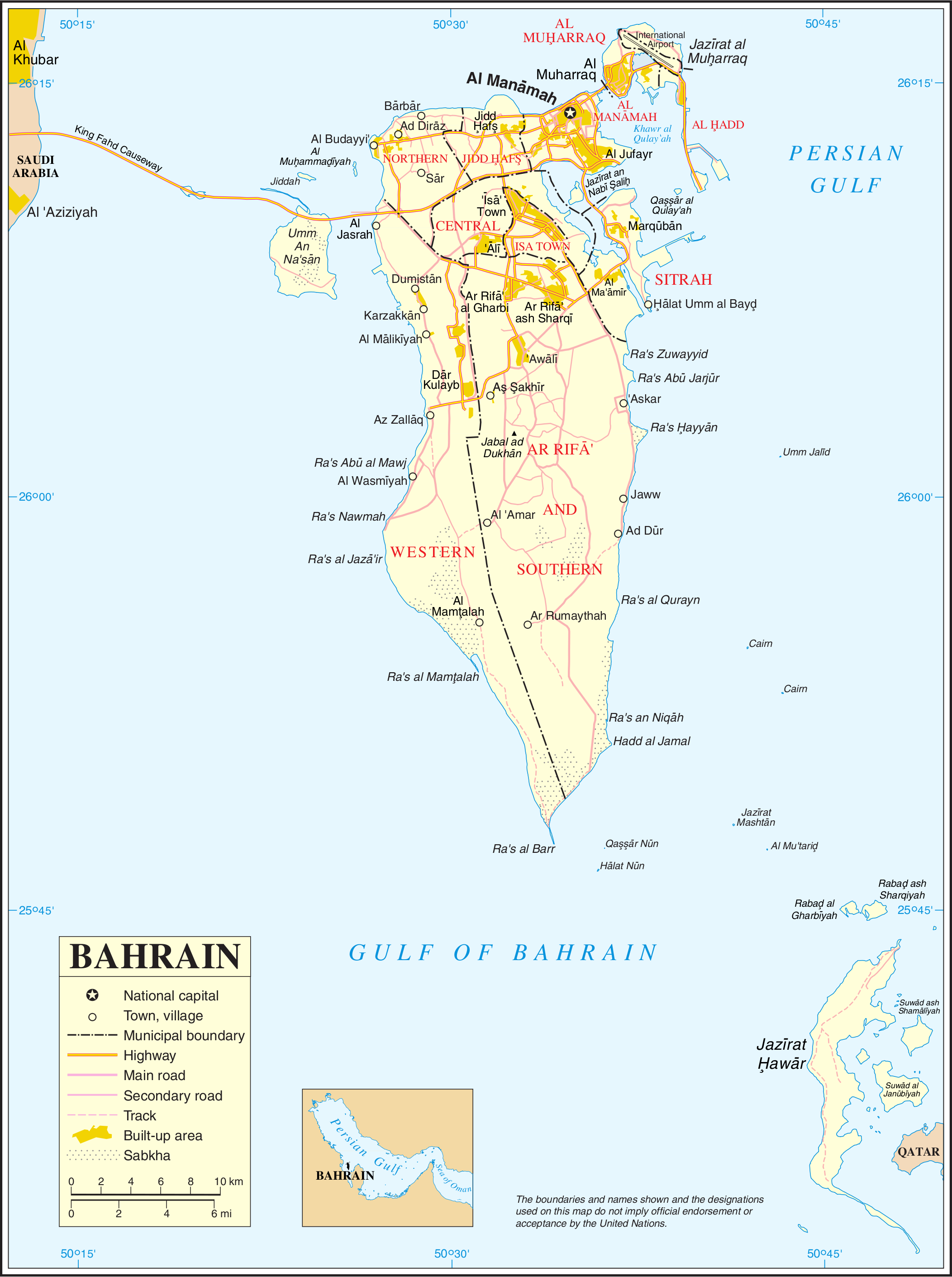
Map 1

Map Districts

District Map

District Map

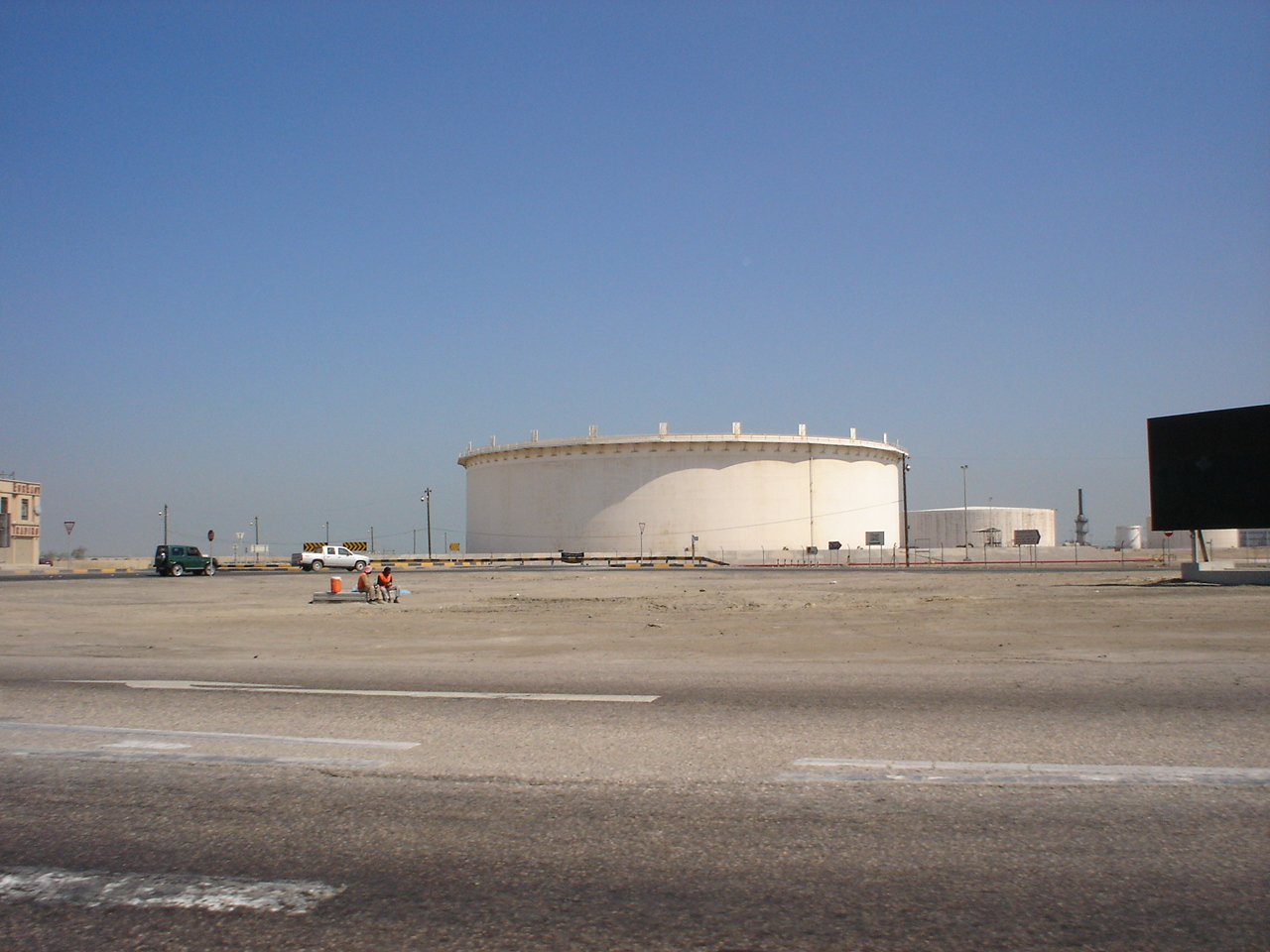
Bapco Bahrain oil reservoirs in Sitra

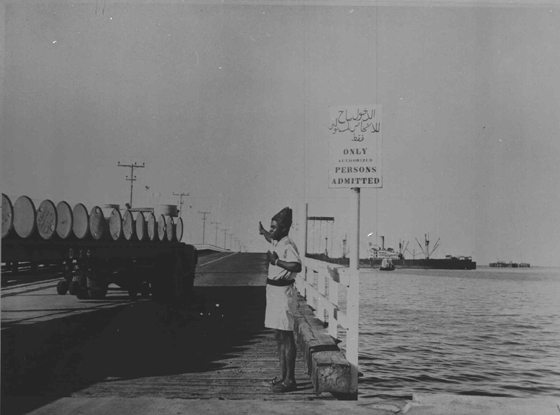
Berth number 4 in Sitra Wharf in 1940

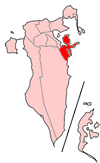
Map of Bahrain showing Sitrah municipality

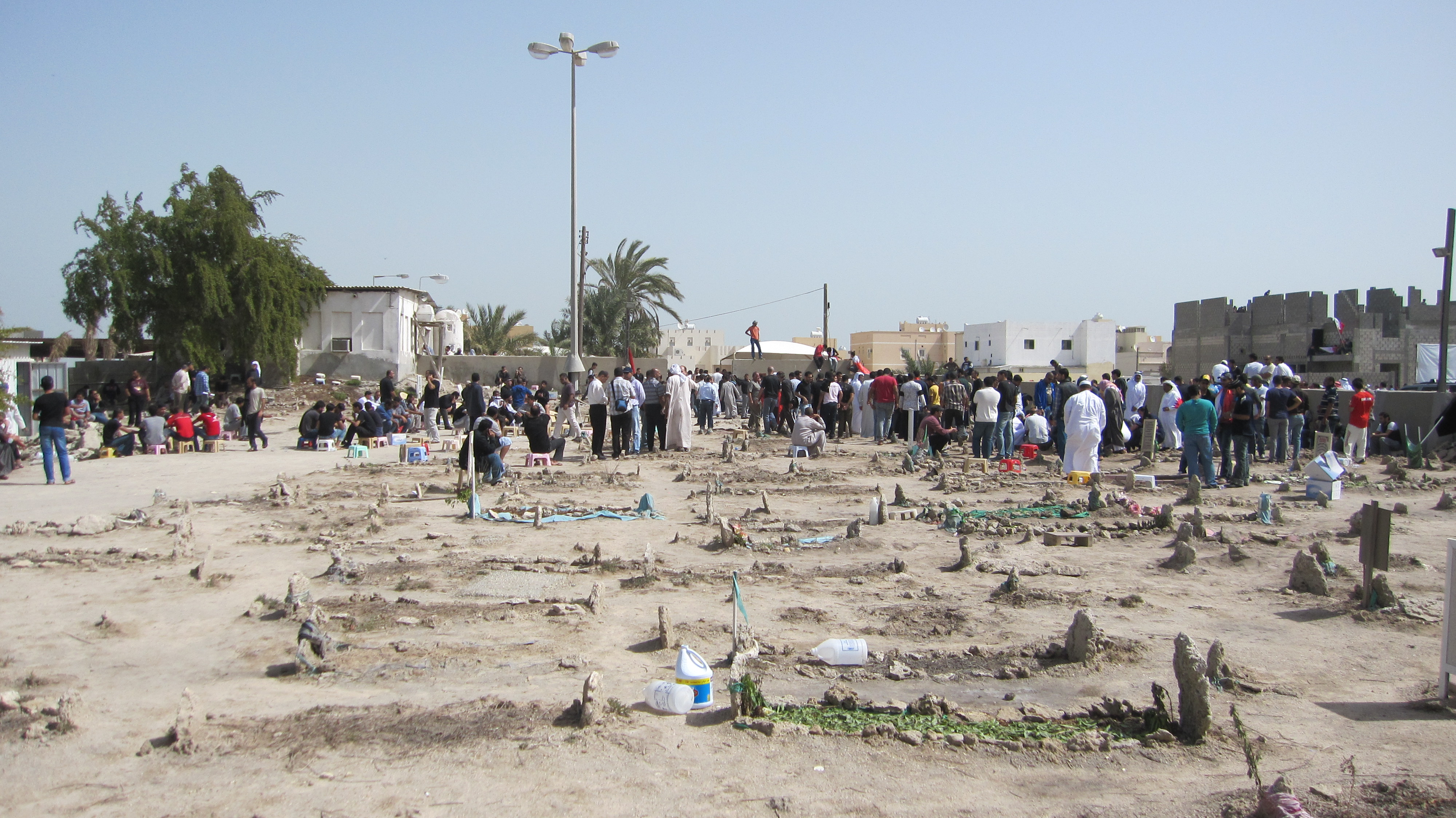
Cemetery

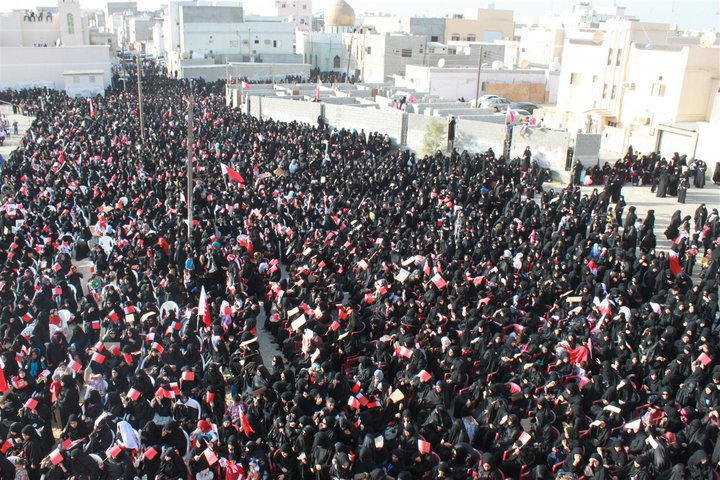
Women taking part in a pro-democracy sit-in in Sitra

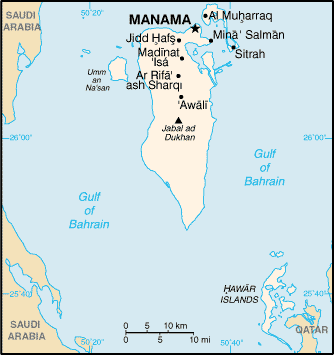
Sitra (Sitrah), east of Manama, in Bahrain

== See also ==
- List of islands of Bahrain
