= Ali bin Majid Al-Naimi =

Bahraini lawyer and politician

- علي ماجد النعيمي

Member of the Council of Representatives (Bahrain)
- Incumbent
- Assumed office 2018
- Monarch: Hamad bin Isa Al Khalifa
- Prime Minister: Khalifa bin Salman Al Khalifa, Salman, Crown Prince of Bahrain
- Preceded by: Abdullah bin Howail
- Parliamentary group: independent

Personal details
- Born: Ali bin Majid bin Ali Hassan Al Majid Al-Naimi
- Occupation: attorney

Ali bin Majid bin Ali Hassan Al Majid Al-Naimi (Arabic: علي ماجد علي حسن الماجد النعيمي) is a Bahraini lawyer and politician. He was sworn into the Council of Representatives on December 12, 2018, representing the Seventh District of the Southern Governorate.

== Education ==
Al-Naimi earned a master's degree from the Applied Science University in 2012 and followed it up with a doctorate from the Institute of Arab Research and Studies (IARS), a division of the Arab League's Arab League Educational, Cultural and Scientific Organization. His dissertation for the latter was a comparative study of the state's responsibility for public servants' mistakes.

== Council of Representatives ==
In the 2018 Bahraini general election, Al-Naimi ran to represent the Seventh District in the Southern Governorate in the Council of Representatives, the nation's lower house of Parliament. He received 1,956 votes (28.07%) in the first round on November 24. Since a candidate must secure more than 50% (an absolute majority) of the total votes in their constituency to be declared the outright winner, this result necessitated a runoff on December 1, in which he defeated his opponent, Ahmed Al-Tamimi, with 3,267 votes (52.81%). Al-Naimi thus became the first person to win election as a deputy in the House of Representatives while his father, Majid bin Ali Al-Naimi, held a ministerial portfolio (Minister of Education).

== Controversy ==
In a 2016 report, the Financial and Administrative Control Department at the Civil Service Bureau reported Al-Naimi's absence for seven unaccounted for months from work at the National Institute for Human Rights during which he received BD17,542 ($46,407) in salaries.

During the 2018 Bahrain forged degree scandal, Al-Naimi's name came up due to his doctorate's provenance from the IARS, whose degrees are not recognized by the Ministry of Education. The Ministry had issued a statement in 2010, six years before Al-Naimi obtained the doctorate, stating that "significant reservations exist about the Arab League's Institute of Arab Research and Studies. [Therefore] we direct applicants to avoid registering there at the present time." Abdullah Al-Mutawa, Undersecretary of Education for Education and Curricular Affairs at the time, stressed in the same statement that "the National Committee for the Evaluation of Academic Qualifications will refuse to accredit new students at the Institute starting in 2010."

== Personal life ==
Al-Naimi is the son of Majid bin Ali Al-Naimi, Minister of Education since 2002.
