= Fatema Al Harbi =

Bahraini peace activist

- فاطمة الحربي
- Born: 1991 or 1992 (age 34–35); Riffa, Bahrain
- Education: Griffith University; SBS Swiss Business School (M.B.A.); Applied Science University (M.A.)
- Occupations: Peace activist and author
- Years active: 2020–present
- Employer: Sharaka
- Title: Director of Gulf Affairs, and CEO of Bahrain branch

Fatema Al Harbi (Arabic: فاطمة الحربي; born 1991 or 1992) is a Bahraini author, peace activist, former civil servant, and the Director of Gulf Affairs at the UAE-based Israeli-founded organization Sharaka, and CEO of the organization's Bahrain branch. She is also a One Young World/European Commission peace ambassador.

== Early life and education ==
Al Harbi is from Riffa, Bahrain. In 2008, Al Harbi, then 17 years, took part in the Olympic Youth Camp in conjunction with the 2008 Summer Olympics, representing the kingdom in Bahrain. The camp was an educational and cultural exchange program under the Olympic flag for young people aged 16 to 18.

Al Harbi studied management and political & government studies at Griffith University in Australia; she later earned an MBA in International Management at SBS Swiss Business School in Switzerland, and studied for her second master's degree in human resources at Applied Science University in Bahrain.

== Career ==
She has written five novels in Arabic about women's issues in Bahraini society, which incorporate love stories as they deal with issues such as gender equality, women empowerment, and mental health, and founded a podcast in Arabic.

From 2013 to 2020, Al Harbi worked as an employee of the Bahraini Ministry of Education.

In late 2020, Al Harbi became involved with Sharaka ("partnership" in Arabic), a non-governmental organization founded that year by young leaders from Israel, Bahrain, and the UAE promoting the Abraham Accords (bilateral agreements on Arab–Israeli normalization between Israel and the United Arab Emirates and between Israel and Bahrain), peace and cooperation in the region, and mutual dialogue, understanding, cooperation, and friendship. In November 2020 she visited Israel for the first time as part of a Sharaka delegation of Emiratis visiting Israeli Jews and Israeli Arab Muslims, Christians, and Druze. She was the first non-government Bahraini to visit Israel. When she returned to Bahrain she found that she had achieved notoriety as "the girl who went to Israel," and she was subject to death threats.

Following her visit, Al Harbi decided to quit her job to work for Sharaka full-time, advocating for peace. She visited Israel again in October 2021, and said: "As soon as I landed there, ... I saw how friendly the people were...People we didn’t know at all kept approaching us, asking, 'Are you from Bahrain or Dubai?' They kept saying, 'Welcome to Israel!'" She also visited Yad Vashem, Israel's memorial museum to the Holocaust, and posted about it on Instagram and Twitter. This time upon her return to Bahrain most reactions were positive, with some people approaching her to ask how they could visit Israel.

In 2023, Al Harbi became the Director of Gulf Affairs at Sharaka, and is the head of its Bahrain branch in Manama. As part of her work with Sharaka, Al Harbi has since visited Israel two other times. She has also visited the United States on Sharaka speaking tours. In 2022 and 2023, she was part of Sharaka's delegation to the March of the Living in Poland, a Holocaust commemoration event, and the site of the Auschwitz extermination camp.

== Personal life ==
Al Harbi wears a hijab. She says that she has lost friends due to her efforts to make peace with Israelis. In 2022, she said that she began posting about the Holocaust on social media in response to widespread Holocaust denial in the Arab world.

== Recognitions and honours ==
In 2022, Al Harbi was named a One Young World and European Commission Peace Ambassador; the program supports young people working to prevent and counter violent extremism in their communities. That year she was also a Scholar-in-Residence at Oxford University, Pembroke College, for the ISGAP-Oxford Summer Institute for Curriculum Development in Critical Antisemitism Studies.

In 2024, she was nominated by the U.S. State Department for the International Visitor Leadership Program on "Human and Civil Rights in Marginalized Communities".
