= Al Qurayyah, Bahrain =

Al Qurayyah اَلْقُرَيَّة
- Village
- Al Qurayyah within Kingdom of Bahrain
- Coordinates: 26.2°N 50.466°E
- Country: Kingdom of Bahrain
- Governorate: Northern Governorate

Al Qurayyah (Arabic: اَلْقُرَيَّة) is a small village situated in western Bahrain. It lies west of Saar, north of the village of Jasra, and to the south of Bani Jamra. The village is host to multiple compounds housing expatriate workers.
