= Majed bin Ali Al-Naimi =

Bahraini Minister

Majed bin Ali Al-Naimi (Arabic: ماجد بن علي النعيمي) is the head of the National Archive Center and the former Minister of Education of Bahrain.

== Early life and education ==
Al-Naimi holds a Doctorate of Economic History from the University of Wales, a Master of Military Science from the Saudi Armed Forces Command and Staff College, a Master of Gulf History from Ain Shams University in Egypt, and a Bachelor of Arts in History from Kuwait University.

== Career ==
Al-Naimi entered public service upon his graduation, eventually rising to the presidency of the University of Bahrain, which he held from 2001 to 2002. On November 11, 2002, he was appointed Minister of Education by a decree of King Hamad bin Isa Al Khalifa.

== Personal life ==
His son Ali bin Majid Al-Naimi is a member of the Council of Representatives.
