= Umm Al Hassam =

Umm al Hassam أم الحصم
- Neighborhood
- Etymology: Mother of Sea Shells
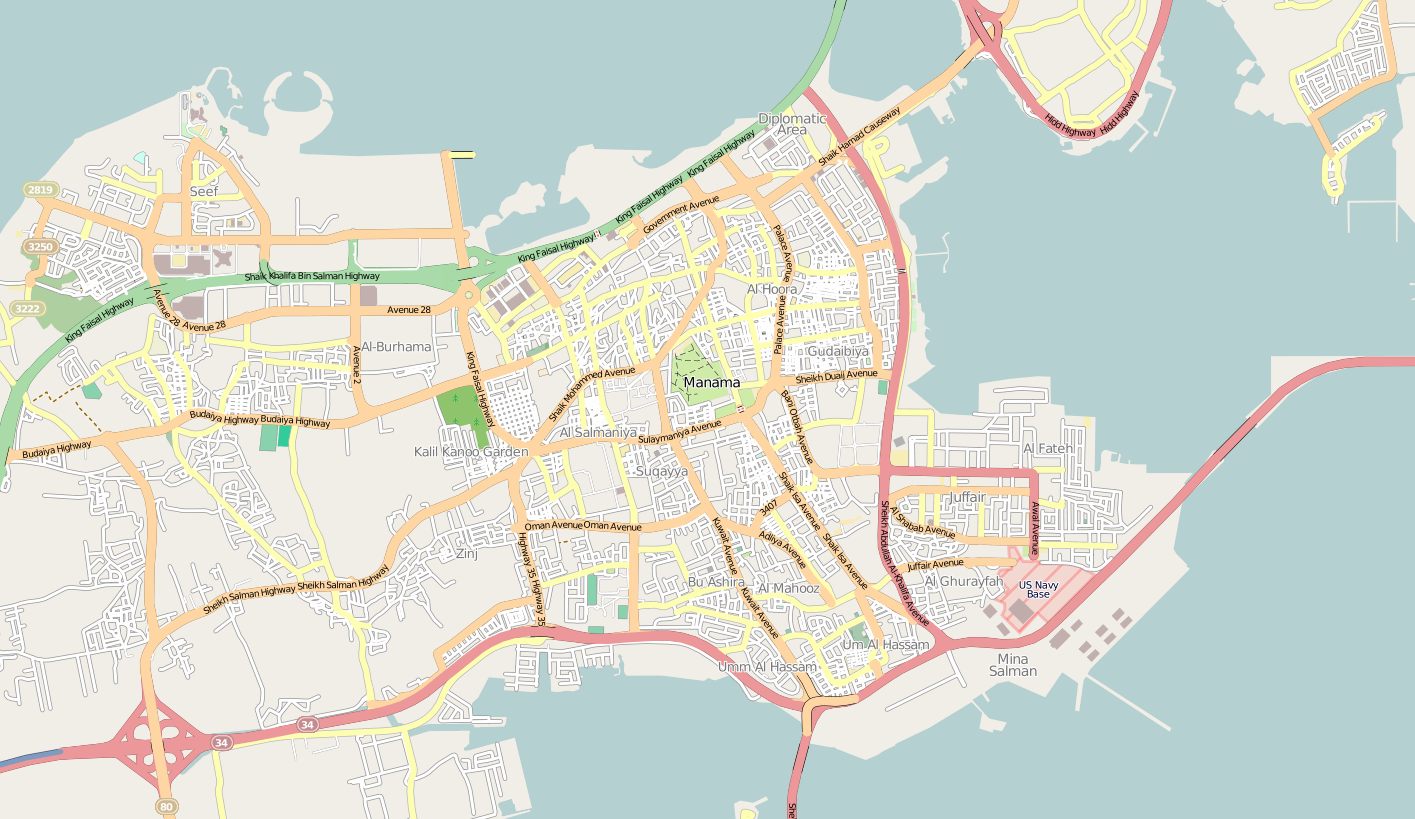
- Location in Bahrain Umm al Hassam (Manama)
- Coordinates: 26°12′13″N 50°36′6″E
- Country: Bahrain
- Governorate: Capital Governorate

Umm Al Hassam (Arabic: أم الحصم) (trans. Mother of Sea Shells) is a middle-class neighbourhood on the southern coast of Manama, the capital of Bahrain. The neighborhood is home to the majority of Bahrain's local Jewish community. It consists of a mixture of grand villas and newer apartment buildings, and is well known for its Lebanese and Indian restaurants.

Abdulaziz Shamlan, a Bahraini nationalist leader from the 1950s and later Bahrain's Ambassador in Cairo, is one of the area's most famous ex-residents, along with the late Yousuf Abdulrahman Engineer, whose house symbolizes tradition. Umm Al Hassam maintains its leftist tradition as the location of the large headquarters for the National Democratic Action, the country's largest leftist political party.
