= Hayvi Bouzo =

Syrian-born American journalist

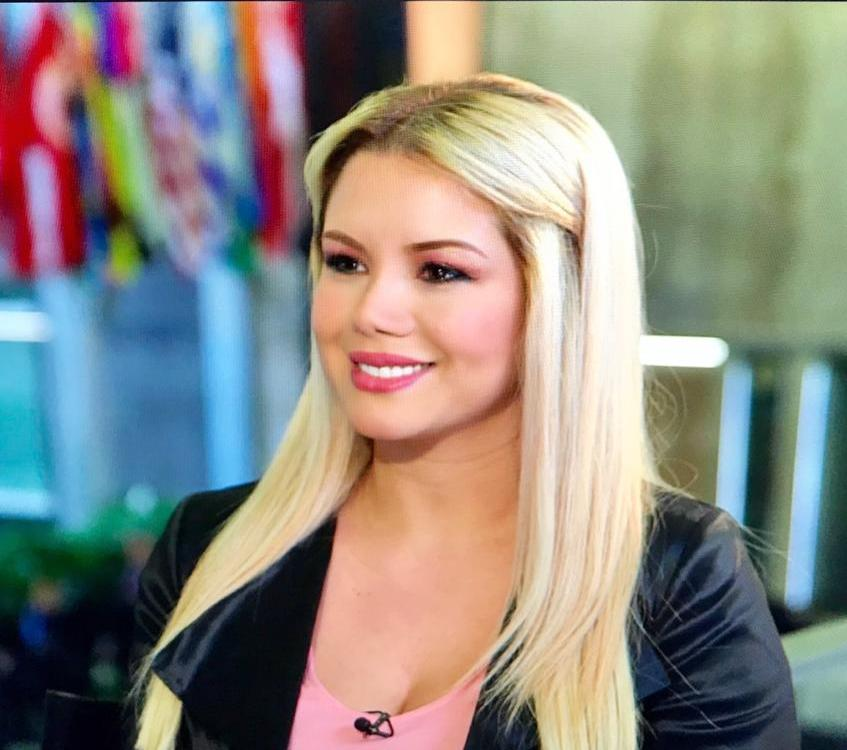
- Occupations: Broadcast journalist, columnist, television presenter
- Years active: 2006– present
- Known for: Co-founder of Yalla Productions
- Website: hayvibouzo.com

Hayvi Bouzo (Arabic: هيفي بوظو) is a Syrian-born American broadcast journalist, columnist and television presenter of Kurdish descent.

Bouzo co-founded Yalla Productions with Trump administration political appointee Len Khodorkovsky where she hosts the Yalla Show.

Bouzo's writing and commentary have been featured in newspapers and outlets including Khaleej Times. and The Jerusalem Post.

== Career ==
Bouzo started her media career in 2006 in Syria. She is best known as the main host of the political television show, The Axis. After training at Sham TV from 2007 to 2008, she began working at Orient TV, where she hosted two entertainment TV shows titled "In and Out" and "Dramatech".

On 2012, Buozo became a news correspondent for Orient News in Washington D.C. She became the Washington D.C. Bureau Chief, with a political news show called "The Axis". In this program, Hayvi interviews prominent U.S. officials, newsmakers, and scholars. The show maintains coverage over U.S. politics, as well as international relations between the U.S., the Middle East and the wider Arab world. She has interviewed high-profile American officials including John Kerry, John McCain, Jack Keane, Pete Sessions, Brian Hook, Adam Kinzinger, Elliot Engel, Heather Nauert, as well as Members of the European Parliament (MEPs), European Government Ministers, among many others.

On the Yalla Show, Hayvi Bouzo, interviewed former Secretary of State Mike Pompeo, where they talked about his role in the historic Abraham Accords, his views about the importance of religious coexistence in the Middle East. Unlike traditional interviews with politicians and former officials, the Yalla show interviews focus on the guest as a person. In this interview Pompeo talks about himself as a father, a husband and shared his favorite foods and movies.

=== Interview with Israeli Ambassador to the UN, Danny Danon ===
On March 20, 2018, Hayvi conducted an interview with Ambassador Danny Danon, Israel's Ambassador to the United Nations. During this interview, the two discussed the dire humanitarian situation in Syria and Israel's response, the atrocities of the Assad Regime and other critical issues such as the threats posed by Iran, Hezbollah and terrorist organizations.
The interview elicited widespread coverage and strong response in the Middle East, with both neutral reactions and criticism.

== Collaboration with the Trump administration ==
Since April 2018, she has participated in several private round-tables with President Donald Trump, where they discussed the conflict in Syria, U.S. policy in the Middle East, and other pressing issues.

== Stances ==
Bouzo supports the Arab-Israeli normalization.
