= Eker =

Area in Bahrain

Coordinates: 26.1458°N 50.6040°E

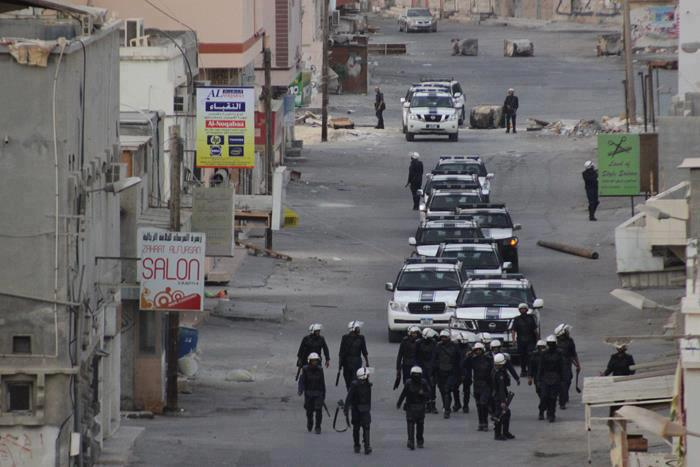

Eker (Arabic: العكر), sometimes spelled Ekar, is an area in Bahrain, located near the villages of Nuwaidrat, Ma'ameer and the island of Sitra.

It is divided into 2 regions: East Eker and West Eker, with Shias making up the majority of the former's population.

In 2012 a bombing targeted riot police in the area, injuring 7 policemen, 3 of them seriously.
