= Tubli Bay =

Bay of Bahrain

Coordinates: 26.185°N 50.594°E

Designations

Ramsar Wetland
- Designated: 27 October 1997
- Reference no.: 921

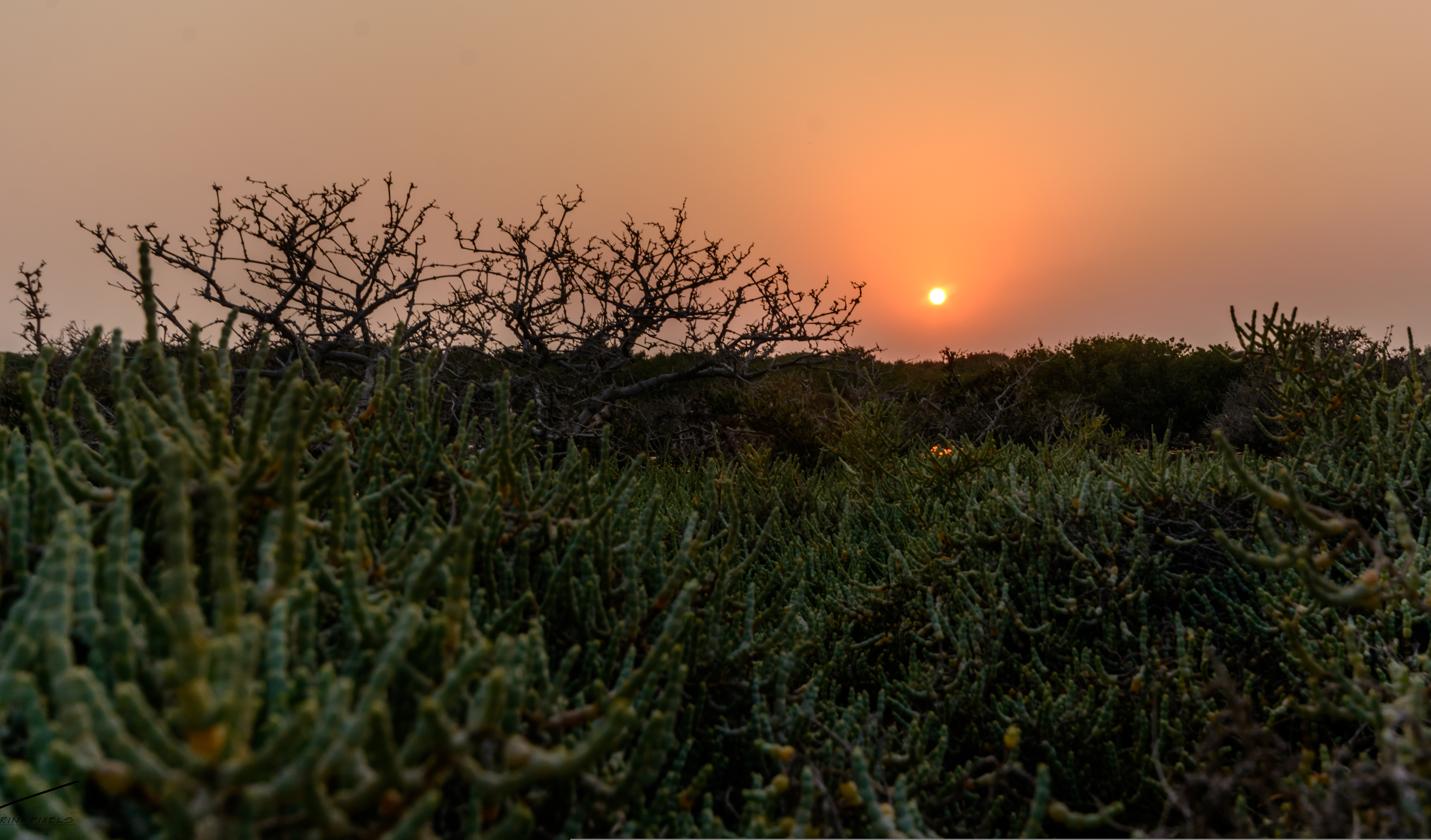
Ras Sanad Mangrove Forest

Tubli Bay (Arabic: خليج توبلي) (also known as the Gulf of Tubli) is a bay in the east of Bahrain, between Bahrain Island and Sitra island. The body of water is directly south of the Manama peninsula. The island of Nabih Saleh lies in the bay.

== Environment ==
The area was known for its rich marine and bird life, and the mangrove forests around its borders. The mangroves thrived on the run-off of freshwater springs after it passed through farms into the bay.

=== Wildlife ===
The bay is a major breeding ground for shrimp and fishes. It is also a stopover for several migratory bird species. The bay has been designated an Important Bird Area (IBA) by BirdLife International because it supports significant passage or wintering populations of waders and gulls, including grey, Kentish and Siberian sand plovers, and broad-billed sandpipers, dunlins and slender-billed gulls. Other wintering species include little egrets, common ringed plovers, little stints, ruddy turnstones, and Pallas's and black-headed gulls.

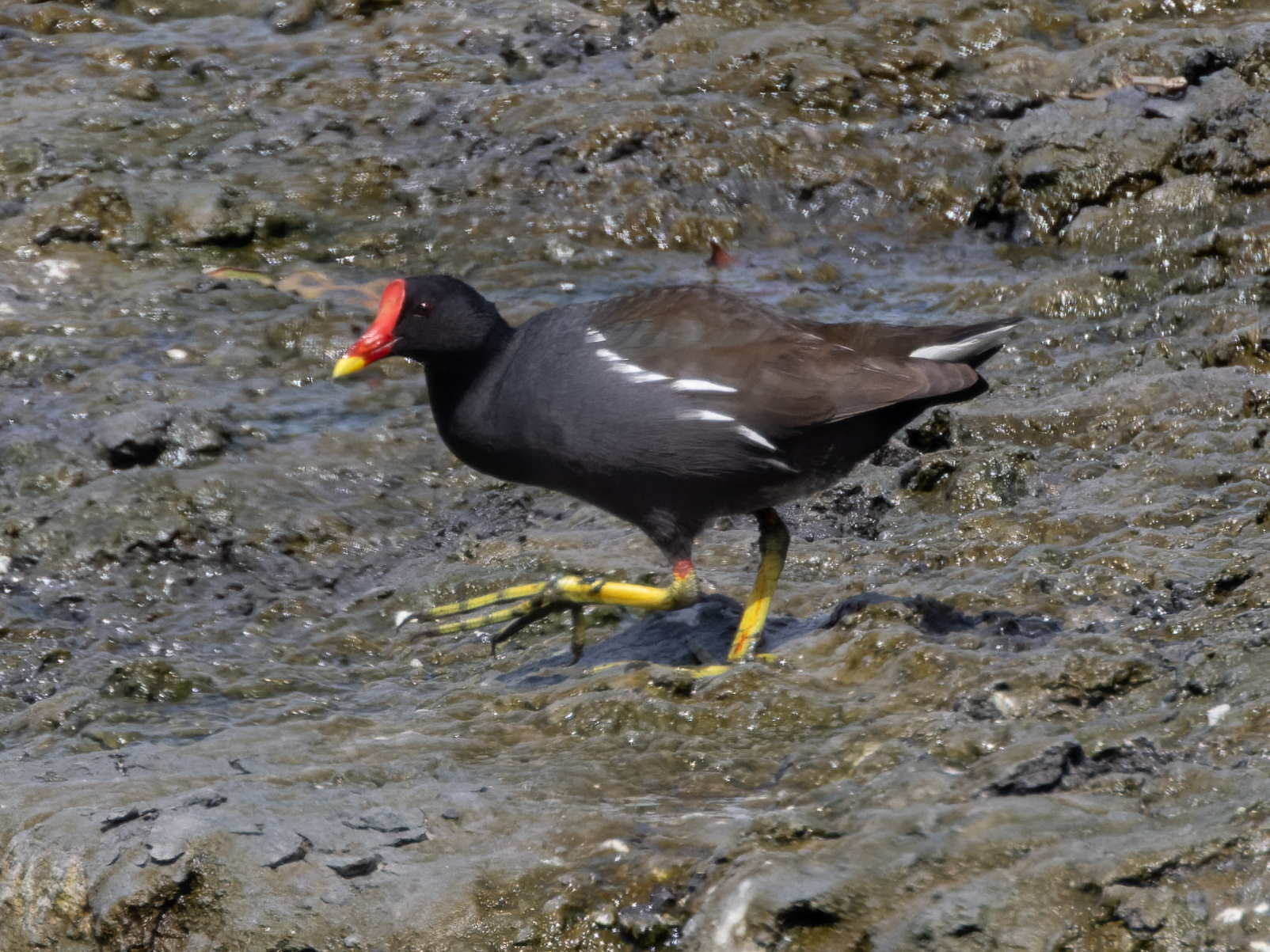
Gallinula chloropus in Tubli Bay

=== Conservation ===
Tubli Bay has suffered from illegal land reclamation, environmental pollution and decreasing freshwater supply from springs. Land reclamation has reduced the size from 25 km^{2} in the 1960s to just 11 km^{2} today. The mangroves that used to exist along much of the coast have been reduced to just a few small patches at Ras Sanad and Ras Tubli.

In 1997, Tubli Bay was added to the list of Ramsar wetlands of international importance.
