= Chama Mechtaly =

Moroccan artist and activist (born 1992)

- شامة مشتالي
- Born: July 1992 (age 33–34); Casablanca, Morocco
- Education: Brandeis University

Chama Mechtaly (Arabic: شامة مشتالي; born July 1992) is a Moroccan artist and activist based in Dubai.

== Early life and education ==
Mechtaly was born and raised in Casablanca by a Muslim mother and paternally Jewish father. Her paternal grandfather was Amazigh-Jewish, but converted to Islam to marry her paternal grandmother, who was Muslim. In high school, Mechtaly became interested in her family history, and more broadly in the influence of Jewish history and culture on Morocco. She remained in Morocco until age 17.

She attended college in the United States, studying conflict resolution and international relations at Brandeis University in Waltham, Massachusetts through a scholarship. There, she became interested in the Jewish concept of tikkun olam and in building peaceful relations between Muslim and Jewish communities in the Middle East.

== Art career ==
Mechtaly began painting and drawing as a child, and was encouraged by her father to pursue art. She began using oil paints at age 15.

While studying in the United States, Mechtaly exhibited in the Boston area. Her first solo exhibition was at the American Islamic Congress’ Newbury Street art gallery in April 2013.

In 2015, while exhibiting at Complexe Culturel Sidi Belyout, the director removed her pieces, DrapeauMarocainRevisité (Moroccan Flag Revisited), out of concern that it might incite "aggressive behavior". The piece is a painting of the Moroccan flag, with a green Star of David on the red background, as opposed to the usual five pointed star. She was also later threatened with charges of "deformation of national emblems".

In 2021, Mechtaly co-curated Maktoub, the first Jerusalem-UAE art exhibition, which focused on ten calligraphers, five from each country. Her own art was also included in the exhibit, which was organized in collaboration with the Jerusalem Biennale.

In 2022, Mechtaly launched an NFT artwork in honor of women and the then-recent Abraham Accords.

Mechtaly was a 2023-2024 fellow of the Atlantic Council's WIn Fellowship.

=== Style and themes ===
Mechtaly's work tends to focus on Moroccan culture, history, and pluralism. She has painted portraits of both Amazigh and Jewish women, and created paintings which involve Arabic and Hebrew calligraphy.

=== Moors and Saints ===
Mechtaly is the founder of Moors and Saints, a Dubai-based jewelry brand. The pieces are handmade in Dubai from gold, silver, and precious stones. The brand does not use diamonds, as part of a mission to be "conflict free".

The brand draws on influences such as Moorish architecture from Andalusia during the Golden Age of Spain, during which there was religious tolerance between Muslims and Jews.

The brand debuted in September 2019, during Dubai Design Week. The first three collections were Granada (inspired by Alhambra), Marrakesh (inspired by the city's zellij tiles), and Cairo (inspired by Al-Azhar Mosque).

== Activism ==
Mechtaly has spoken in favor of the Abraham Accords, and in November 2021 was part of a delegation which promoted the agreements in the United States.

Mechtaly has donated some profits from Moors and Saints to Banat el Emarat, a UAE-based NGO focused on women's empowerment.

== Personal life ==
Mechtaly moved to the United Arab Emirates in the late 2010s.

She considers herself to be an intersectional feminist, a Zionist, and an "advocate for interfaith dialogue and pluralism".
