= Chama, Zambia =

Town in Eastern Province, Zambia

Coordinates: 11°13′S 33°09′E

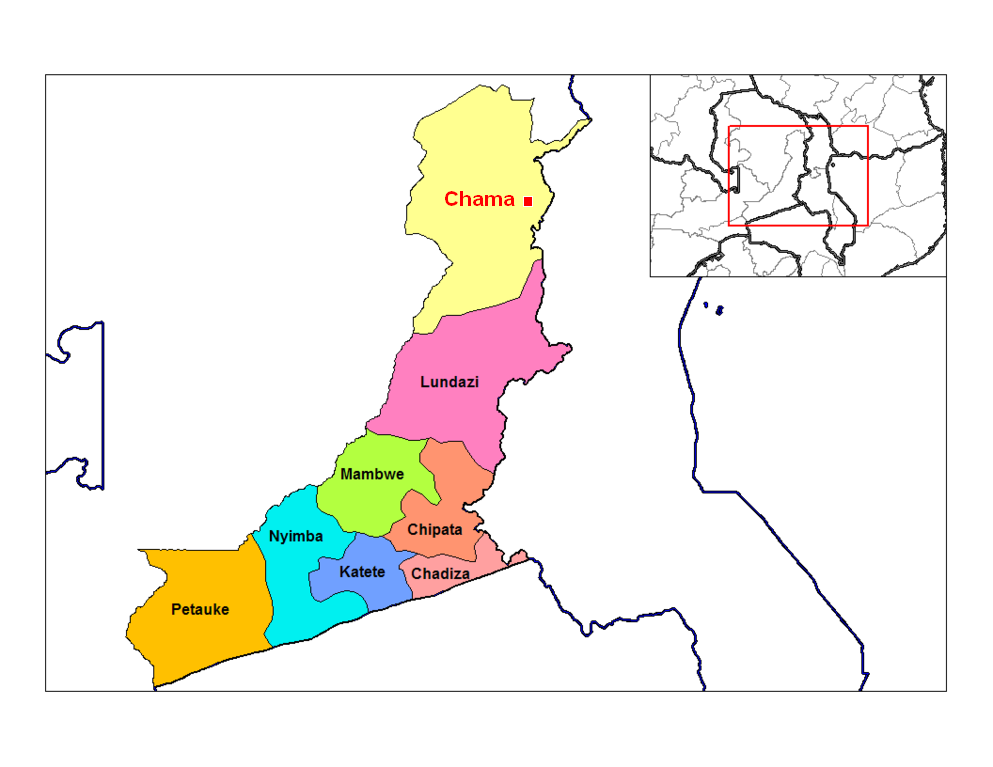
Location of Chama town and district in Eastern Province, Zambia

Chama is a small town in the Eastern Province of Zambia, and is headquarters of Chama District. It is one of the most remote district headquarters in the country, lying just inside the eastern edge of the upper Luangwa Rift Valley, at the foot of the highlands dividing Zambia and Malawi. It is served by only one gravel road which comes from Lundazi and the provincial capital of the Eastern Province, Chipata, 300 km to the south. A dirt track connects the town to the South Luangwa National Park 200 km south-west, running parallel to the Luangwa River. A little-used dirt track follows the Malawi border further north and crosses into Isoka District west of the Nyika Plateau. The Road Development Agency is also developing a road from Chama westwards across the Luangwa River to the town of Matumbo, where the road will end at a junction with the T2 Road, Zambia's Great North Road. It is meant to be the 2nd main road out of Chama after the Lundazi-Chipata Route and is meant to provide access for Chama Residents to the headquarters of Muchinga Province, which is Chinsali.
