= Nabih Saleh =

Island of Bahrain located in the Arabian Gulf

Nabih Saleh Island
Native name: جزيرة النبيه صالح (Arabic)
- Location within Bahrain

Geography
- Location: Persian Gulf
- Coordinates: 26.183°N 50.585°E
- Archipelago: Bahrain
- Adjacent to: Persian Gulf
- Total islands: 1
- Major islands: Nabih Saleh
- Area: 1.4 km^{2} (0.54 sq mi)
- Length: 1.4 km (0.87 mi)
- Width: 1.2 km (0.75 mi)
- Coastline: 9 km (5.6 mi)
- Highest elevation: 3.5 m (11.5 ft)
- Highest point: Nabih Saleh graveyard

Administration
- Bahrain
- Governorate: Capital Governorate
- Largest settlement: Nabih Saleh (pop. 3,150)

Demographics
- Demonym: Bahraini
- Population: 3,200 (2019)
- Pop. density: 2,300/km^{2} (6000/sq mi)
- Ethnic groups: Bahraini, non-Bahraini

Additional information
- Time zone: AST (UTC+3)
- ISO code: BH-14

Nabih Saleh (Arabic: النبيه صالح) is an island of Bahrain in the Persian Gulf. It lies in the Tubli Bay, east of Bahrain Island, and is 2.5 km (1.6 mi) south of the capital, Manama, on Bahrain Island.

== Etymology ==
The island is named for the formerly separate islands of Nebbi and Saleh. The island was named after the Shi'ite holy man, Salih, who received the title "Nabih Saleh" due to his asceticism and was buried on the island, where his tomb, the Shrine of Nabih Saleh, still stands.

== History ==
This island originally, like Sitra, was covered with farms and date palm groves, but now it has been denuded by mass deforestation. In 2016 renovation works began on the island

== Demography ==
There are three neighborhoods located on the island: Kaflan, Quryah, and Juzayyirah (occupied by Bahrain Defence Force as officers club).

== Administration ==
The island belongs to the Capital Governorate of Bahrain.

== Transportation ==
It is connected to both Bahrain Island and Sitra through the Sitra Causeway.

== Image gallery ==
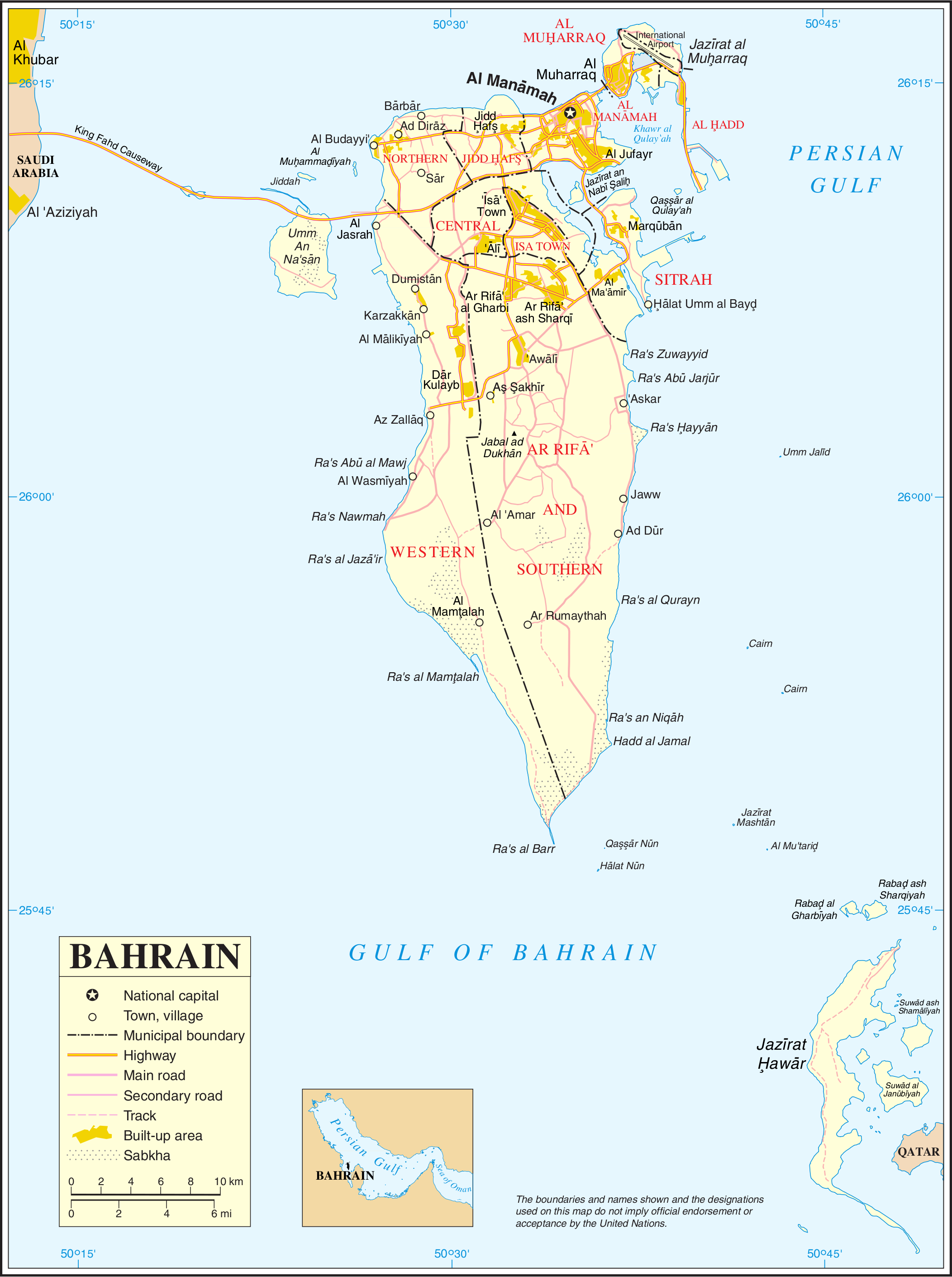
Map 1

District Map

== See also ==
- List of islands of Bahrain
