= List of cities and towns in Bahrain =

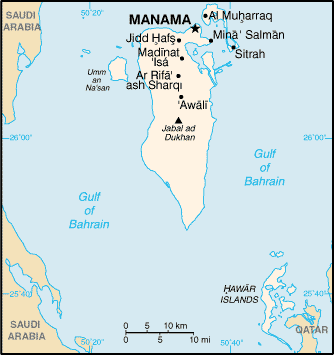
Map of Bahrain

This is a list of cities and towns in Bahrain with listed governorates and population figures for the most populous cities:

== Ten largest cities ==
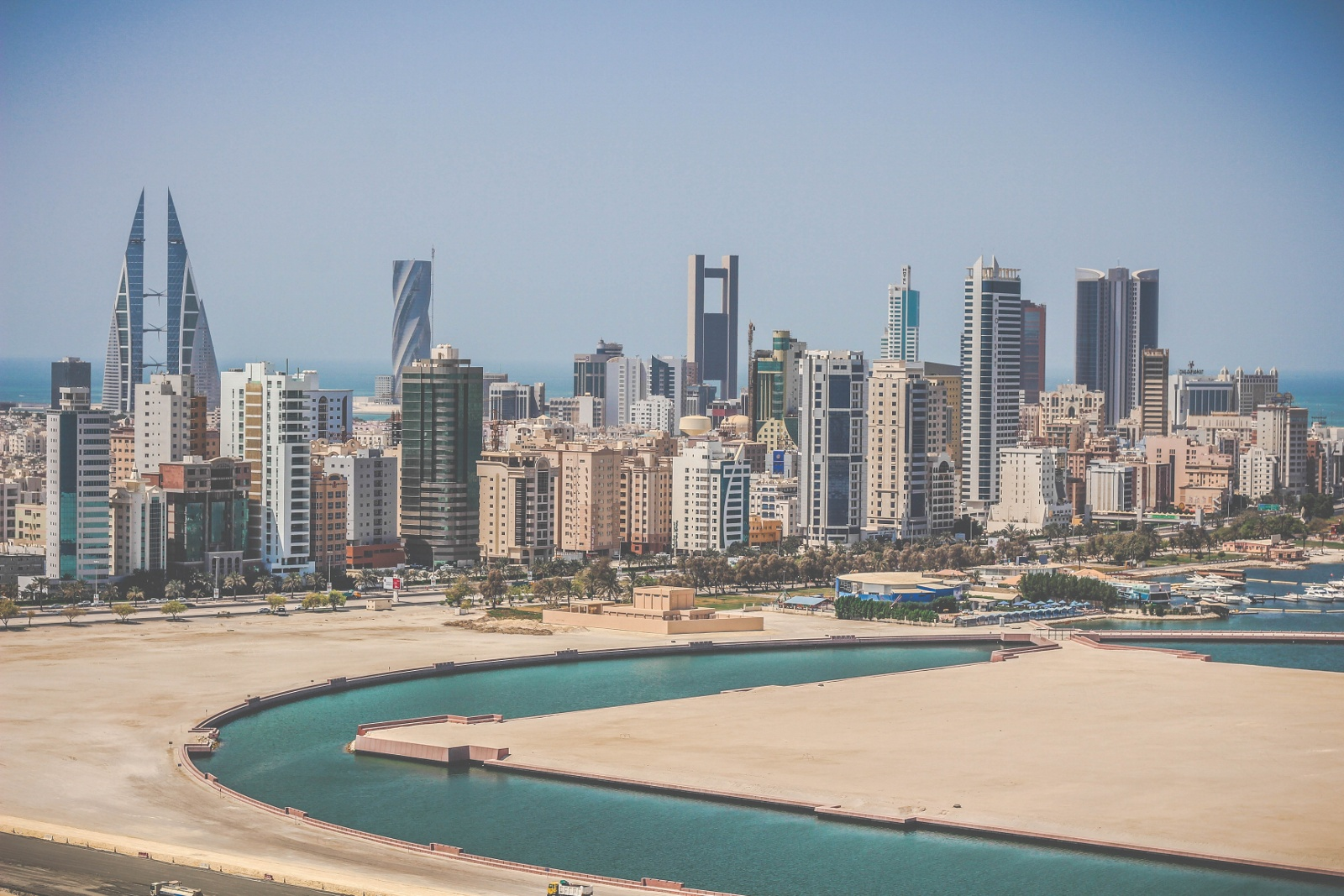
Manama

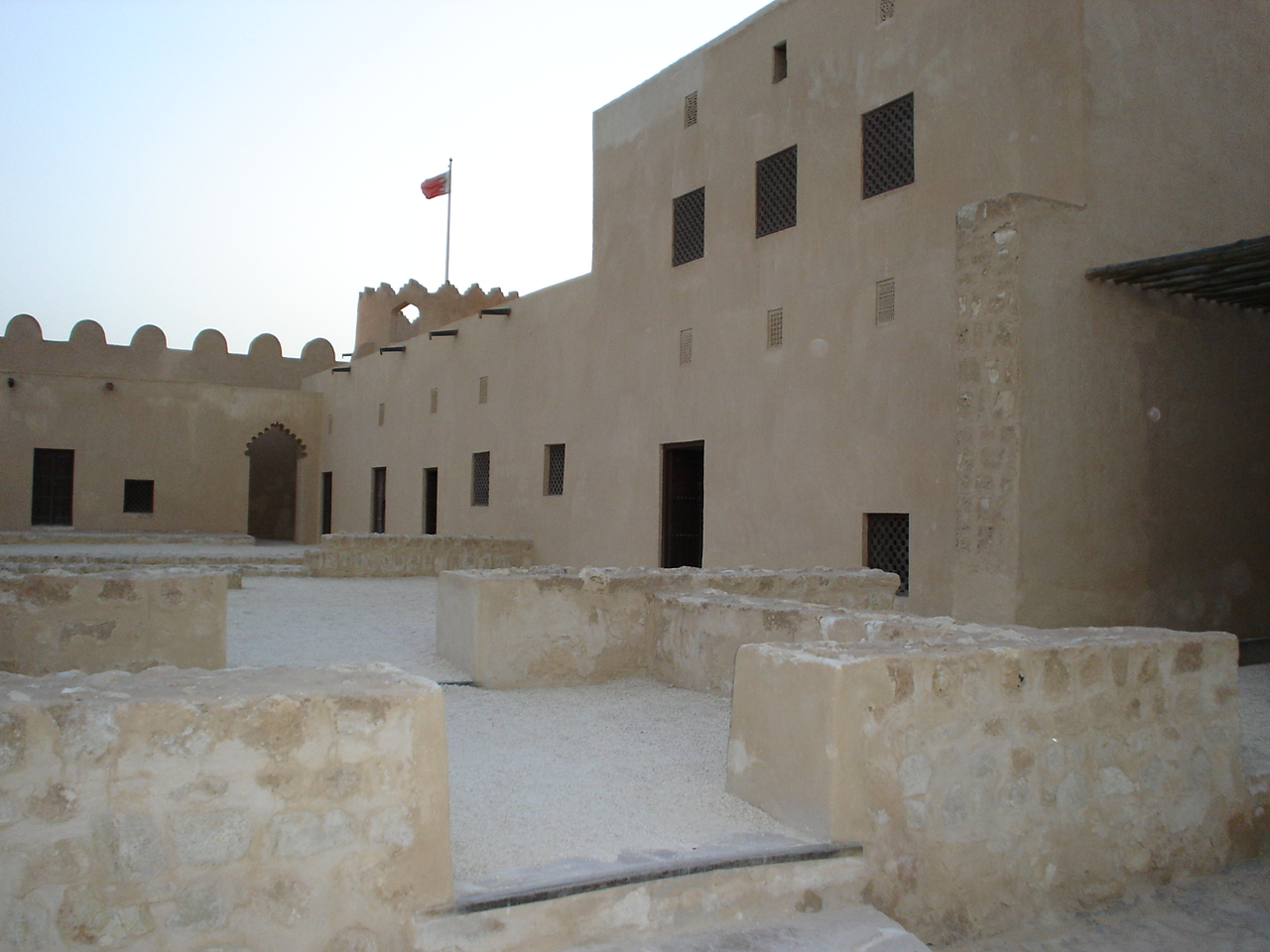
Riffa

1. Manama – 743,066
2. Muharraq – 263,373
3. Hamad Town – 133,550
4. Riffa – 115,495
5. A'ali – 100,533
6. Sitra – 72,601
7. Jidhafs – 66,588
8. Isa Town – 61,293
9. Budaiya – 33,230
10. Diraz – 18,000

== Other towns ==
1. Jid Ali
2. Sanabis
3. Tubli
4. Sanad
5. Durrat Al Bahrain
6. Gudaibiya
7. Salmabad
8. Jurdab
9. Diyar Al Muharraq
10. Amwaj Islands
11. Al Hidd
12. Arad
13. Busaiteen
14. Samaheej
15. Al Dair
16. Zinj

== Northern Governorate ==
- A'ali
- Abu Saiba
- Al Hajar
- Al Lawzi
- Al Markh
- Al Qadam
- Al Qala
- Al Safiria
- Barbar
- Boori
- Budaiya
- Buquwa
- Dar Kulaib
- Diraz
- Dumistan
- Hamad Town
- Hamala
- Hillat Abdul Saleh
- Jablat Habshi
- Janabiya
- Jannusan
- Jasra
- Jid Al-Haj
- Jidda Island
- Karrana
- Karzakan
- Malikiya
- Sanabis
- Muqaba
- North Sehla
- Northern City
- Nurana Islands
- Qurayya
- Saar
- Sadad
- Salmabad
- Shahrakan
- Shakhura
- Umm an Nasan
- Umm as Sabaan
- Zayed City
