= Geography of Bahrain =

Coordinates: 26°00′N 50°33′E

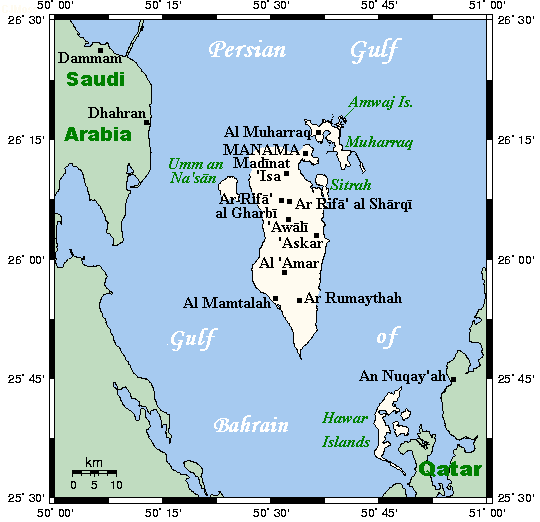
Map of Bahrain

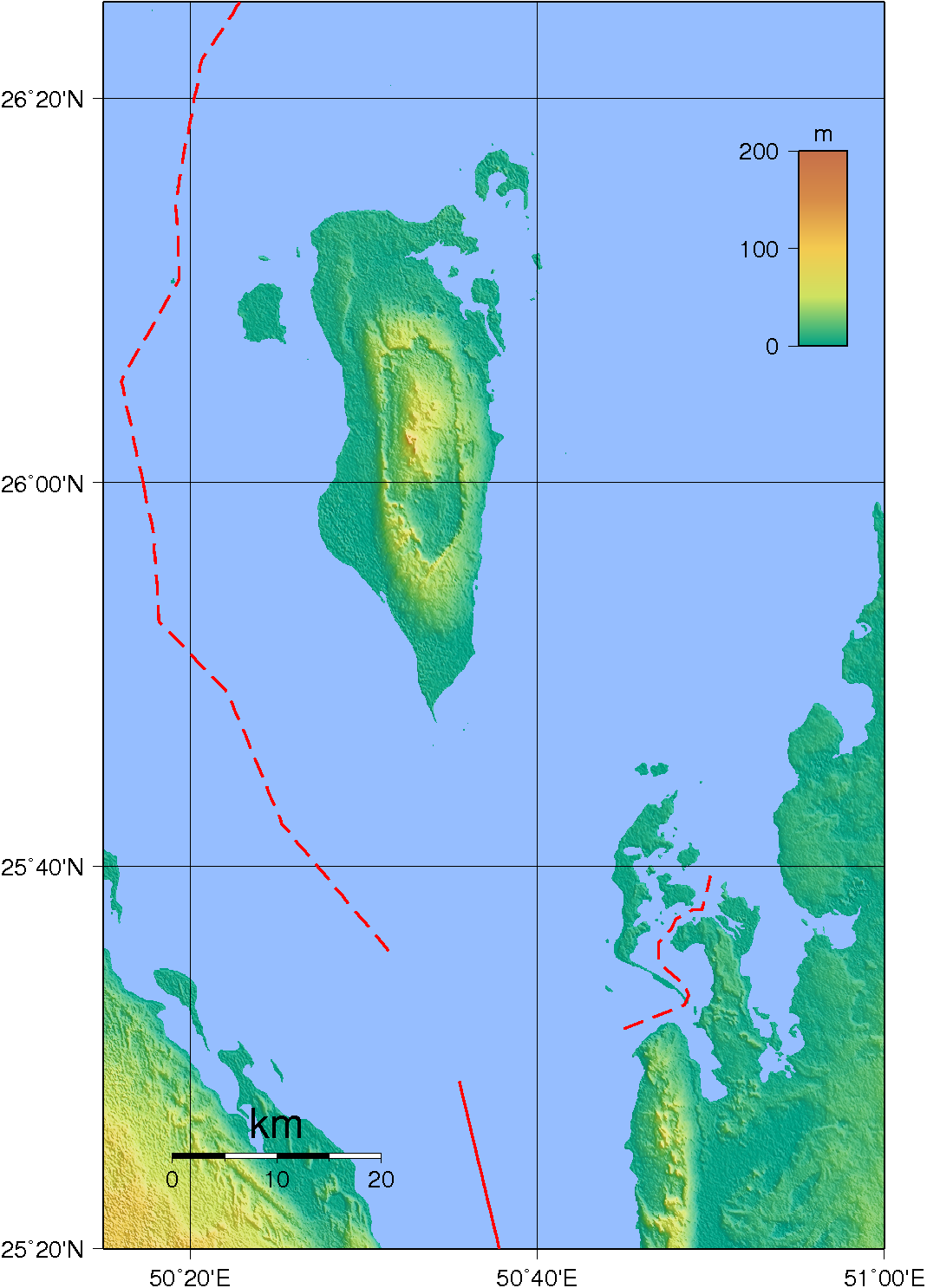
Topography

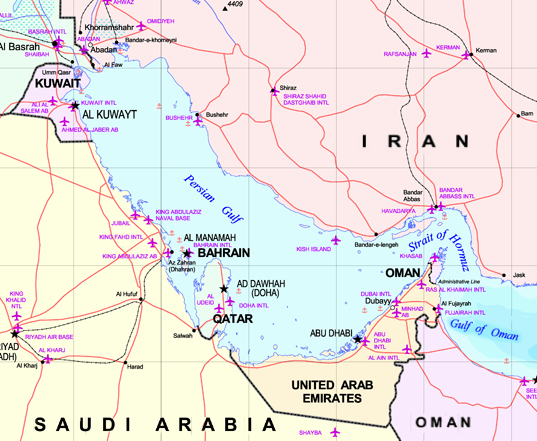
Persian Gulf

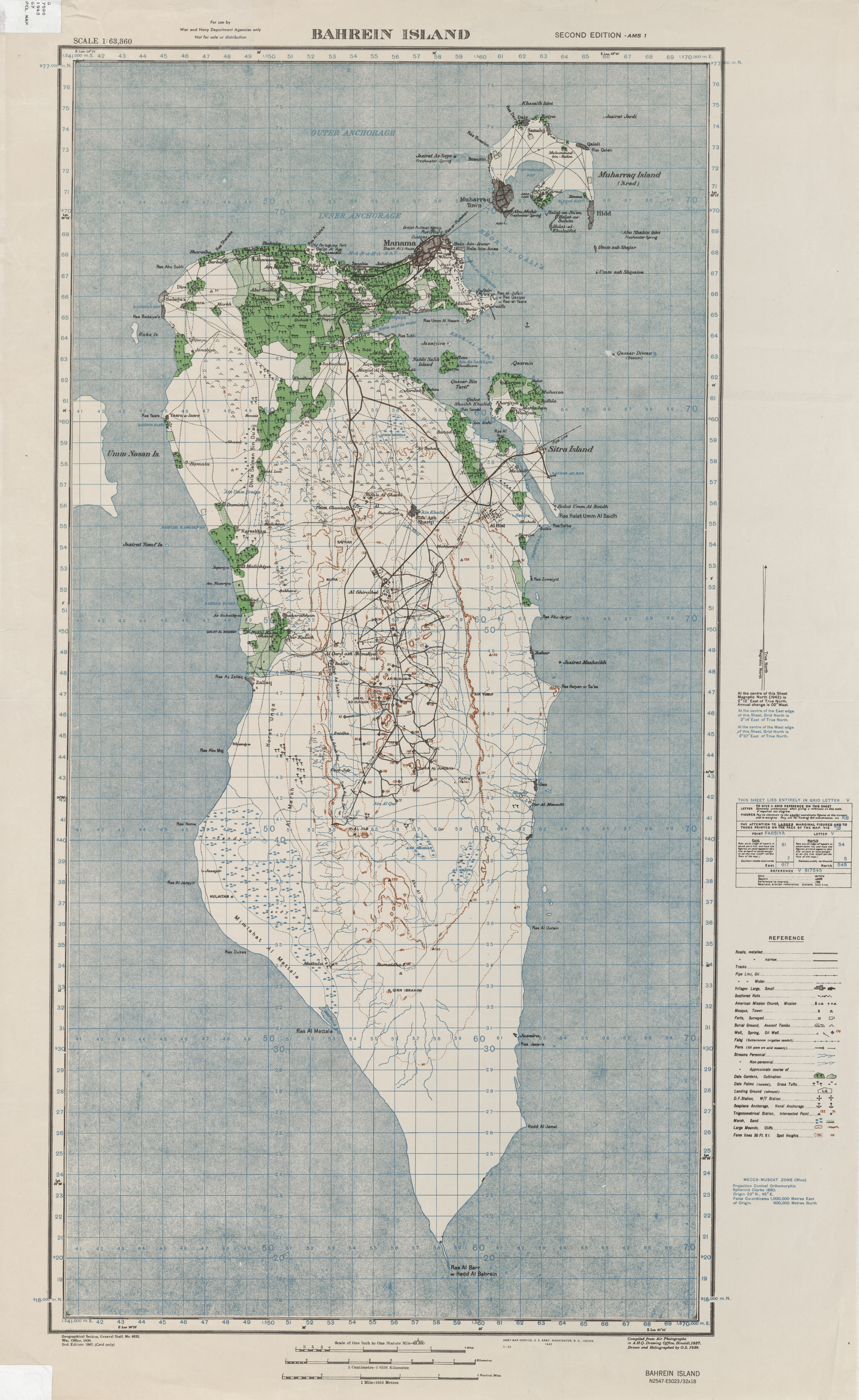
American army map of Bahrain, 1943.

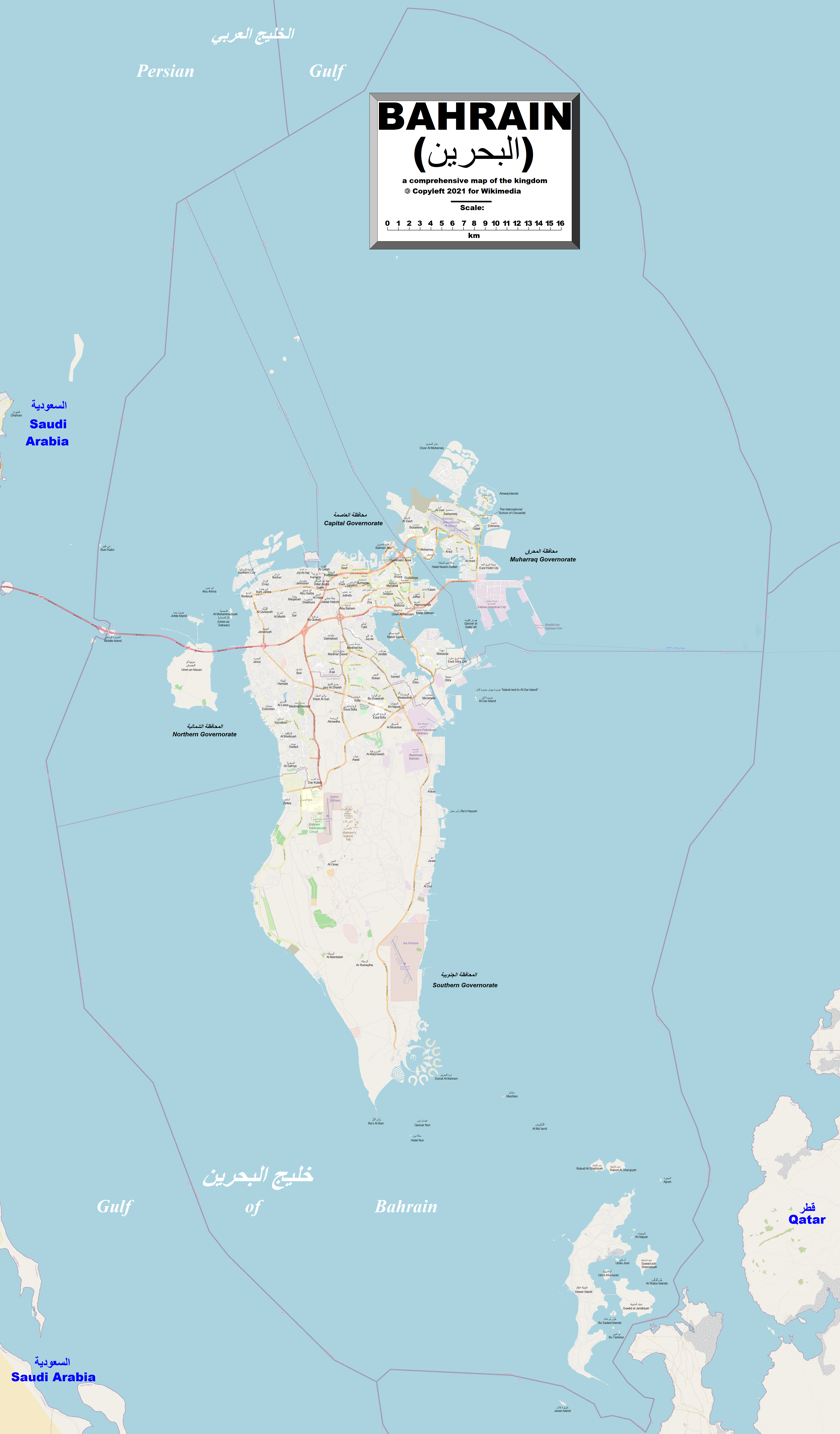
Enlargeable, detailed map of Bahrain, with most features marked in both English and Arabic

The Kingdom of Bahrain consists of Bahrain Island and 33 of the 37 Bahrain Islands, lying in the Persian Gulf's Gulf of Bahrain off the north shore of West Asia's Arabian Peninsula. Bahrain's capital city is Manama. The islands are about 24 kilometers (15 mi) off the east coast of Saudi Arabia and 28 kilometers (17 mi) from Qatar. The total area of the country is about 694 square kilometers (268 sq mi), about four times the size of the District of Columbia. Bahrain underwent considerable land reclamation since the 20th century, adding at least 80 square kilometres to the country's land area.

Bahrain Island accounts for about 78% of the kingdom's land area, comprising 604 square kilometers (233 sq mi). It is 48 kilometers (30 mi) long from north to south and at its widest point stretches 16 kilometers (10 mi) from east to west. The island is surrounded by several of West Asia's large petroleum fields and commands a strategic position amid the Persian Gulf's shipping lanes.

== Geographical setting and islands ==
Following the return of Janan to Qatar in March 2001, the state of Bahrain consists of 33 natural islands in the Bahrain Islands archipelago.

Around most of Bahrain is a relatively shallow inlet of the Persian Gulf known as the Gulf of Bahrain. The seabed adjacent to Bahrain is rocky and, mainly off the northern part of the island, covered by extensive coral reefs. Most of the island is a low-lying and barren desert. Outcroppings of limestone form low rolling hills, stubby cliffs, and shallow ravines. The limestone is covered by various densities of saline sand, capable of supporting only the hardiest desert vegetation – chiefly thorn trees and scrub. There is a fertile strip five kilometres wide along the northern coast on which date, almond, fig, and pomegranate trees grow. The interior contains an escarpment that rises to 134 meters, the highest point on the island, to form Jabal al Dukhan (Mountain of Smoke), named for the mists that often wreathe the summit. Most of the country's oil wells are situated in the vicinity of Jabal al Dukhan.

One author writes about the geology of the nation: "Bahrein lies on a portion of the ancient Tethys Ocean geosynclinal belt represented today by the Persian Gulf. The formation of the principal island is the result of pressure from the mountain masses of Persia against the crystalline platform of central Asia, the thrust being absorbed by gentle folding in the geosynclines. The structure of Bahrein is that of a large, single, closed dome covering the entire faulting".

Rocks exposed at the surface consist of:

- Recent sands and coquinas forming flat, raised beaches surrounding the island from which the surface rises gradually to an elevation 150 to 200 feet above sea level. At this point it breaks away into inward-facing cliffs eighty to one hundred feet high completely surrounding an oval central depression about twelve miles long and four wide.
- Pleistocene sands, cross-bedded and probably wind-deposited, lying in the canyon.
- Miocene silicious clay covering a very limited area.
- Eocene limestone covering most of the island, the central region of which, known as “Jabal Dukhān “Mountain of Smoke”, rises to a point 439 feet above sea level. The limestone is very porous and is the source of most of the water in the northern half of the island.

In addition to Bahrain Island, other islands of significance include Nabih Saleh, which is northwest of Sitra; Jidda Island and Umm as Sabaan, to the north of Umm an Nasan; and the Hawar Islands archipelago – a group of islands to the south, the largest of which is Hawar, near the coast of Qatar. Nabih Saleh contains several freshwater springs that are used to irrigate the island's the extensive date palm groves. The rocky islet of Jiddah formerly housed the state prison but has now been converted to a private residence. the Hawar Islands archipelago used to be the subject of a territorial dispute between Bahrain and Qatar. Hawar is nineteen kilometres long and about one and one-half kilometres wide. The other islands (such as the Al Garum Islands to the North) are uninhabited and are nesting sites for a variety of migratory birds.

In Bahrain forest cover is around 1% of the total land area, equivalent to 700 hectares (ha) of forest in 2020, up from 220 hectares (ha) in 1990. For the year 2015, 100% of the forest area was reported to be under public ownership.

== Climate ==
Bahrain features an arid climate. Bahrain has two seasons: an extremely hot summer and a relatively mild winter. During the summer months, from April to October, afternoon temperatures average 40 °C (104 °F) and can reach 46 °C (114.8 °F) during May, June and July. The combination of intense heat and high humidity makes this season uncomfortable. In addition, a hot, dry southwest wind, known locally as the qaws, periodically blows sand clouds across the barren southern end of Bahrain toward Manama in the summer. Temperatures moderate in the winter months, from November to March, when the range is between 10 and 20 °C (50 and 68 °F). However, humidity often rises above 90% in the winter. From December to March, prevailing winds from the northwest, known as the shamal, bring damp air over the islands. Regardless of the season, daily temperatures are fairly uniform throughout the archipelago. Note that the coldest temperature ever recorded in Bahrain was on January 20, 1964, when it dropped to −5 °C (23 °F) in Awali and 2.7 °C (36 °F) at Bahrain International Airport. That particular freeze was accompanied by a white-out, with icicles forming on trees and fences at Awali.

Bahrain receives little precipitation. The average annual rainfall is 72 millimeters (2.8 in), usually confined to the winter months. No permanent rivers or streams exist on any of the islands. The winter rains tend to fall in brief, torrential downpours, flooding the shallow wadis that are dry the rest of the year and impeding transportation. Little of the rainwater is saved for irrigation or drinking. However, there are numerous natural springs in the northern part of Bahrain and on adjacent islands. Underground freshwater deposits also extend beneath the Persian Gulf to the Saudi Arabian coast. Since ancient times, these springs have attracted settlers to the archipelago. Despite increasing salinization, the springs remain an important source of drinking water for Bahrain. Since the early 1980s, however, desalination plants, which render seawater suitable for domestic and industrial use, have provided about 60% of daily water consumption needs.

Climate data for Bahrain International Airport (1991–2020, extremes 1946–2012)
Month	Jan	Feb	Mar	Apr	May	Jun	Jul	Aug	Sep	Oct	Nov	Dec	Year
Record high °C (°F)	31.7 (89.1)	34.7 (94.5)	40.0 (104.0)	41.7 (107.1)	46.7 (116.1)	46.6 (115.9)	47.4 (117.3)	45.7 (114.3)	45.5 (113.9)	42.8 (109.0)	37.2 (99.0)	30.6 (87.1)	47.4 (117.3)
Mean daily maximum °C (°F)	20.7 (69.3)	22.0 (71.6)	25.5 (77.9)	30.6 (87.1)	36.1 (97.0)	38.6 (101.5)	39.7 (103.5)	39.6 (103.3)	37.7 (99.9)	34.0 (93.2)	28.0 (82.4)	22.9 (73.2)	31.3 (88.3)
Daily mean °C (°F)	17.5 (63.5)	18.4 (65.1)	21.3 (70.3)	26.0 (78.8)	31.1 (88.0)	34.0 (93.2)	35.1 (95.2)	35.1 (95.2)	33.2 (91.8)	29.9 (85.8)	24.6 (76.3)	19.7 (67.5)	27.2 (81.0)
Mean daily minimum °C (°F)	14.5 (58.1)	15.4 (59.7)	18.1 (64.6)	22.4 (72.3)	27.2 (81.0)	30.0 (86.0)	31.4 (88.5)	31.5 (88.7)	29.5 (85.1)	26.4 (79.5)	21.6 (70.9)	16.8 (62.2)	23.7 (74.7)
Record low °C (°F)	−5 (23)	7.2 (45.0)	7.8 (46.0)	14.2 (57.6)	18.7 (65.7)	22.7 (72.9)	25.2 (77.4)	26.0 (78.8)	23.5 (74.3)	18.8 (65.8)	12.1 (53.8)	6.4 (43.5)	−5 (23)
Average precipitation mm (inches)	18.1 (0.71)	13.0 (0.51)	14.7 (0.58)	5.8 (0.23)	0.5 (0.02)	0.0 (0.0)	0.0 (0.0)	0.0 (0.0)	0.0 (0.0)	0.9 (0.04)	16.8 (0.66)	15.2 (0.60)	85.1 (3.35)
Average precipitation days (≥ 1.0 mm)	2.5	1.9	2.5	1.3	0.3	0.0	0.0	0.0	0.0	0.2	1.6	2.3	12.6
Average relative humidity (%)	69.1	67.2	61.5	54.4	47.6	46.2	50.7	58.0	59.2	62.3	63.6	68.7	59.0
Average dew point °C (°F)	11.5 (52.7)	11.8 (53.2)	13.1 (55.6)	15.8 (60.4)	17.9 (64.2)	19.9 (67.8)	22.5 (72.5)	25.0 (77.0)	23.7 (74.7)	21.5 (70.7)	17.0 (62.6)	13.7 (56.7)	17.7 (63.9)
Mean monthly sunshine hours	231.5	220.6	245.1	256.3	316.4	343.7	336.6	334.1	315.9	306.0	249.0	235.4	3,390.4
Source: NOAA

=== Climate change ===
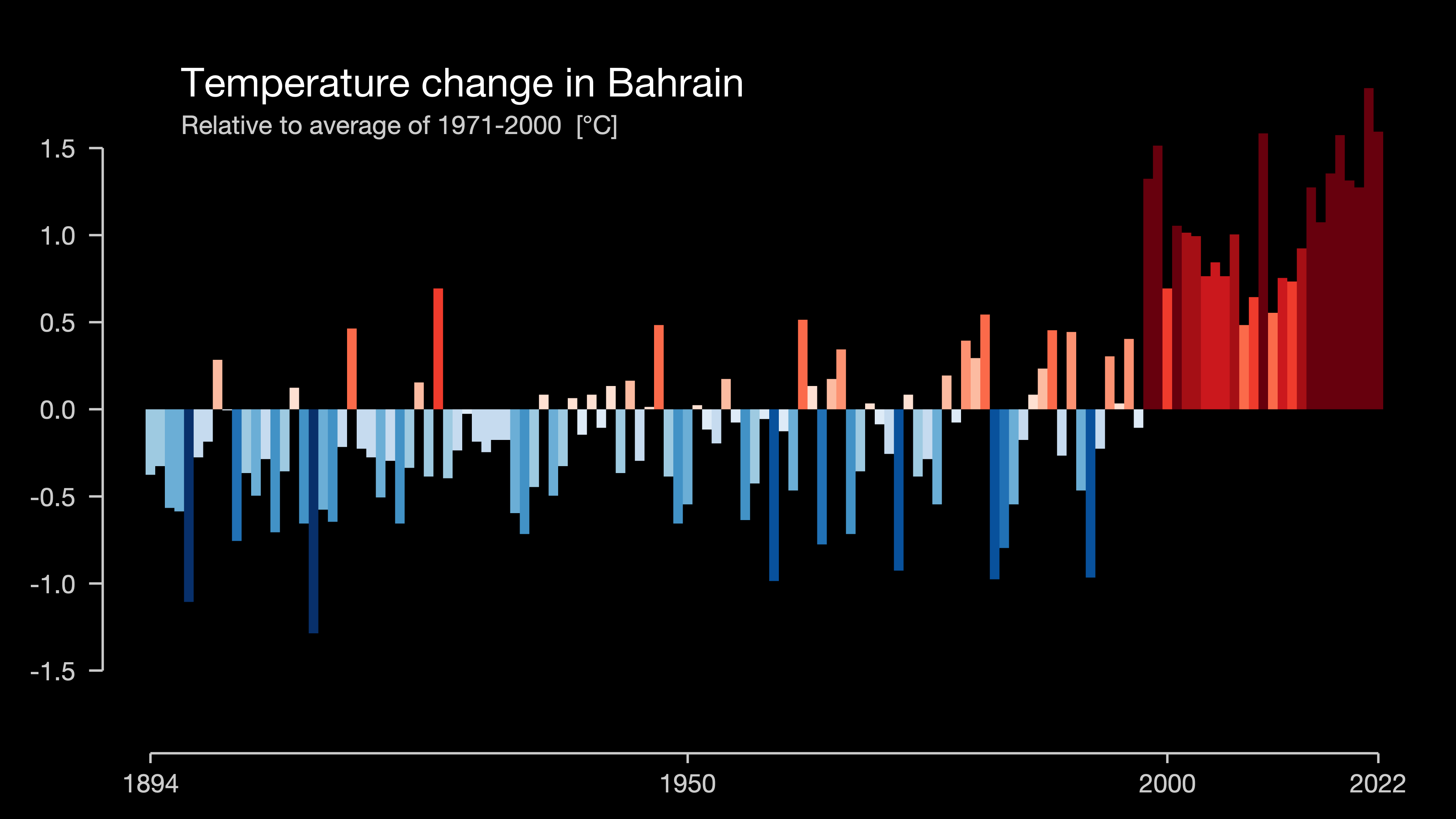
Temperature change in Bahrain, each bar represents the average temperature over that year.

Due to climate change Bahrain is experiencing more frequent extreme heat, drought, flooding and dust storms and the threat of sea level rise. These conditions threaten Bahrain's food and water security, and are expected to become more severe in the future. Despite being a relatively low-emitting country overall, Bahrain was the second highest greenhouse gas emitter per capita in 2023, at approximately 42 tonnes per person. Most of Bahrain's emissions arise from burning fossil fuels in the energy sector. The nation has committed to net zero by 2060 and also aims to reduce its greenhouse gas emissions by 30% by 2035.

== Area and boundaries ==
Area:
total:780 km^{2}
country comparison to the world: 188

- land:780 km^{2}
- water: 0 km^{2}

Area comparative

- USA – 3.5 times the size of Washington D.C.

Land boundaries: 0 km

Coastline: 161 km

Maritime claims:

- territorial sea: 12 nmi (22.2 km; 13.8 mi)
- contiguous zone: 24 nmi (44.4 km; 27.6 mi)
- continental shelf: extending to boundaries to be determined

Elevation extremes:

- lowest point: Persian Gulf 0 m
- highest point: Jabal ad Dukhan 122 m

Maritime neighbours:

- Iran
- Qatar
- Saudi Arabia

== Resources and land use ==
Bahrain is the eleventh most water stressed country in the world.

Natural resources:

- oil, associated and non associated natural gas, fish, pearls

Land use:

- arable land: 2.11%
- permanent crops: 3.95%
- other: 93.95% (2012)

Irrigated land: 40.15 km^{2} (2003)

Total renewable water resources: 0.12 m³ (2011)

Freshwater withdrawal (domestic/industrial/agricultural):

- total: 0.36 km^{3}/yr (50%/6%/45%)
- per capita: 386 m³/yr (2003)

== Environmental concerns ==
Natural hazards:
periodic droughts; dust storms

Environment – current issues:
desertification resulting from the degradation of limited arable land, periods of drought, and dust storms; coastal degradation (damage to coastlines, coral reefs, and sea vegetation) resulting from oil spills and other discharges from large tankers, oil refineries, and distribution stations; lack of freshwater resources (groundwater and seawater are the only sources for all water needs)

Environment – international agreements:
party to: Biodiversity, Climate Change-Kyoto Protocol, Desertification, Hazardous Wastes, Law of the Sea, Ozone Layer Protection, Wetlands

== See also ==
- Wikimedia Atlas of Bahrain
- List of islands of Bahrain
