= Northern Governorate =

Governorate of Bahrain

Coordinates: 26°07′N 50°29′E

Northern Governorate المحافظة الشمالية Muḥāfaẓat aš-Šamālīyah
- Governorate
- Flag

- Map of Bahrain showing Northern Governorate
- Country: Bahrain

Government
  - Governor: Ali bin Al Shaikh Abdulhussain Al Asfoor

Area
  - Total: 145.73 km^{2} (56.27 sq mi)

Population (2020 Census)
  - Total: 379,637
  - Density: 2,605.1/km^{2} (6,747.1/sq mi)
- Time zone: UTC+3 (Arabia Standard Time)

The Northern Governorate (Arabic: المحافظة الشمالية, romanized: Al-Muḥāfaẓat aš-Šamālīyah) is one of the four governorates of Bahrain. It includes parts of the former municipalities of Al Mintaqah al Gharbiyah, Al Mintaqah al Wusta, Al Mintaqah al Shamaliyah, Jidd Haffs and Madinat Hamad. It also includes the island of Umm an Nasan.

== Settlements in the Northern Governorate ==
- A'ali
- Abu Saiba
- Al Hajar
- Al Lawzi
- Al Markh
- Al Qadam
- Al Qala
- Al Safiria
- Bani Jamra
- Barbar
- Budaiya
- Buquwa
- Buri
- Dar Kulaib
- Diraz
- Dumistan
- Hamad Town
- Hamala
- Hillat Abdul Saleh
- Jablat Habshi
- Janabiya
- Jannusan
- Jasra
- Jid Al-Haj
- Jidda Island
- Karrana
- Karzakan
- Malikiya
- Meqsha
- Muqaba
- North Sehla
- Northern City
- Nurana Islands
- Qurayya
- Saar
- Sadad
- Salmabad
- Shahrakan
- Shakhura
- Umm an Nasan
- Umm as Sabaan
- Zayed Town

== Education ==
The Japanese School in Bahrain is located in Sar in the governorate.

== See also ==
- Al Garum Islands
