= Abu Saiba =

Abu Saiba أبوصيبع
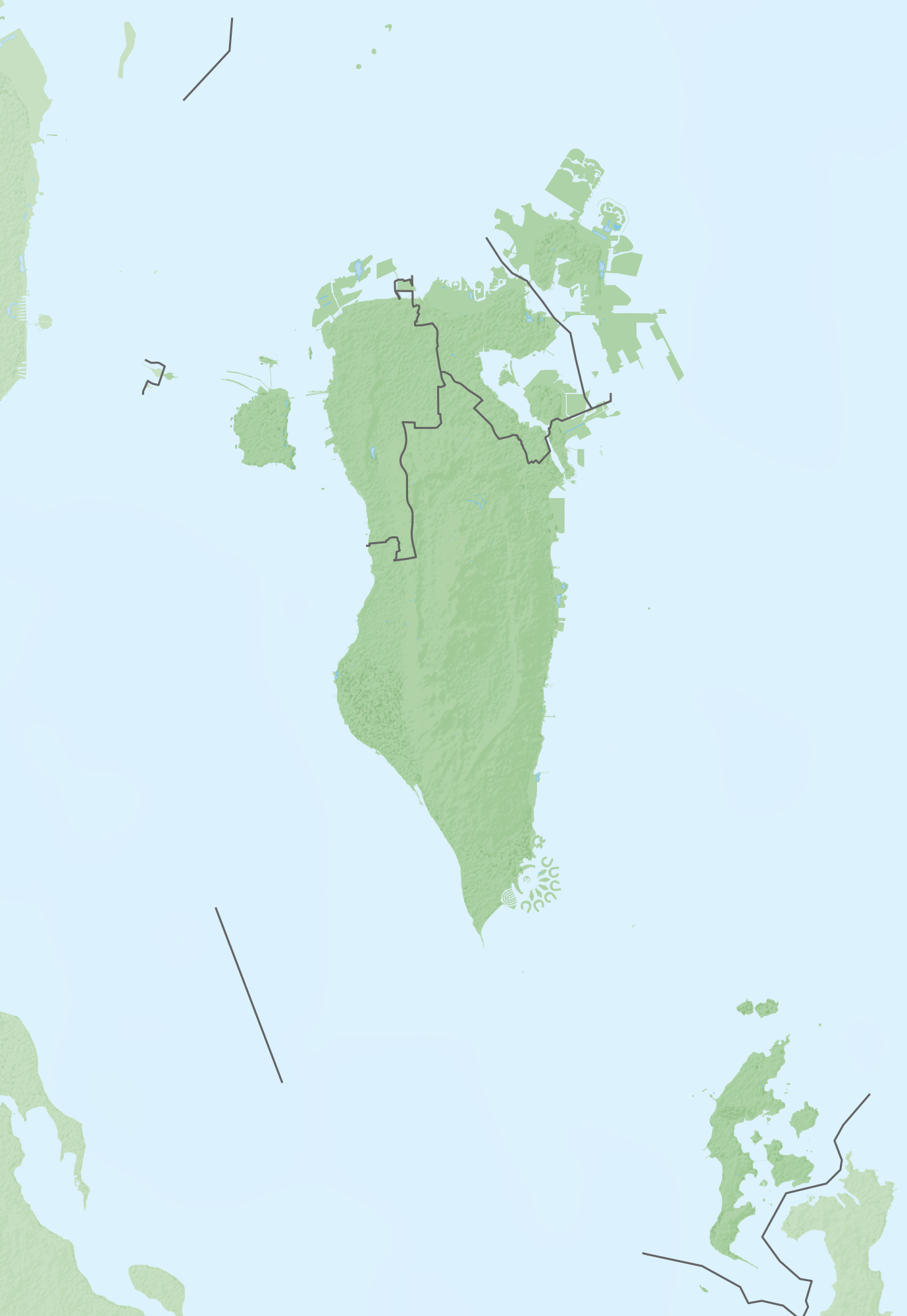
- Location in Bahrain
- Coordinates: 26°13′2″N 50°30′15″E
- Country: Bahrain
- Governorate: Northern Governorate

Area
  - Total: 0.8 km^{2} (0.31 sq mi)
- Highest elevation: 11 m (36 ft)
- Lowest elevation: 4 m (13 ft)

Population
  - Estimate (2023): 9,000
- Postal codes: 469, 471, 473, 475

Abu Saiba is a Village located in the Northern Governorate of Bahrain, situated on Al-Budaiya Highway, 8 kilometers west of the capital city, Manama. It is surrounded by the villages of Shakhoora to the south, Al Hajar to the east, and Muqaba to the west.

== History ==
Historically, Abu Saiba has been a farming village with a notable handmade textile industry. However, the village's farmland has experienced significant shrinkage due to various environmental and economic factors. Despite these changes, the village retains its charm with numerous old houses scattered across its traditional narrow lanes and corridors.

== Notable Sites ==
Abu Saiba's Husayniyya (Arabic: حسينية أبوصيبع) is a famous religious place in the Village. This site hosts various religious events and underwent significant renovations in January 2007. The renovation transformed the old building into a new structure that can accommodate up to two thousand people at one time. The Husayniyya has since become a tourist attraction, drawing many visitors to the village.

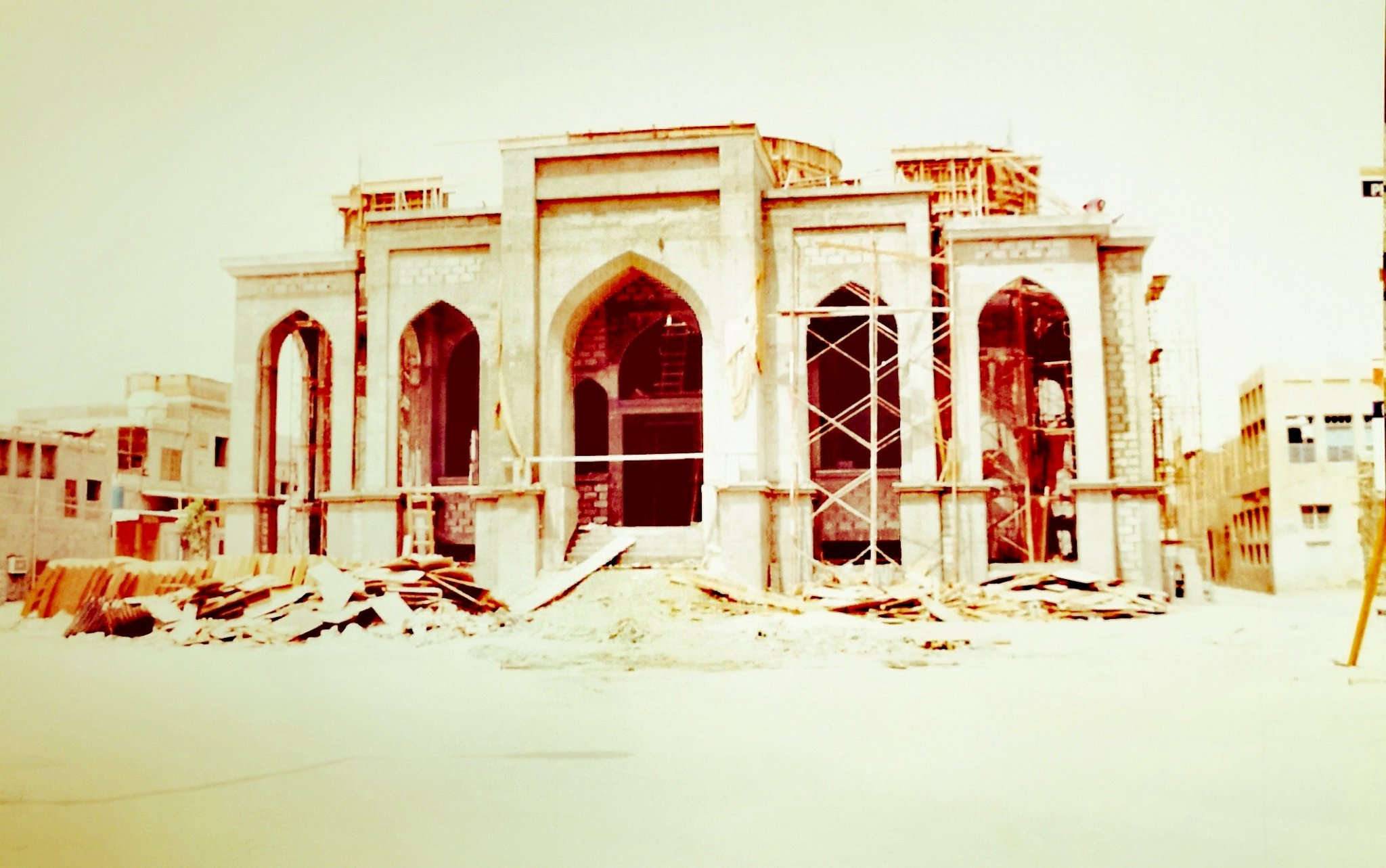
Abu Saiba's Husayniyya under construction (2004)
