= 30th century BC in architecture =

== Buildings and structures ==
=== Buildings ===
- Alvastra pile-dwelling – circa 3000 BC in Neolithic Scandinavia
- Barbar Temple – oldest of the three temples built in 3000 BC, in present-day Bahrain
- Diraz Temple – circa 3rd millennium BC, in present-day Bahrain
- Tepe Sialk – claimed to be the world's oldest ziggurat built in 3000 BC, in present-day Iran

== See also ==
- 29th century BC
- 29th century BC in architecture
- Timeline of architecture
