= Barbar, Bahrain =

Barbar باربار
- Village
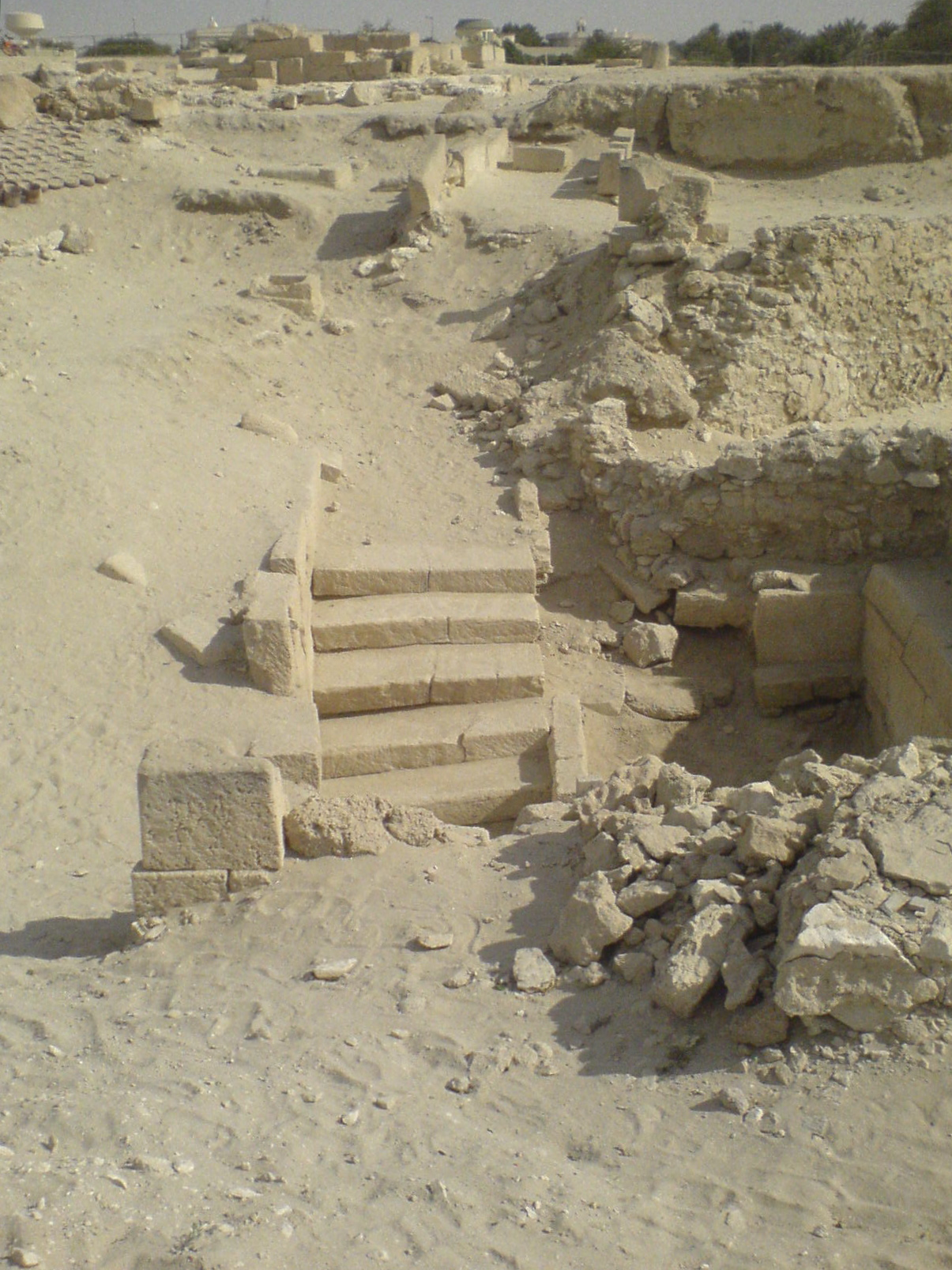
- Barbar Temple ruins

- Location in Bahrain
- Coordinates: 26°13′46″N 50°28′50″E
- Country: Bahrain
- Governorate: Northern Governorate
- Website: barbaronline.com

Barbar (Arabic: باربار) is a village in the north of Bahrain. Situated in the Northern Governorate, it lies between the villages of Diraz and Jannusan, along the Budaiya highway.

The Dilmun era Barbar Temple is in the village and is on the tentative list of UNESCO World Heritage Sites.

== See also ==
- List of cities in Bahrain
