= E. C. L. During Caspers =

Dutch archaeologist

- Born: 1 September 1934; Amsterdam, Netherlands
- Died: 31 January 1996 (aged 61); Leiden, Netherlands
- Occupation: Archaeologist

Academic background
- Education: University of Amsterdam (BA; MA, 1962); Institute of Archaeology (PhD, 1969)
- Thesis: Archaeological Evidence for Maritime Trade in the Persian Gulf in the Third Millennium BC (1969)
- Doctoral advisor: Seton Lloyd

Academic work
- Discipline: Archaeology
- Sub-discipline: Near Eastern archaeology; South Asian archaeology
- Institutions: Leiden University

Elisabeth Christina Louisa During Caspers (1 September 1934 – 31 January 1996), known familiarly as Inez During Caspers, was a Dutch archaeologist.

== Education and career ==
During Caspers was born in Amsterdam in 1934. She studied both Mesopotamian and South Asian archaeology at the University of Amsterdam, graduating with an MA in Sumerian and prehistoric archaeology in 1962. She then went on to the Institute of Archaeology in London, where she completed her PhD in 1969. Her thesis, supervised by Seton Lloyd, was on maritime trade between Mesopotamia and the Indus Valley in prehistory.

In 1973, after spending several years working in the manuscript room of the University of Amsterdam library, During Caspers was appointed a lecturer at the Kern Institute of Indology at Leiden University. She remained at Leiden for the remainder of her career, taking a position at its newly-founded department of archaeology in 1986. She was the editor of the Annual Bibliography of Indian Archaeology (ABIA) for the years 1967–1969 and 1970–1972.

Suffering from cancer in her later years, During Caspers took early retirement in 1995. She began working on deciphering the Indus script, but the project she assembled was cut short by her death from heart failure in 1996.

== Fieldwork ==
During Caspers actively participated in fieldwork throughout her career. In 1966, she met Beatrice de Cardi, who was planning an expedition to Bampur in southwestern Iran. de Cardi invited During Caspers to join her small team as they attempted to relocate and re-excavate sites discovered by Aurel Stein in the 1930s. According to de Cardi's account, During Caspers' six-week stay was eventful. The team encountered outbreaks of both cholera and typhoid fever, and were stranded by car failures or fear of wolves on multiple occasions. During Caspers also received news of her father's death part way through the expedition, but stayed to help finish the work anyway. Just before she left the country, an Armenian workman who had become enamoured of During Caspers proposed to her, and had to be restrained from breaking down her hotel room door when she declined. Despite this "somewhat inconsiderate introduction to expedition life", During Caspers returned to Iran in 1970, joining C. C. Lamberg-Karlovsky's excavations at Tepe Yahya.

Her introduction to Arabian archaeology came in 1975, when she joined Michael Roaf's expedition to al-Markh in Bahrain. In 1976, she organised her own expedition to Pakistan, where she and J. C. M. H. Moloney conducted an extensive photographic survey of major sites and museum collections. In the late 1970s she also planned excavations at Saar in Bahrain, but was unable to raise the funds. She returned the Gulf a final time in 1994, joining Jocelyn and Jeffrey Orchard's Hajar Project. At the time of her death, she was planning to follow this up with her own excavations at Wadi Bahla.
