= 30th century BC =

One hundred years, from 3000 BC to 2901 BC

The 30th century BC was a time period that lasted from the year 3000 BC to 2901 BC.

== Events ==
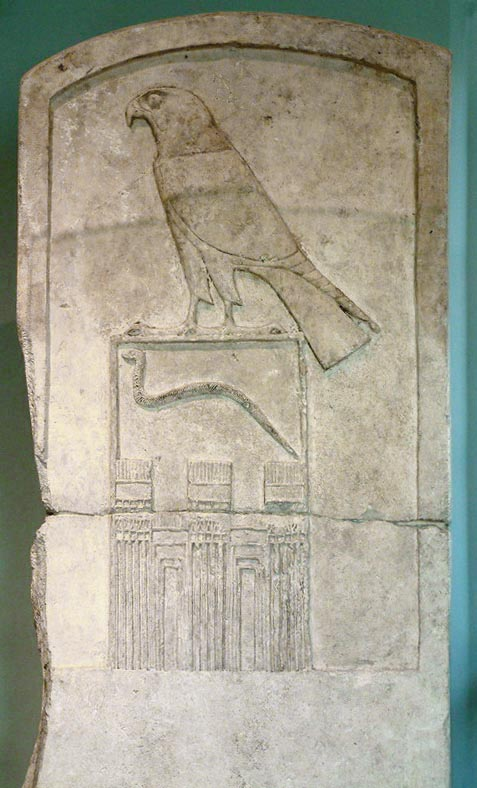
Stele bearing the name of Djet

- Before 3000 BC: An image of a deity (detail from a cong) recovered from Tomb 12 in Fanshan, Yuyao, Zhejiang, is made during the Neolithic period by the Liangzhu culture. It is now kept at Zhejiang Provincial Museum, Hangzhou.
- c. 3000 BC: Earliest remains from Aniba (Nubia).
- c. 3000 BC: Early agriculture in North Africa.
- c. 3300 BC – 2600 BC: Early Harappan period continues in the Indus Valley.
- c. 3000 BC: Camels are domesticated in Egypt.
- c. 3000 BC: There is an intense phase of burial at Duma na nGiall on the Hill of Tara, the ancient seat of the High King of Ireland.
- c. 3000 BC: Stonehenge begins to be built. In its first version, it consists of a circular ditch and bank, with 56 wooden posts.
- c. 3000 BC: Cycladic civilization in the Aegean Sea starts.
- c. 3000 BC: Helladic period starts.
- c. 3000 BC: Aegean Bronze Age starts.
- c. 3000 BC: Austronesian expansion begins.
- c. 3000 BC: Jawa, Jordan is founded along with the world's first known dam.
- c. 2990-2980 BC: Death of Egyptian First Dynasty pharaoh Djer.
- c. 2970 BC: Death of Egyptian pharaoh Djet.
- c. 2930 BC: Death of Egyptian pharaoh Den.
- c. 2920 BC: Death of Egyptian pharaoh Anedjib.
- c. 2920 BC: Troy is founded on this date (assuming the interpretation of Manfred Korfmann is followed).
- c. 2910 BC: Death of Egyptian pharaoh Semerkhet.
- c. 2900+ BC Prometheus would have sprouted in this century.

== Inventions, discoveries, introductions ==
- 3000–2000 BC – Hieroglyphic writing in Ancient Egypt, potter's wheel in China, first pottery in the Americas (in modern Ecuador).
- c. 3000 BC – Sumerians establish cities.
- c. 3000 BC – Sumerians start to work in various metals.
- c. 3000 BC – Knowledge of Ancient Near Eastern grains appears in Ancient China.
- 3000–2000 BC – Settled villages are widespread in Mesoamerica.
- The shekal was introduced in Mesopotamia as a monetary and weight unit; see ancient weights and measures, Shekel.
- The Sydney rock engravings date from around 3000 BC (modern Sydney, Australia).

== Architecture ==
- 30th century BC in architecture
