= Al Qadam =

Village in Northern Governorate, Bahrain

Coordinates: 26°13′N 50°31′E

Al Qadam القدم
- Village
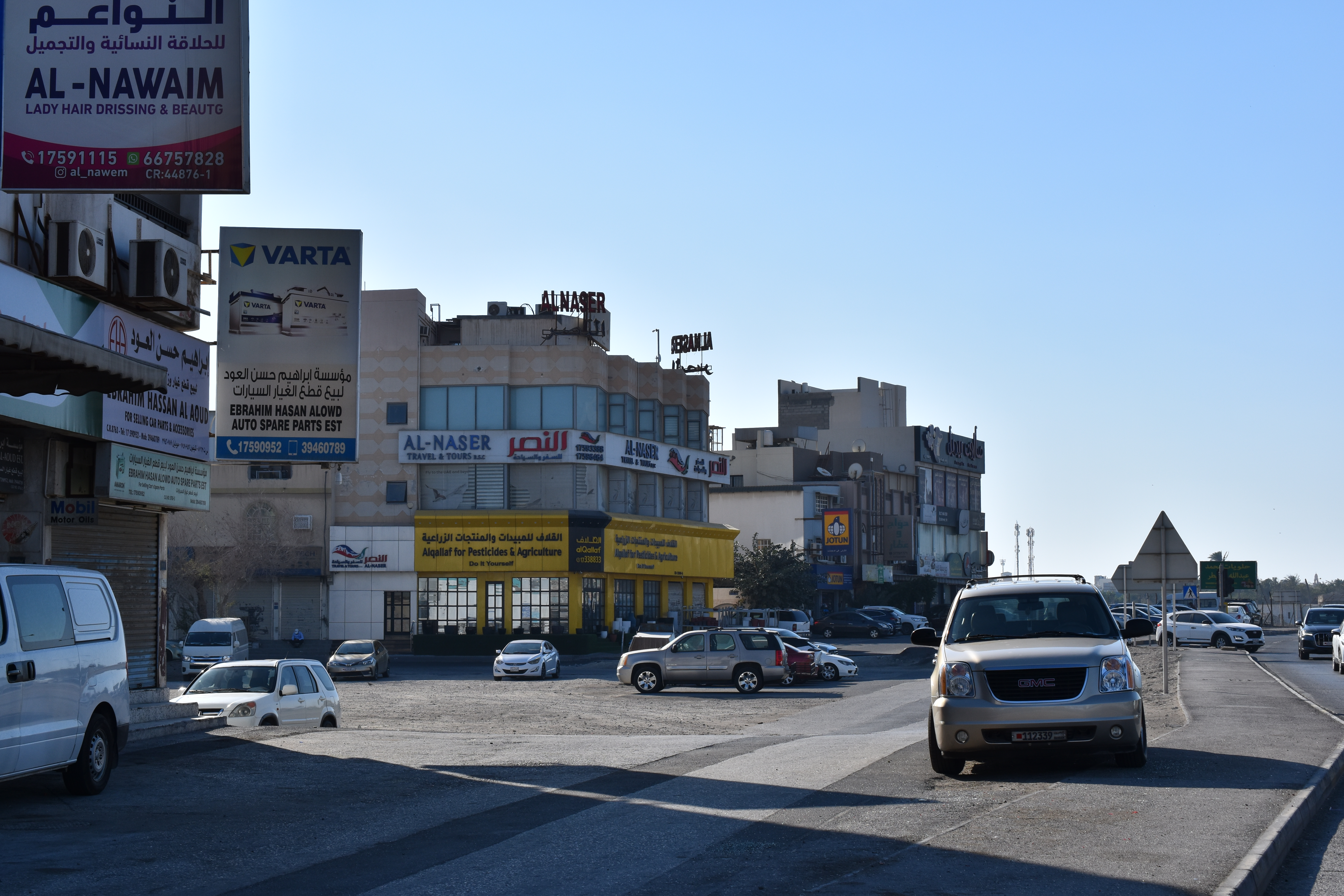

- Location within Bahrain
- Country: Bahrain
- Governorate: Northern

Al Qadam is a village in the Northern Governorate of Bahrain.

== History ==
The village is the site of an ancient burial mound which could potentially be a World Heritage Site after the country's Ministry of Culture nominated it to UNESCO. The village was home to Bahrain's oldest herbal products producer, the Al Kamel Factory, which was established in the village in 1855. The factory had to be relocated from the village in order to expand its production capabilities and to meet national and regional demands. In 2008, amidst the Jyllands-Posten Muhammad cartoons controversy, hundreds of people staged a protest in the village, calling on the Bahraini government to take action against Denmark. The country's parliament issued a statement condemning the cartoons.

== Politics ==
The village lies under constituency two of the Northern Governorate administrative region. It is currently represented in the Chamber of Deputies by Sawsan Taqawi, who also represents the villages of Jannusan and Karrana.

== Infrastructure ==
The village contains a culture and sport centre, a local charity fund and a matam. The village also is the site of multiple housing projects.

== Notable people ==
- Majeed Al Alawi, the former Minister of Labour, was born in the village in 1955.
