= Diraz Temple =

Archaeological site in Bahrain

Diraz Temple معبد الدراز
- Location in Bahrain
- Coordinates: 26°13′01.4″N 50°28′28.4″E

The Diraz Temple (also referred to as Duraz Temple, Maabet al Diraz, Daraz Temple, Arabic: معبد الدراز) is located on the side of Budaiya Highway, in the village of Diraz in Bahrain. No concrete evidence has been found to determine which god(s) the temple was dedicated for.

The architectural characteristics are unique not only in Bahrain (see Barbar Temple for comparison), but also when compared to Mesopotamian or Indus Valley temple sites from a similar era.

== History ==
Diraz Temple dates to circa 3rd millennium BCE based on the recovered artifacts from the site among which are a snake vessel, Barbar potteries, and two Dilmun seals with animal figures.

The site was excavated by the British Archaeological Mission in cooperation with the Directorate of Archaeology in the 1970s.

== Archaeological remains ==
Diraz Temple Site

The temple was carried by the cylindrical columns with the diameter of 120 cm. The 60 cm high remains of the columns are placed 2 to 3 m apart from each other. In between them stands a square base which could be an altar or a statue base. In the middle of cella one can see the remains of a sacrificial altar and the remains of two other rooms with uncertain functions. To the West, a damaged grave dating to 2nd millennium BCE has been found with the remains of a human body.

== See also ==
- List of archaeological sites in Bahrain
- Culture of Bahrain
