= Nurana Islands =

Islands in Bahrain

- Location within Bahrain

Geography
- Location: Persian Gulf
- Coordinates: 26.25°N 50.50°E
- Archipelago: Bahrain
- Adjacent to: Persian Gulf
- Total islands: 2
- Major islands: North Nurana; South Nurana
- Area: 2.32 km^{2} (0.90 sq mi)
- Highest elevation: 0 m (0 ft)

Administration
- Bahrain
- Governorate: Northern Governorate
- Largest settlement: Construction camp (pop. 2)

Demographics
- Demonym: Bahraini
- Population: 2 (2010)
- Pop. density: 1/km^{2} (3/sq mi)
- Ethnic groups: Bahraini, non-Bahraini

Additional information
- Time zone: AST (UTC+3)
- ISO code: BH-17
- Official website: www.housing.gov.bh/en/ProjectsDocument/Almadeena%20Alshmalya.pdf

Nurana Islands are a group of 2 artificial islands to the east of Northern City in the archipelago of Bahrain, which lie 9 km (5.6 mi) west of the capital, Manama, on Bahrain Island.

== Description ==
The proposed plan for the city was made in 2000, and they are part of the Northern City. It is a residential area that is being reclaimed and constructed by the Ministry of Housing in Bahrain. North Nurana is designated for more upscale villas, while South Nurana is more medium class. The islands were recently cleaned from debris.

== Administration ==
The islands belongs to Northern Governorate.

== Transportation ==
There is one causeways connecting South Nurana with Bahrain Island:

- Jid al Haj Bridge

A future causeway called the Gulf Drive will connect the Nurana islands to Muharraq Island through all reclaimed islands in the north.

== Image gallery ==
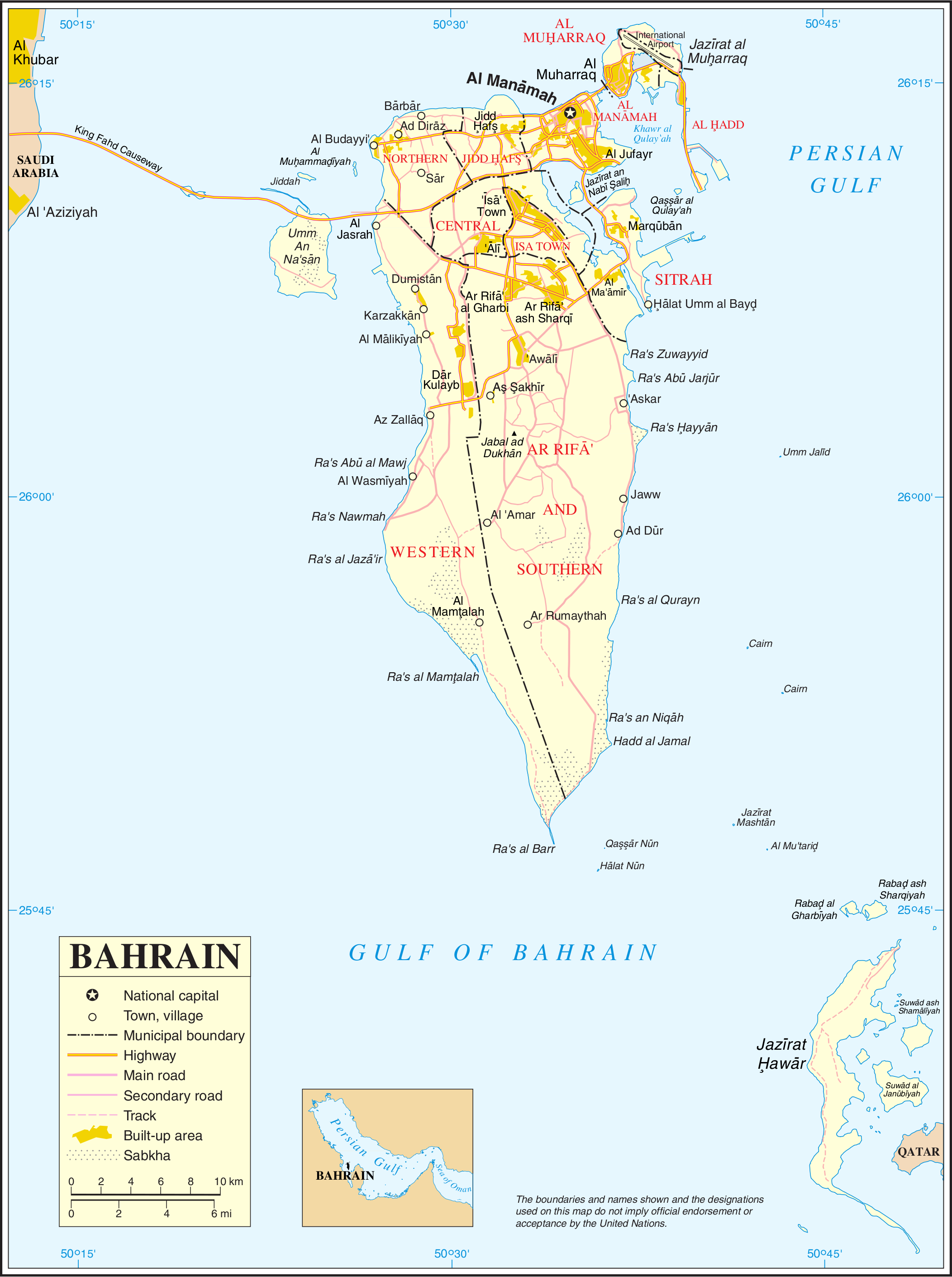
Map 1

District Map

== See also ==
- List of islands of Bahrain
