= Al Garum Islands =

Group of islands in Bahrain

- Location within Bahrain

Geography
- Location: Persian Gulf
- Coordinates: 26.40°N 50.50°E
- Archipelago: Bahrain
- Adjacent to: Persian Gulf
- Total islands: 4
- Major islands: Fasht Al Garum
- Area: 0.4 km^{2} (0.15 sq mi)
- Highest elevation: 0 m (0 ft)

Administration
- Bahrain
- Governorate: Northern Governorate
- Largest settlement: Fasht Al Garum (pop. 0)

Demographics
- Demonym: Bahraini
- Population: 0 (2016)
- Pop. density: 0/km^{2} (0/sq mi)
- Ethnic groups: Bahraini, non-Bahraini

Additional information
- Time zone: AST (UTC+3)
- ISO code: BH-14
- Official website: www.bahrain.com

Al Garum Islands are the northernmost group of islands of Bahrain. They lie 23 km (14 mi) north of the capital, Manama, on Bahrain Island.

== Geography ==
There are 4 islands in this reef, and a curved channel was dredged to reach the main island.

== Administration ==
The island belongs to Northern Governorate.

== Transportation ==
The island might be the location of a new Army airfield.

== Flora and fauna ==
The island is known for its rich fish life.

== Image gallery ==
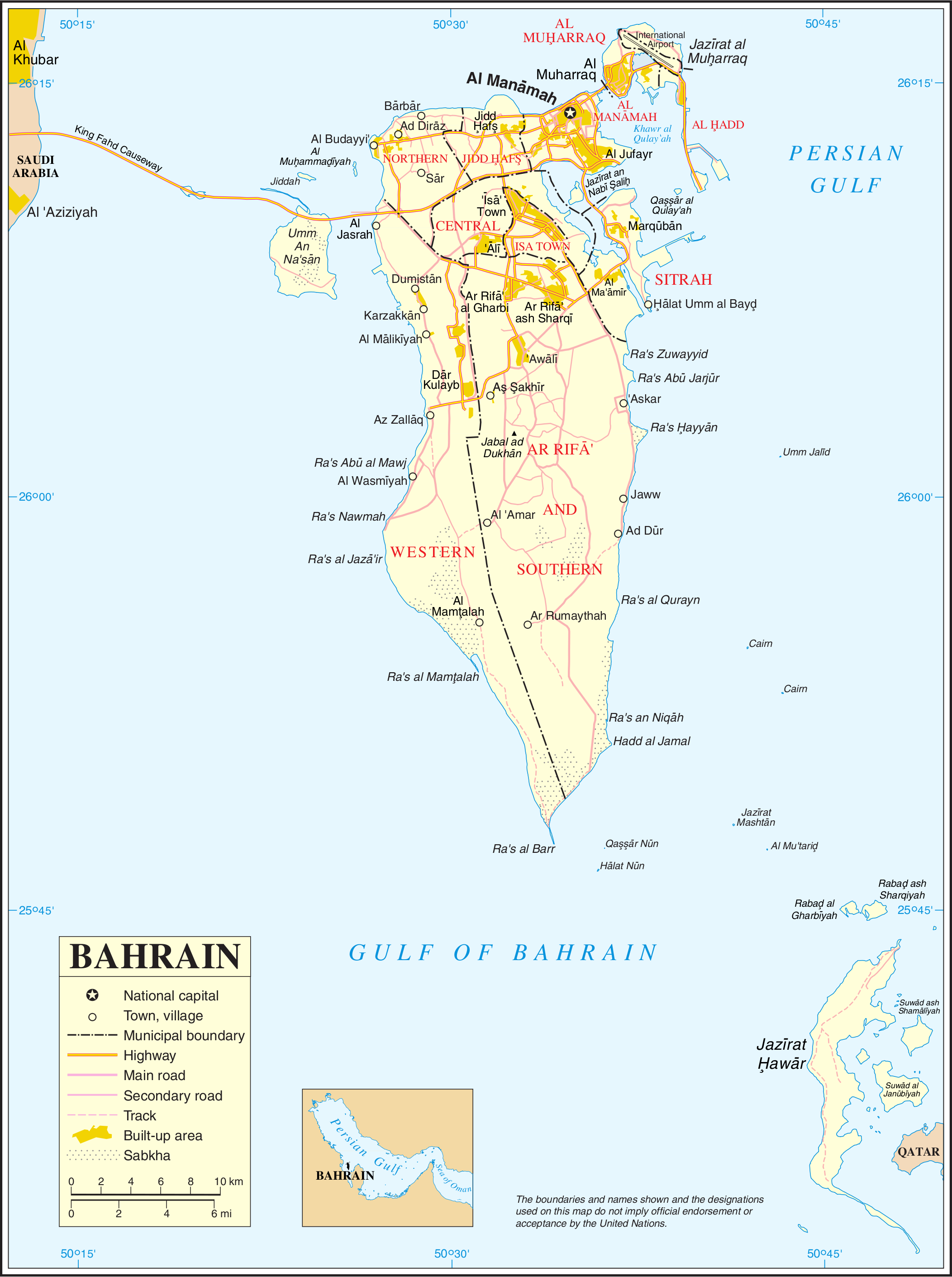
Map 1

District Map

== See also ==
- List of islands of Bahrain
