= Buri, Bahrain =

Village in Northern Governorate, Bahrain

Coordinates: 26°09′N 50°30′E

Buri (Arabic: بوري, sometimes transliterated as Boori) is a village located in the Kingdom of Bahrain. The village is said to be one of the oldest in the country.

== Geography ==
It is situated in the Northern Governorate administrative region. The village itself lies west of the town of A'ali.

== History ==
According to J. G. Lorimer's 1908 Gazetteer of the Persian Gulf, Buri was a village located 7 miles southwest of Manama surrounded by date plantations with a few stone houses and 150 huts populated by the Baharna, all being date farmers. There were around 30 donkeys and cattle in the village with an estimated 10,500 date palms.

== Sport ==
Buri has its own sports club and participates in football tournaments.
