= Dumistan =

Dumistan دمستان
- Village
- Dumistan within Kingdom of Bahrain
- Coordinates: 26.124°N 50.468°E
- Country: Kingdom of Bahrain
- Governorate: Northern Governorate

Dumistan (Arabic: دمستان) or Dabistan (Persian: دبستان) is a coastal village situated on the western shore of Bahrain. It is situated to the north of Karzakan and west of Hamad Town, in the Northern Governorate administrative region of the country.

== Etymology ==
There are two possible roots for the village's name.

The first is that it originates in the term "Dabistan" (Persian: دبستان, romanized: dabistaan) and is therefore and alteration of it, the term "Dabistan" (دبستان) is a Persian word that typically means "school" or "place of learning".

- Dab (دب) refers to "learning" or "education".
- -stan (اِستان) is a suffix meaning "place" or "land of".

So, Dabistan can be understood as "the place of learning" or simply "a school".

It is also possibly the former location of Al-Ittihad school (Persian: دبستان اتحاد ملی, romanized: Dabistan Ittihad Melli, lit. 'National Union Primary School'), although the remains of the school are in Manimal (possibly got relocated to Manama before being shut down in 1996).

The other purposed origin is that it means Persian: دُم استان, romanized: dumistan, lit. 'Tail land', although this is not supported by any major sources.

== Housing Facilities ==
1. In 1983, the old Dumistan housing project (Phase One) was established.
2. In 2001, the new Dumistan housing project (Phase Two) was established.
3. In 2009, a new housing project was created east of the new housing units (Phase Three and final).

== Institutions ==
- Dumistan Charity Fund
- Dumistan Cultural and Sports Center
- Youth Committee
- Community Committee
- Ahlulbayt Cultural and Social Forum
- Abu Ramana Islamic Center

== Mosques ==
- Sheikh Mohammed Abu Ramana Mosque
- Imam Al-Ridha Mosque
- Al-Rawda Mosque (under construction)
- Imam Al-Mahdi Mosque
- Sheikh Ibrahim Al-Wasiti Mosque (demolished and rebuilt)
- Imam Al-Hussein Mosque (known as the Scholar Mosque)
- Dumistan Housing Mosque (known as Imam Al-Jawad Mosque)
- Al-Waqi Mosque, south of Balqis School.
