= Max Thornburg =

Max Weston Thornburg (October 10, 1892 – September 21, 1962) was an American petroleum executive and government adviser. He was a petroleum adviser to the United States Department of State and a senior oil executive for the Standard Oil of California (SOCAL) and California-Texas Oil Company, Ltd. (Caltex) in the Middle East including Bahrain and Iran. He was a special assistant to the Undersecretary of State from 1941 to 1943 during World War II.

== Early life and education ==
Thornburg was born in Long Beach, California to Eva Louise (née Holbrook) and Charles Hix Thornburg. He married Leila Baldwin Berry on March 30, 1918, in Lynchburg, Virginia. Leila's father, Rufus Albert Berry, was in the real estate business and also the postmaster in Berkeley, California.

Thornburg received a Bachelor of Arts degree from the University of California, Berkeley in 1917, and then a Bachelor of Science (1921), and a degree in chemical engineering (1933), both from UC Berkeley. He also did post-graduate work at the University of Grenoble in 1919. He served in the United States Army from 1917 to 1920, stationed at Camp Lewis, Washington, and in France. He was discharged with the rank of captain.

== Career ==
In June 1936 the Standard Oil Company of California (SOCAL; later Chevron) and the Texas Corporation (Texaco) formed a new entity called California-Texas Oil Company, Ltd. (CALTEX), to market and distribute the crude oil produced by SOCAL east of the Suez Canal and the refined products produced at their new refinery being built on Bahrain Island. Thornburg was named a vice-president of the new entity, CALTEX. James Andrew Moffett, II., was named the chairman, as well as a director, and Howard M. Herron was president. In the 1930s, the ruler of Bahrain lent Umm as Sabaan island as a gift to Thornburg. He cultivated the northern part of the island and lived with his wife there many months every year. In 1958, the Thornburgs returned the island.

Thornburg was named as a "special consultant on international petroleum matters," by Secretary of State Cordell Hull, in August 1941, to serve under Harold L. Ickes, Secretary of the Interior and defense oil coordinator. Thornburg was to keep Ickes informed of the international aspects and problems of petroleum, which was crucial to the war effort both overseas and domestically to keep supplies flowing.

Thornburg died in Santa Monica, California at age 69. He was survived by his wife, Leila (née Berry) Thornburg (September 21, 1893 – October 13, 1969). They had three children, Roann (1919–1983), Priscilla (1922–1988), and Russell (1927–1989).
