= Jid Al-Haj =

Coordinates: 26.234°N 50.501°E

Jid Al-Haj (Arabic: جِد الحاج, Jid Al-Hahj) is a village situated along the northern coastline of Bahrain.

== Name ==
The Bahraini historian and researcher Mohammed bin Ali Al-Tajer says in his book Aqd Al Lalali Fi Tarikh Awal that the word "Jid" means coast, so the word Jid Al-Haj means the Coast of the Hahj, i.e., a person who has performed the Hajj pilgrimage.

== Geography ==
The village is adjacent to the villages of Karrana and Jannusan. The public coastline along Jid Al-Haj has been highlighted by local lawmakers for preservation.

== Economy ==
The village also has its own charity fund.
