= Umm as Sabaan =

Island in Bahrain

Umm as Sabaan Island
Native name: جزيرة ام الصبان (Arabic) Nickname: Al Mohammediya
- Location within Bahrain

Geography
- Location: Persian Gulf
- Coordinates: 26.20°N 50.436°E
- Archipelago: Bahrain
- Adjacent to: Persian Gulf
- Total islands: 1
- Major islands: Umm as Sabaan
- Area: 0.18 km^{2} (0.069 sq mi)
- Length: 0.9 km (0.56 mi)
- Width: 0.28 km (0.174 mi)
- Coastline: 2.5 km (1.55 mi)
- Highest elevation: 5 m (16 ft)

Administration
- Bahrain
- Governorate: Northern Governorate
- Largest settlement: Umm as Sabaan (pop. 10)

Demographics
- Demonym: Bahraini
- Population: 3 (2016)
- Pop. density: 16.6/km^{2} (43/sq mi)
- Ethnic groups: Bahraini, non-Bahraini

Additional information
- Time zone: AST (UTC+3)
- ISO code: BH-14
- Official website: www.bahrain.com

Umm as Sabaan (Arabic: ام الصبان) is an islet in Bahrain. It lies off the north western corner of Bahrain Island, near Budaiya village, and east of Jidda Island, located in the Persian Gulf. It is 15 km (9.3 mi) west of the capital, Manama, on Bahrain Island.

== History ==
The island was privately owned by Sheikh Mohammed bin Salman Al Khalifa, an uncle of the present King, Hamad bin Isa al Khalifa, and brother of Prime Minister Khalifa bin Salman Al Khalifa. Sheikh Mohammed renamed the island after himself as Al Mohammediya (Arabic: المحمدية).

In the 1930s, the ruler of Bahrain lent the island as a gift to Max Thornburg, an American oil executive from Caltex. He cultivated the northern part of the island and lived there with his wife many months every year. In 1958, the Thornburgs returned the island.

== Administration ==
The island belongs to Northern Governorate.

== Image gallery ==
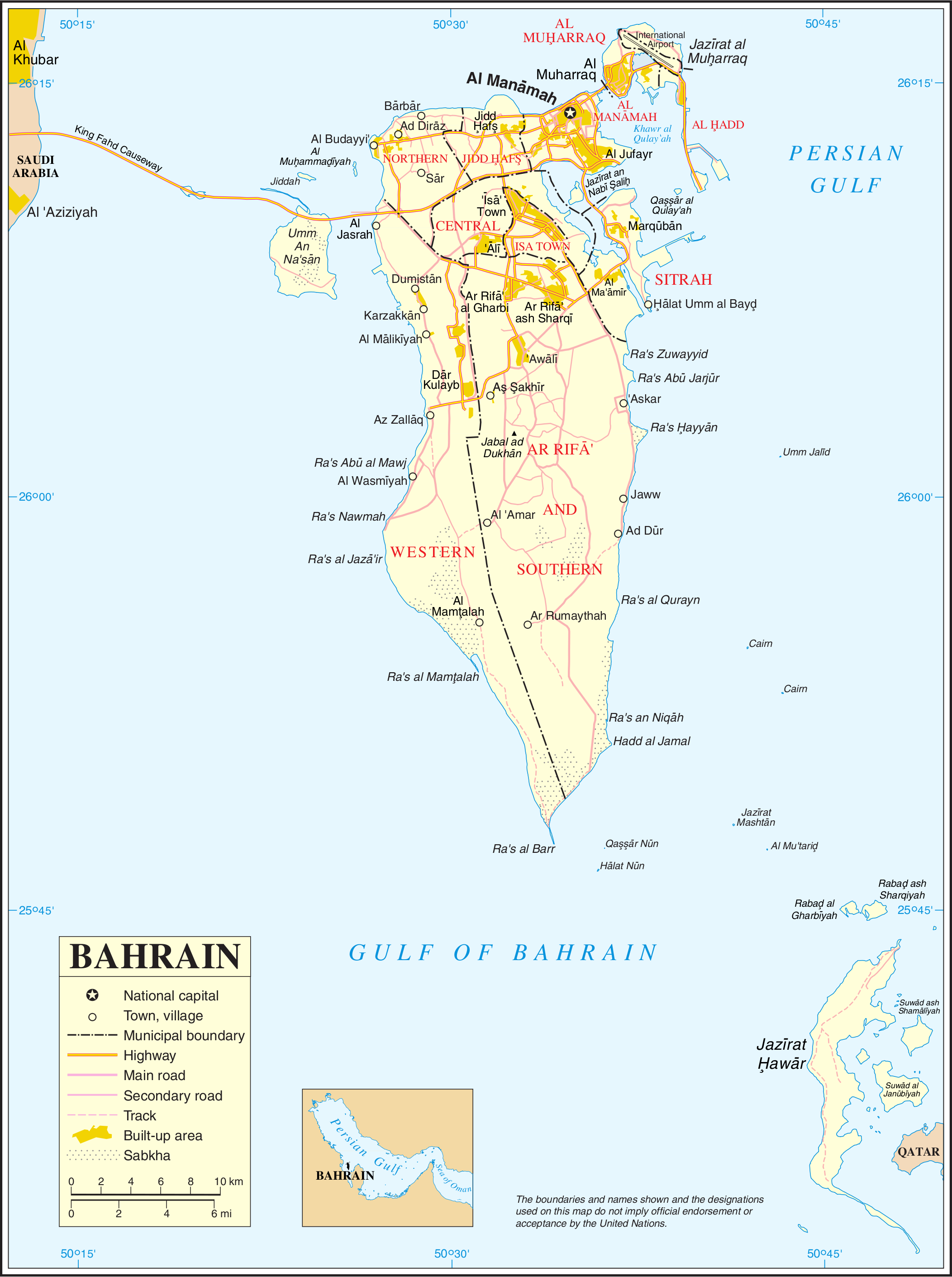
Map 1

District Map

== See also ==
- List of islands of Bahrain
