= Mountain of Smoke =

Mountain in Bahrain

- Jabal ad Dukhan
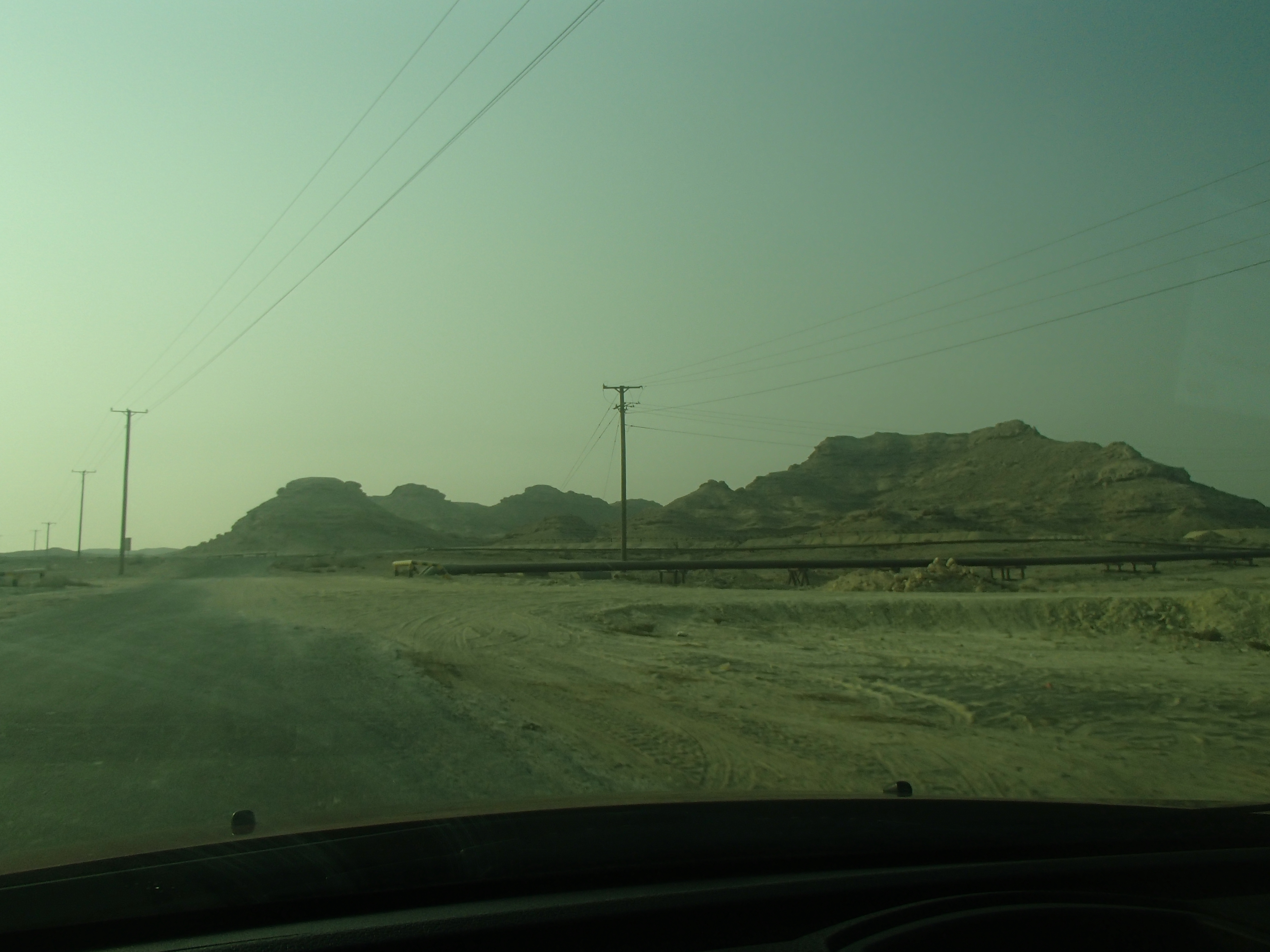
- Jabal ad Dukhan in 2016

Highest point
- Elevation: 134 m (440 ft)
- Prominence: 134 m (440 ft)
- Listing: Country high point
- Coordinates: 26°2′20″N 50°32′35″E

Naming
- Native name: جبل الدخان (Arabic)

Geography
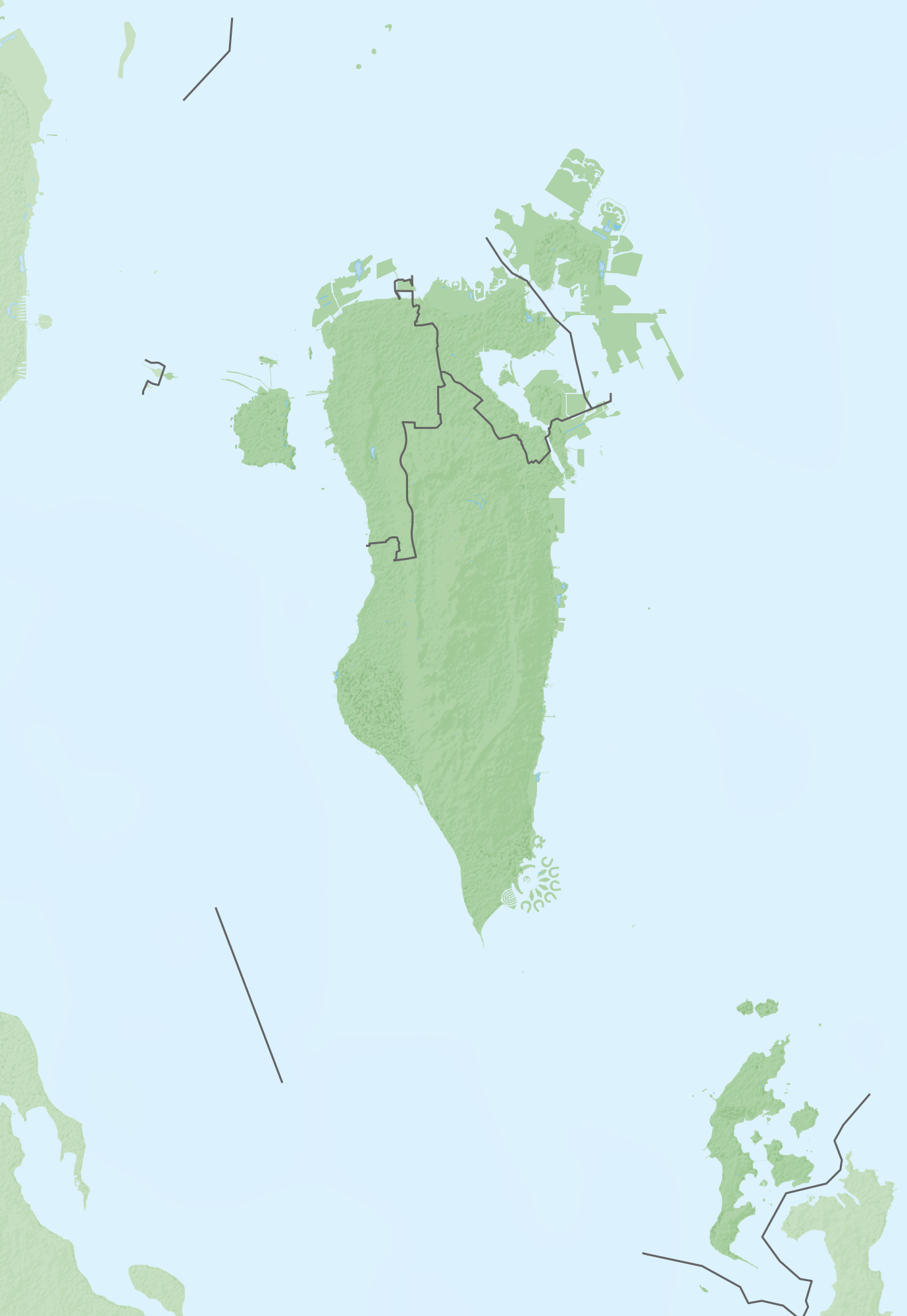
- Location within Bahrain Location within Persian Gulf
- Location: Bahrain

The Mountain of Smoke (Arabic: جبل الدخان, Jabal al Dukhan) is a hill in the Southern Governorate of Bahrain. At 134 m (440 ft) above mean sea level, it is the country's highest natural point, and was the highest point in the country until the completion of the 172 metres (564 ft) Almoayyed Tower in 2004.

== Etymology ==
The Mountain of Smoke is named as such because of the haze which often surrounds it on humid days. A number of caves of indeterminate type are in the vicinity of this mountain.

== History ==
Archaeological analysis estimated the first human habitation in Bahrain was centred around the hill, dating back to the late stone age (5000-3000 BC). Flint dating to the Stone Age has been found on and around the hill. Archaeological artifacts from the site have been put on display in the Bahrain National Museum.

Bitumen deposits at the base of the hill were first recorded by a surveyor of the Geological Survey of India in 1908, who noted local inhabitants dug a well to utilise butimenous limestone or asphalt alongside seven additional pits. Based on analysis of archaeological bitumen from various sites in Bahrain, research suggests that bitumen from the site was not used locally, and that bitumen on the island was primarily imported from Mesopotamia and Persia. A further survey of the site in 1928 by the American geologist Ralph Rhoades, on behalf of the Gulf Oil company, identified the bitumen pit again concluded to drill a test well at the site to find oil.

Oil was discovered in Bahrain in 1932, with the first oil well situated at the base of the hill by the Bahrain Petroleum Company (BAPCO). The oil town of Awali was constructed in 1934 shortly afterwards in close proximity to the hill.

During the 2026 Iran war, an Iranian ballistic missile strike targeted a radar station situation on top of the hill.

== See also ==
- Geography of Bahrain
