= Bu Quwah =

Bu Quwah بو قوة
- Village
- Bu Quwah within Kingdom of Bahrain
- Coordinates: 26.2°N 50.516667°E
- Country: Kingdom of Bahrain
- Governorate: Northern Governorate

Bu Quwah (Arabic: بو قوة, sometimes transliterated as Buquwa or Abu Quwah) is a small village situated in north-central Bahrain.

== Administration ==
It lies in constituency one of the Northern Governorate administrative region of the country. The most recent election in the constituency took place in the 2011 parliamentary by-election, with independent Ali Hassan Ali winning a seat in the lower house of Bahraini parliament.

== Infrastructure ==
In 2009, plans to construct a park in the village were announced as part of a greater beautification project by the governorate. A 37,803 sq mile housing project was launched in 2010. A power plant was said to be constructed.
