= Al Hajar, Bahrain =

Village in Northern Governorate, Bahrain

Coordinates: 26°13′N 50°31′E

Al Hajar (Arabic: الحجر) is a village in the Northern Governorate of the Kingdom of Bahrain, west of the village of Al Qadam and lines the Budaiya highway.

== History ==
Ancient relics were discovered in the village in 1988 and are believed to be from the Dilmun civilisation from 2300 BC. The village has its own youth football club.
