= Zayed City =

Development project in Abu Dhabi

Zayed City (Arabic: مَدِيْنَة زَايِد, romanized: Madīnat Zāyid), formerly "Abu Dhabi Capital District", is a construction project which will be built 7 kilometres (4.3 miles) inland south of Abu Dhabi island in the United Arab Emirates, between Mohammed Bin Zayed City and Abu Dhabi International Airport. The new district will be the seat of the UAE's federal government, and one of the key centrepieces of Plan 2030. The district will also be the main location for Abu Dhabi's own central government bodies, with the total value of projects estimated at $40 billion.

The project will also have a fully integrated transport system tying into the rest of the transport network, including a high-speed rail service, metro railway and regional rail connections. Upon completion, the 4,900 hectare Zayed City will serve as a second downtown for Abu Dhabi proper and will be home to over 370,000 residents.

== See also ==
- Al-Karamah, the former planned capital of the UAE
