= 29th century BC in architecture =

== Buildings and structures ==
=== Buildings ===
- Dholavira, a metropolitan city of the Indus Valley civilization, located on Khadir island in the Kachchh District of Gujarat, India. The site was occupied from about 2900 to 2100 BC.
