= Janabiyah =

Janabiyah الجنبية
- Village
- Janabiyah within the Kingdom of Bahrain
- Coordinates: 26.183°N 50.466°E
- Country: Kingdom of Bahrain
- Governorate: Northern Governorate

Janabiyah (Arabic:الجنبية) is a village situated in the north-west of Bahrain, close to the Gulf of Bahrain. It is located south of Bani Jamra and to the west of the village of Saar. It is under the Northern Governorate administrative region of the country. The village is mainly popular for its camel farms that host around 100 camels.

== History ==
Janabiyah is home to hundreds of ancient burial mounds dating back to 2200 BC, during the Dilmun era of Bahraini history. The site is regarded by archaeologists as being "one of the most important heritage sites in the country". People buried in Janabiya were believed to have resided in the nearby villages of Saar and Budaiya since northern Bahrain was agriculturally rich. The Dilmunite practice was to bury the dead in central Bahrain in locations like Hamad Town, because of the dryness of the area however it was not always the case. The mounds were constructed from sand and limestone, obtained from nearby surroundings. Excavations at Janabiyah during 2005 yielded around forty-five artifacts, including Dilmun trade seals, pottery, shells, ostrich eggs, daggers, beads, baskets and 2 complete human skeletons.

Artifacts dating to the Dilmun era over 4,000 years ago were uncovered at a burial mound in Janabiyah in 2005. Trade seals with Indus Valley inscriptions were discovered, strengthening archaeologists' beliefs about the existence of regular trade between the Dilmun and Indus Valley civilisations respectively. The seals were found in a large burial mound that was believed to have been built for wealthy or religious people.

In J. G. Lorimer's Gazetteer of the Persian Gulf (1908), he writes that Janabiyah consisted of 20 huts inhabited by the Baharna, who were either fishermen or farmers. There were an estimated 1000 date palms, 8 donkey and 2 cows in the village.

== Facilities ==
Aside from the camel farm, the village is also host to multiple resorts and fitness centres. The Birla Institute of Technology International Centre is based alongside the Janabiyah highway. Sanabil private school was situated in the village prior to its closure, as well as the children's academy for the disabled.

Janabiyah hosts a two-story substation which is currently undergoing renovations that will install a 4000kV project. This will accommodate two transformers of 1,500kV each on the ground floor and main isolation and contact devices and four main low-voltage distribution boards.
