= Al Qala =

Village in Northern Governorate, Bahrain

Al Qala (Arabic: القلعة) is a village in the Northern Governorate of Bahrain. It is famous for being the location of the Bahrain Fort, the country's first UNESCO World Heritage Site. The village is also the site of expansion, with multiple housing projects being constructed in its vicinity, some of which were delayed because of the archaeological sites in the village.

== See also ==
- Alcalá (disambiguation)
