= Diraz =

Duraz الدراز
- Village
- Location within Bahrain
- Coordinates: 26°13′07″N 50°28′32″E
- Country: Bahrain
- Governorate: Northern Governorate

Population
  - Estimate: 18,000
- Time zone: UTC+3 (Bahrain Standard Time)

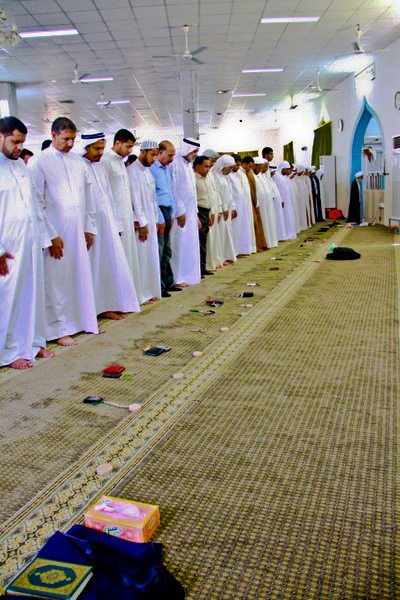
Friday prayer in Diraz

Diraz (Arabic: الدراز, also spelled Duraz) is the biggest and most populated village on the northwest coast of Bahrain. It lies to the east of Budaiya, west of Barbar and north of Bani Jamra. Two Dilmun-era archaeological sites, namely Diraz Temple and Ain Umm Sujoor, and Ain Umm Aldajaj are located in this village. Duraz is also known for its people's unique Bahraini dialect, which is quite different from that of its neighbouring villages.

It is a suburb inhabited by Bahraini Shiites with a minority of Asian immigrants

== Etymology ==
Diraz (Persian: دراز) in Persian means Long or lengthy.

== See also ==
- List of cities in Bahrain
- Diraz Temple
