= A'ali =

A'ali عالي
- Town
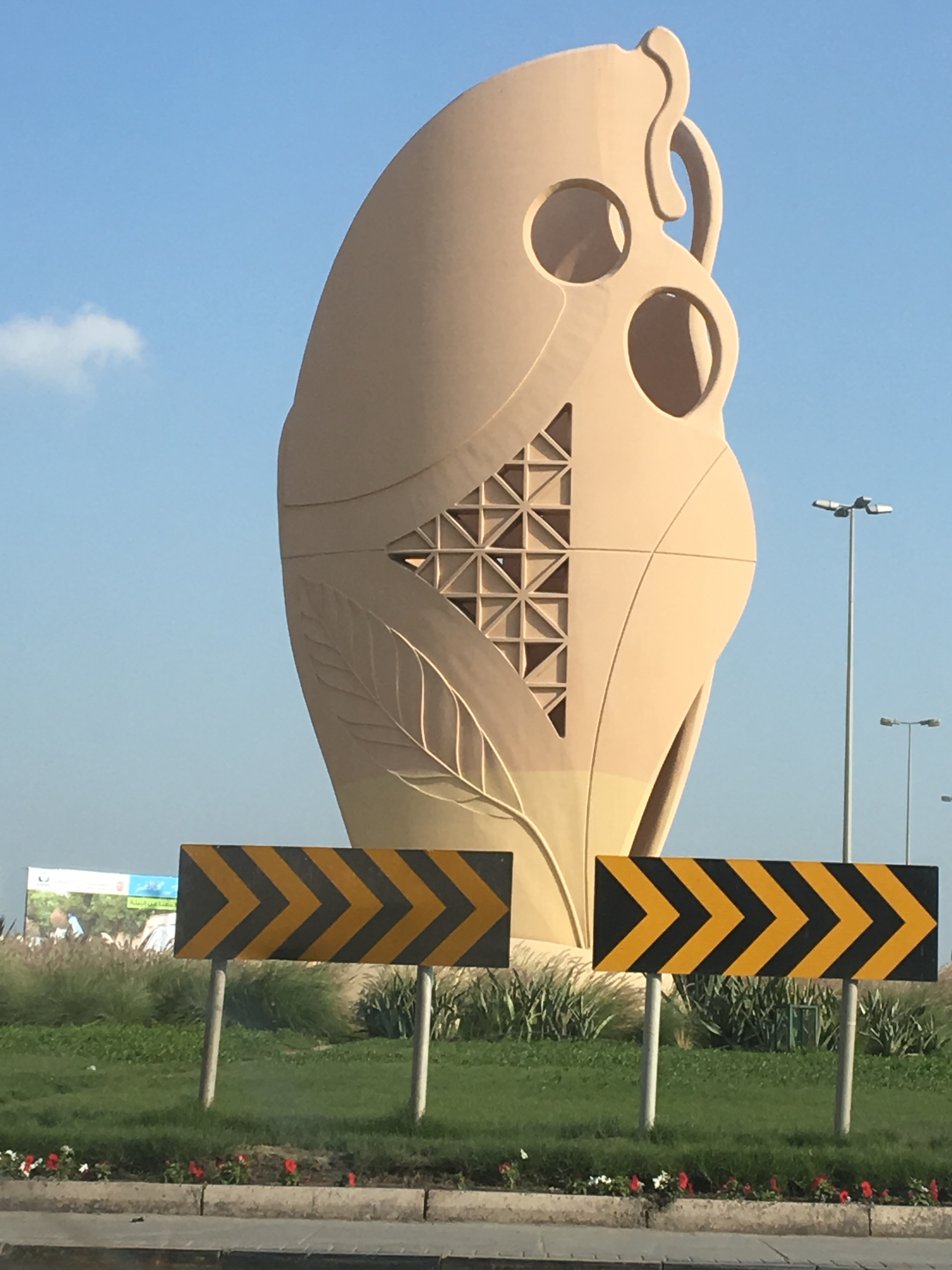
- The Pottery Roundabout, located in A’ali

- Location within Bahrain
- Coordinates: 26°09′07″N 50°31′32″E
- Country: Bahrain
- Governorate: Northern Governorate

Government
  - Governor: Ali bin Abdul Hussain Al Asfoor

Area
  - Total: 11.2 km^{2} (4.3 sq mi)

Population
  - Estimate (2012): 100,533
  - Density: 4,589/km^{2} (11,890/sq mi)
- Time zone: Arabia Standard Time (UTC+3)
- Website: Official website

A'ali (Arabic: عالي) is a major town in northern Bahrain. It is a part of the Northern Governorate, although from 2001 to 2014 it lay within the Central Governorate. A'ali is famous for its ancient burial mounds, especially several very large burial mounds in the city centre. A'ali is also famous for its traditional handcrafted pottery, which can be seen and bought from different potters and boutiques in the whole town.

== History ==
=== Dilmun era ===
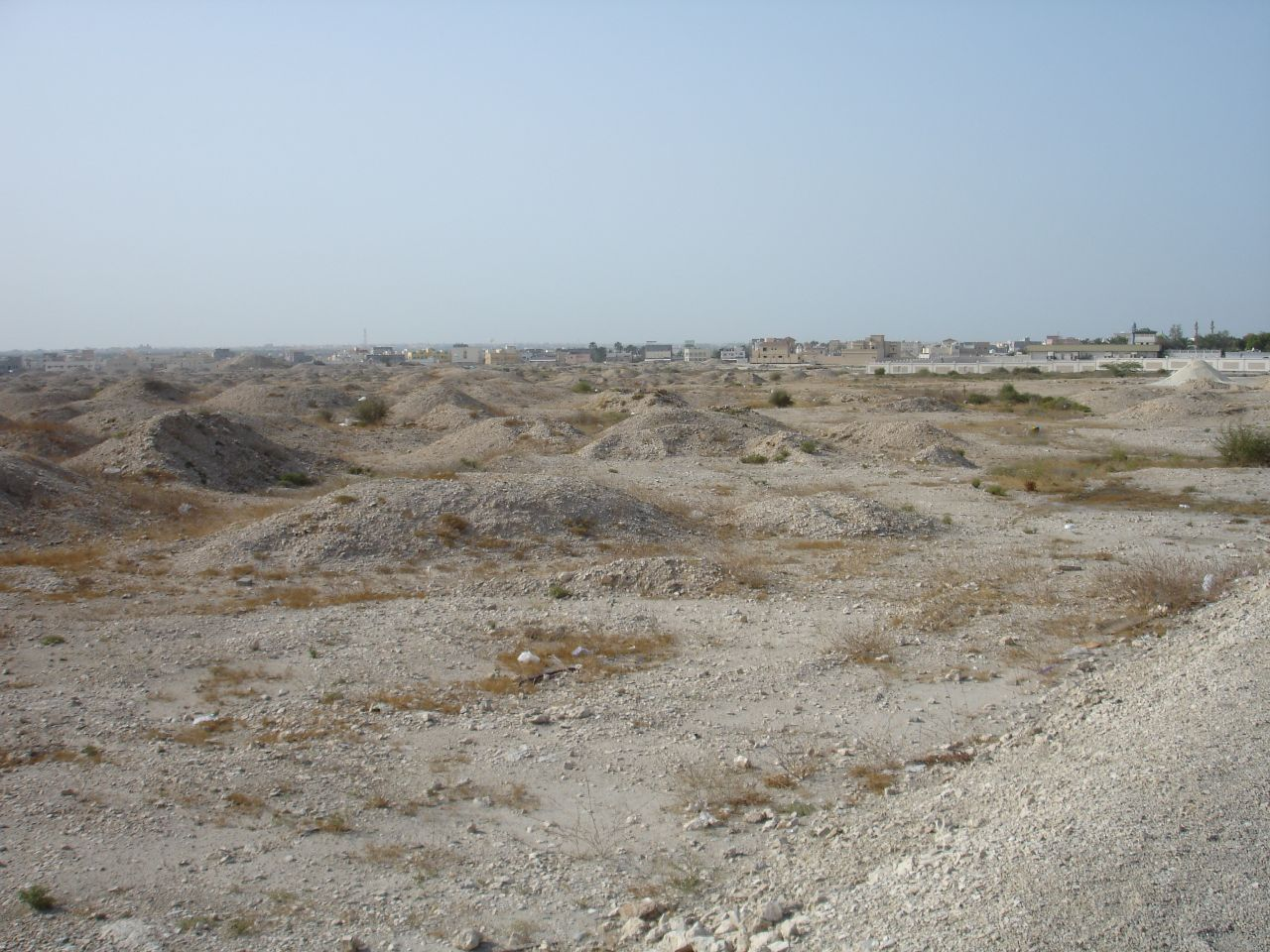
The A'ali burial mounds

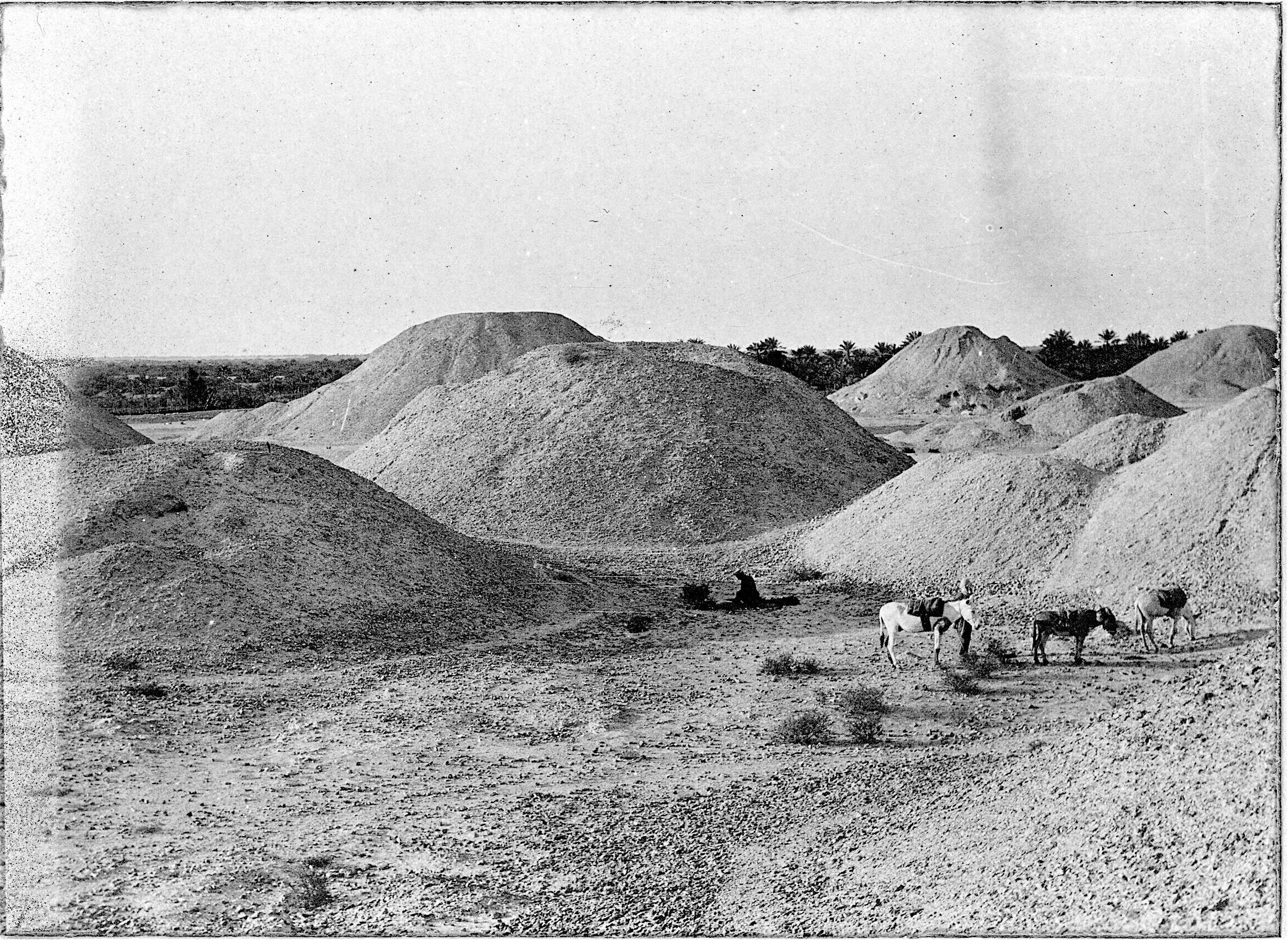
The Dilmun Burial Mounds in 1918

The burial mounds date to the Dilmun era (3200 BC-330 BC). In February 1889 some of the mounds were investigated by the British explorer J. Theodore Bent and his wife Mabel. The site was then excavated by many foreign archaeological teams throughout the 20th century. An important group of artifacts was excavated by the British archaeologist Ernest Mackay and can now be found in the British Museum, London. It includes an unusual statuette of a nude woman with a curvaceous body dating from between 2000 and 1500 BC. The discovery of a "new and rare type of burial mound encircled by an outer ring wall" has led archaeologists to believe that specific mounds were made for the social elite, indicating that early Dilmun culture had a class system.

=== 20th century ===
According to J. G. Lorimer's 1908 Gazetteer of the Persian Gulf, A'ali was a considerable village situated 6 miles southwest of the Manama fort. The town consisted of 200 houses populated by the Baharna, who were primarily pottery-makers and date palm cultivators. There were an estimated 8,250 date palms in the village and livestock included 35 donkeys & 10 cattle. Lorimer also mentions that the village was the site of the largest tumuli on the island

== Archaeology ==
Three cuneiform inscriptions were found, in Mound 8. They were all variants of the text "[Pa]lace of [Y]aglī-’el, [son] of Ri’mum, [the servant] of Inzak [of] Akarum". The same inscription was recovered, as a surface find, at Qal'at al-Bahrain.

== Geography ==
A'ali is located in the middle of Bahrain Island (al-awal island), south of Isa Town and north of Riffa. Its name (Arabic: عالي) translates to “high” in English and refers to the town’s high elevation from sea level. It lays approximately 15 km (9.3 miles) southwest of the capital Manama.

== Controversy ==
The mounds have been a source of controversy in Bahraini politics; in July 2008, the municipal council chairman of the central governorate called for the demolition of 62 ancient burial mounds to make way for the construction of a nearby junction. In 2009, the construction of a museum dedicated to the history of the mounds and of A'ali was announced.

== See also ==
- Bahrain Fort
- Arad Fort
- Riffa Fort
- List of cities in Bahrain
