= Al Markh =

Al Markh المرخ
- Village
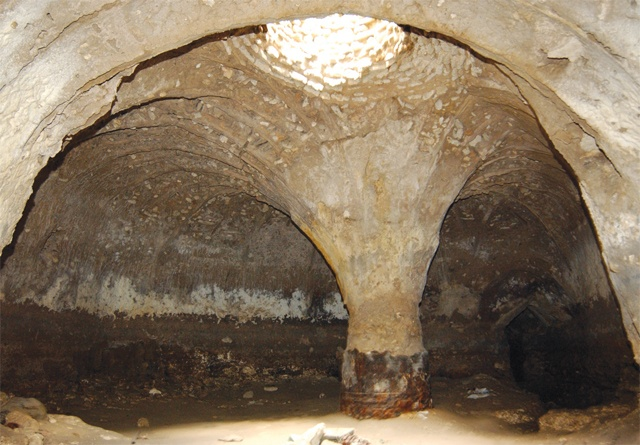
- The dried-out Aby Alyawa spring, in Al Markh village

- Al Markh within the Kingdom of Bahrain
- Coordinates: 26.22°N 50.466°E
- Country: Kingdom of Bahrain
- Governorate: Northern Governorate

Al Markh (Arabic: المرخ) is one of the oldest and smallest villages of Bahrain. It neighbors Budaiya highway and the village of Duraz to the north, Saar and Magaba highway to the east, the villages of Bani Jamra and Al Garya to the west, and the village of Saar to the south.

== Etymology ==
Some historians say the village was named after a Bedouin called Al Markh who settled in the village with his family due to it being uninhabited and suitable for farming, while others say that it is the name of a tree that was burned to warm up people thousands of years ago.

== History ==
Al Markh is the site of the Dilmun era "Abu Alyawa" spring. Al Markh, along with neighbouring villages Bani Jamra and Duraz, were traditional centres for canvas-making and sail making.

== Sister site ==
Al Markh is also the name of a low sand-covered mound located in the south-west of Bahrain, 6 km south of the village of Zallaq and 1,200 m from the sea. In 1975, a British archaeology team led by Michael Roaf excavated the Al Markh mound, after sherds belonging to the Ubaid era were found in 1971. The expedition resulted in the discovery of 6,896 pieces of flint, mainly in the form of scrapers. Evidence was also obtained from the site that showed that the sea level of Bahrain during the late Neolithic era was much higher than present-day levels by as much as 4 m with some speculating that Al Markh was itself an islet. Potteries found on the site were dated to 3,800 BC. It is assumed by archaeologists that the site did not host permanent settlements but rather, it was occupied seasonally by fishermen and hunters.

The site showed two phases of occupation:

- The earlier phase included flint chips and a number of painted potsherds that were dated to be from the late Ubaid or post-Ubaid era. The potteries were used, mended and then reused by inhabitants. Numerous fish bones belonging to the Sparid family were also found, mammal bones were rare onsite. Shellfish, including pearl oysters, were found as well as numerous shallow fire pits that had fish bones in them.
- The later phase had little pottery but much more flint than the previous phase. Seafood was still common although a larger fish bones were found. In contrast with the earlier phase, mammal bones belonging to goats, dugongs and hare were found.
