= Barbar Temple =

Archaeological site in Bahrain

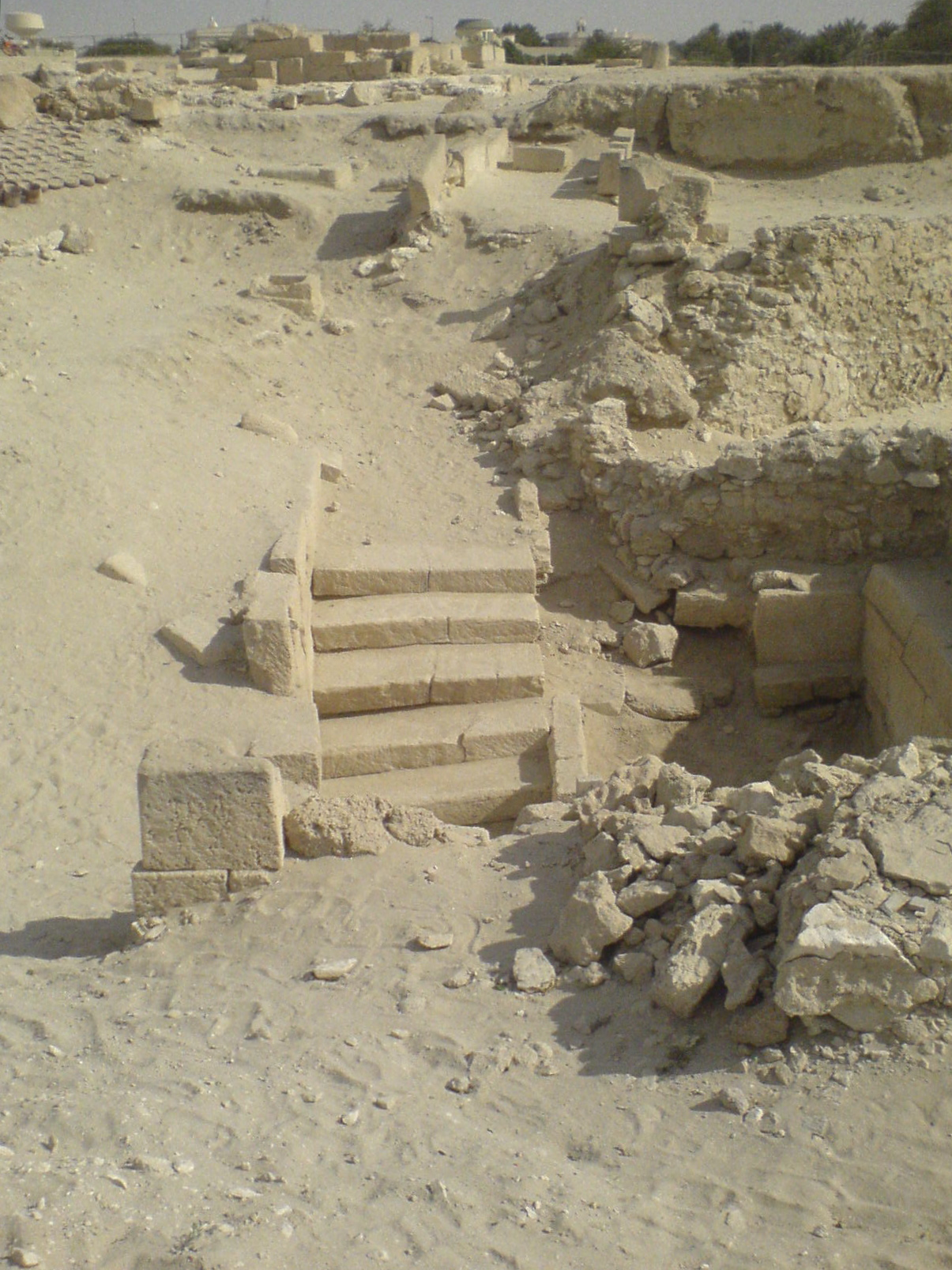
- Barbar Temple

- Location within Bahrain
- 26°13′34.46″N 50°29′2.51″E
- Type: Settlement
- Location: Barbar, Bahrain

Site notes
- Condition: In ruins

The Barbar Temple (Arabic: معبد باربار, romanized: Maʻbad Bārbār) is an archaeological site located in the village of Barbar, Bahrain, considered to be part of the Dilmun culture. The most recent of the three Barbar temples was rediscovered by a Danish archaeological team in 1954. A further two temples were discovered on the site with the oldest dating back to 3000 BC. The temples were built of limestone blocks, believed to have been carved out from Jidda Island.

== History ==
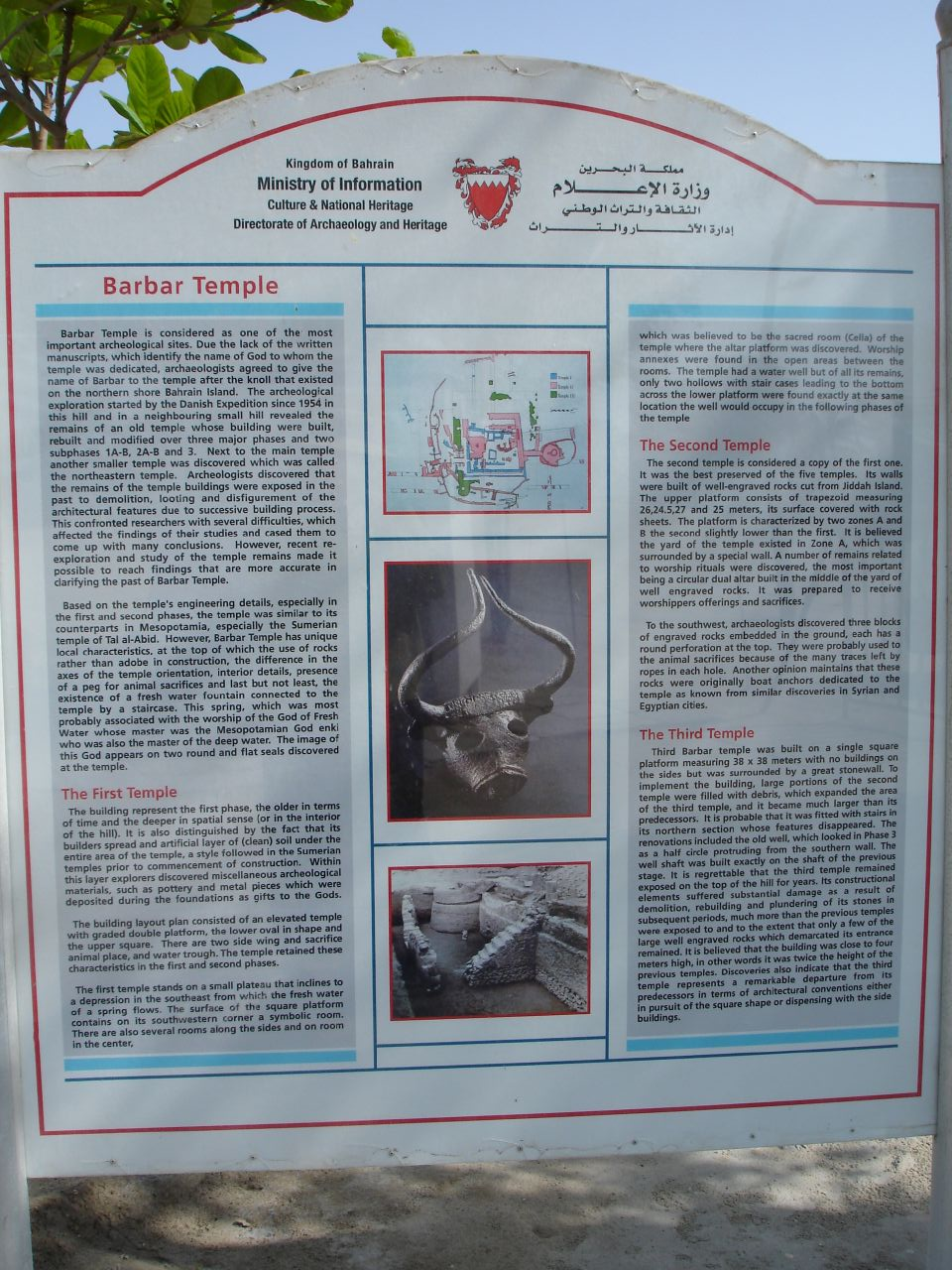
Sign at the site

The three temples were built atop one another with the second built approximately 500 years later and the third added between 2100 BC and 2000 BC.

It is thought that the temples were constructed to worship the god Enki, the god of wisdom and freshwater, and his wife Nankhur Sak (Ninhursag). The temple contains two altars and a natural water spring that is thought to have held spiritual significance for the worshipers. During the excavation of the site many tools, weapons, pottery and small pieces of gold were found which are now on display in the Bahrain National Museum. The most famous find was a copper bull's head.

The site is on the tentative list of UNESCO World Heritage Sites.

== Archaeology ==
The site was discovered by P.V. Glob in 1954. Excavations, by a Danish team led by Hellmuth Andersen and Peder Mortensen, began that year and extended until 1962. The summit of a gravel mound was removed in the winter of 1955 and walls were excavated in February and March 1956. Work at the site resumed in 2004.

== Temple I ==
Temple I, the earliest temple was built on a rectangular platform approximately 25m long and 16 to 18m wide. This was originally constructed on a bed of clean sand, which appears to have been consolidated by a layer of blue clay. The temple was covered by a second layer of clean sand.

At the foundation of Temple I offerings were deposited in the clay core of the temple terrace and they consisted of dozens of clay goblets found in separate groups each containing seven beakers which were broken and buried within the foundations of the terrace. Also copper objects were deposited in small heaps or singly. In the south-western corner of this early temple, steps led down to a square-built well. The central terrace was preserved in its full height, 2 metres, with the remains of trapezoid shrine in the center and adjoining rooms. This first one was built from local Bahraini stone. The cult features the subterranean shrine, the temple well and the oval sacrificial court.

== Temple II ==
Temple II is most liveable still with retaining walls and terraces stiffs, first stage the oval terrace was built in local stone, but after an enlargement it was built in limestone which must have been carried by boat from nearby Jidda island where stone was hewn out by hand and carefully dressed into remarkably neat masonry blocks. The skill with which this task was carried out may be clearly seen in the temple walls and especially around the sacred well. A double circular altar and an offering table stood in the center of the shrine. To the south were three cult stones shaped like the anchors of the merchant ships. Although the central one bore a protruding animal head, like the altars depicted on the seals. A temple treasure lay in the stone frame pit in the north-east comer. The central terrace was crowned by a shrine built of cut stone with stone paving. Smaller buildings clustered around it covering the rest of the terrace. There were no buildings on the outer oval terrace but altars and cult symbols were visible. A plinth with recessed stone cylinder lay to the south and a plinth with three pillars was situated near the north-west wall. A double row of plinths for cult objects lined both sides of the stairs from the upper terrace. On each of these plinths were two square holes lined with bitumen and sheet copper nailed to wood. Here may have stood copper mounted poles with the emblems of gods, so often seen on the stamp seals, or, perhaps, wooden statues. From the central terrace a ceremonial stairway led to the subterranean shrine where water cult ceremonies took place. Halfway down the stair was a portal, and from there the stair was roofed. The rich natural spring which filled the pool probably accounts for the siting of the temple at Barbar. Water poured from a perforated stone jar beside a semicircular stone font at the threshold of a dry chamber near the basin. From the comers of the shrine deep stone built channels led the water to the surrounding fields and gardens.

This remarkable underground shrine is interpreted as a symbolic abzu, the abode of Enki, the god of wisdom and of all freshwater. The abzus was believed to be the abyss or freshwater ocean upon which the whole world rests. Such temple abzus are mentioned in cuneiform texts in Mesopotamia. East of the temple lay an oval sacrificial court, connected with a central temple platform by a paved ramp and a staircase. The floor of the court was covered with ashes and the bones of cattle and sheep, presumably sacrificed animals.

== Temple III ==
Temple III in use until the early centuries of the second millennium, was larger than its predecessors. Two circular offering tables of finely cut stone with a low altar between them still stand in the middle of the courtyard. Note the three standing stone blocks pierced with a round hold. It is thought that these were tethering points for the sacrificial animals. The third temple's terrace was probably about 30 square metres (320 sq ft).

== See also ==
- List of archaeological sites in Bahrain
- Culture of Bahrain
- Cities of the ancient Near East
