= Jidda Island =

Island in Bahrain

Jidda Islands
Native name: جزيرة جدة (Arabic)
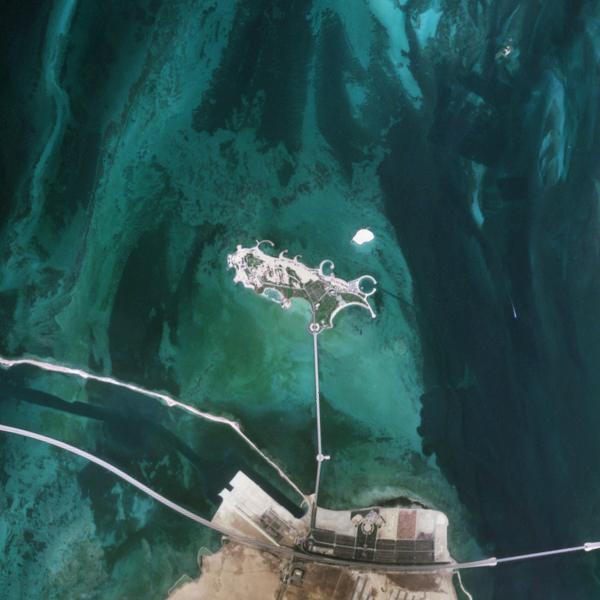

- Location within Bahrain

Geography
- Location: Persian Gulf
- Coordinates: 26.193°N 50.405°E
- Archipelago: Bahrain
- Adjacent to: Persian Gulf
- Total islands: 3
- Major islands: Jidda Island; North Jidda; Mini Bahrain
- Area: 0.5 km^{2} (0.19 sq mi)
- Highest elevation: 10 m (30 ft)

Administration
- Bahrain
- Governorate: Northern Governorate
- Largest settlement: Jidda Island (pop. 0)

Demographics
- Demonym: Bahraini
- Population: 0 (2016)
- Pop. density: 0/km^{2} (0/sq mi)
- Ethnic groups: Bahraini, non-Bahraini

Additional information
- Time zone: AST (UTC+3)
- ISO code: BH-14
- Official website: www.bahrain.com

Jidda Islands (Arabic: جزيرة جدة) are a group of three small uninhabited islets in Bahrain, lying to the west of Bahrain Island and just north of Umm an Nasan in the Persian Gulf. They are 17.5 km (10.9 mi) west of the capital, Manama, on Bahrain Island.

== History ==
In 1930 Jidda became the location of one of Bahrain's prisons. Majeed Marhoon, Abdulhadi Khalaf and several other political activists spent time in the prison in the 1960s and 1970s. It later became the private property of Khalifa bin Salman Al Khalifa, Prime Minister of Bahrain from 1970 until his death in 2020, and is currently closed to the public.

== Geography ==
The main island is made of limestone cliffs. It is believed that blocks of rock cut from the island were used in the Barbar temple on Bahrain Island. The small Mini Bahrain is an artificial island on the south shore made to look exactly like the big Bahrain Island.

== Demography ==
The island has a palace, gardens, a helipad, a mosque and other facilities established for the late prime minister and his family, although the island is uninhabited and Sheikh Khalifa himself lived in Riffa, Bahrain Island until his death in November 2020.

== Administration ==
The island belongs to the Northern Governorate of Bahrain.

== Transportation ==
It is connected to Umm an Nasan by a 1.75 km (1.09 mi) causeway.

== Image gallery ==
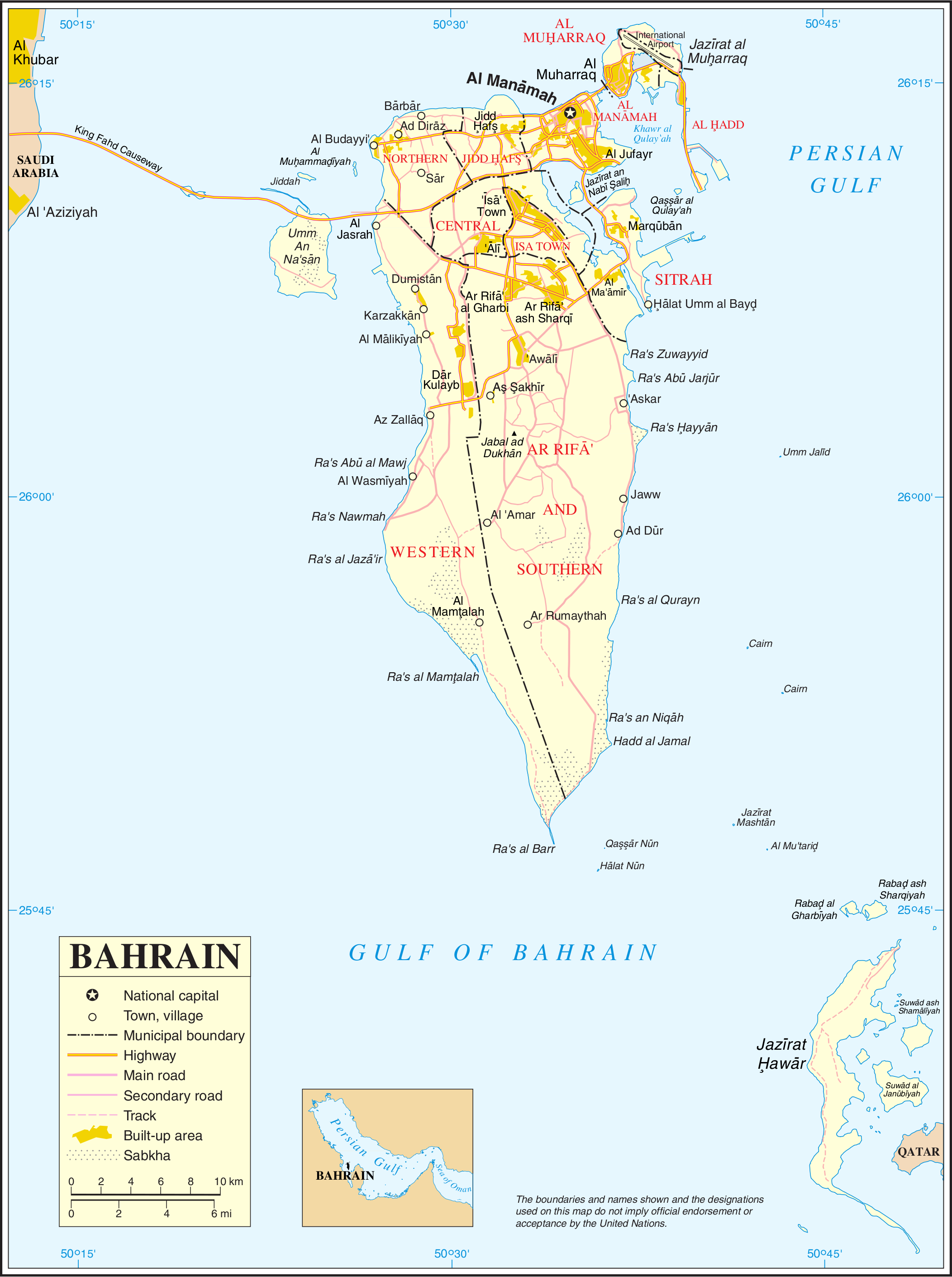
Map 1

District Map

== See also ==
- List of islands of Bahrain
