= Karzakan =

Karzakan كرزكان
- Village
- Location in Bahrain
- Coordinates: 26°6′50″N 50°28′54″E
- Country: Bahrain
- Governorate: Northern Governorate
- Website: https://www.karzakan.info

Karzakan (Arabic: كرزكان) is a village in Bahrain. It lies along the western coast of Bahrain Island. The seventeenth-century theologian Salih Al-Karzakani hailed from this village. The village is several kilometers to the right of King Fahd Causeway.

This village is also the birthplace of chemical engineer Mohammed Ebrahim. Who has made numerous contributions to Bahraini Chemical engineering
