= Shakhura =

Coordinates: 26°13′N 50°30′E

Al-Shakhura or simply Shakhura (Arabic: شاخورة, sometimes transliterated as Shakura) known as Shah Khoura (شاه خورا) in Persian, is a village situated in north-central Bahrain. It is a part of the Northern Governorate administrative region. The village is notable for its burial mounds, which have been nominated as a UNESCO World Heritage Site.

== Etymology ==
Given Bahrain's connection with Persian rules on the Island, particularly during the Achaemenid, Sassanian, Parthian, and Safavid Empires, the name "Shakhura" (شاه خورا) likely has Persian roots, similarly to other city names. "Shah" (شاه) means "king" in Persian, while "Khura" (خورا) is less clear but could be derived from older or regional Persian dialects:

- One possible interpretation is that "Khura" might mean "food" or "sustenance," so Shakhura could be translated as "King's sustenance" or "King's nourishment."
- Another is that "Khura" (خورہ) could be derived from "khur" (خور) which in Persian means "bay," Together, "Shah Khura" could potentially mean "King's Bay" or "Bay King".

However, the exact meaning might be linked to a historical or geographical context that could reveal a more specific interpretation.

== History ==
Shakhura is the site of an ancient necropolis dating back to the Tylos era of Bahraini history. The site was estimated to have been occupied from the 3rd century BC to the 4th century AD. Of significant interest of the site was a large 80 m long, 4–12.7 high burial mound. It was noted to have had several distinct raised parts. The mound was demolished during the 1990s to make way for buildings.

== Archaeological excavations ==
Archaeological work at the mound revealed 90 graves with the earliest graves situated in the centre of the mound, while others were added later in arcs around the mound. Excavations carried out by Captain Robert Higham from the Royal Signals during the 1960s revealed a number of important artefacts dating from the Roman and Parthian times, included an intact glass ribbed bowl, that are now kept at the British Museum in London. In 2008, archaeologists announced the discovery of a layer of ash that contained fragments of glazed pottery with fish and animal bones, on the site. This led to archaeologists speculating that the Tylos civilisation practiced funeral banquets, which involved offering food and drink to the deceased and burying human and animal bones inside the tomb.
