= Hillat Abdul Saleh =

Coordinates: 26.229°N 50.518°E

Hillat Abdul Saleh (Arabic: حلة عبد الصالح) is a village located in the Kingdom of Bahrain, west of the village of Karbabad, on the outskirts of the capital city Manama. The village lies immediately south of the Bahrain Fort, which is recognised as the country's first UNESCO World Heritage Site.

== Administration ==
The village lies in the Capital Governorate administrative region of Bahrain.
