= Karrana =

Karrana كرانة
- Village
- Location in Bahrain
- Coordinates: 26°13′50″N 50°30′39″E
- Country: Bahrain
- Governorate: Northern Governorate

Population
  - Total: 12,000
- Website: Karrana heritage

Karrana (Arabic: كرانة, from Persian: کرانه karāna, meaning "coast, bank") is a village located in the Northern Governorate, Bahrain. The village is nicknamed the "Green Village" because of its green palms and relative suitability of its land for agriculture. The village is located west of the capital Manama.

== Etymology ==
Karraneh (Persian: کرانه) means "coast" in Persian. This is likely due to the village's location near the coast.

== Population ==
Karrana is inhabited by 12,000 people and is home to the Karrana Elementary School for Girls. Historically, Karrana was divided into a group of villages, which were: Al Muqaysim, Rozkan, Al Harbadiya, Al Majrafat, but now it is considered to be one village. Some of the distinct areas of the consolidated village include Al Mahmoodiyat, Fareeq Al Manai, Fareeq Al Loza, and others.

== Notable people ==
Abduladhim Al Muhtadi Al Bahrani says in his book Ulama Al Bahrain Durus Wa Ibar (Arabic: علماء البحرين دروس و عبر) page 111 that a skilled author and scientist named Sayyid Abdullah Al Qarooni, who wrote Sharh Al Mughni, was from the village. However, little is known of Al Qarooni aside from what was noted by Al Bahrani's book and another book called Anwar Al Badrain. It is not known precisely when Al Qarooni died, but it was sometime in 1000 hijri.

=== Religious figures ===
- Alama Abduladhim Al Muhtadi Al Bahrani
- Sheikh Mirza Hussain Ali Abbas Al Aswad
- Sayyid Makki Sayyid Hilal Al Wadai

=== Businessmen ===
- Hajji Isa Hamza Abbas Al Aswad
