= Muqaba =

Village in Bahrain

Coordinates: 26.211°N 50.493°E

Maqabah (Arabic: مقابة. Mgaba) is a village in Bahrain. It is 10 km (6.2 mi) away from the capital Manama.

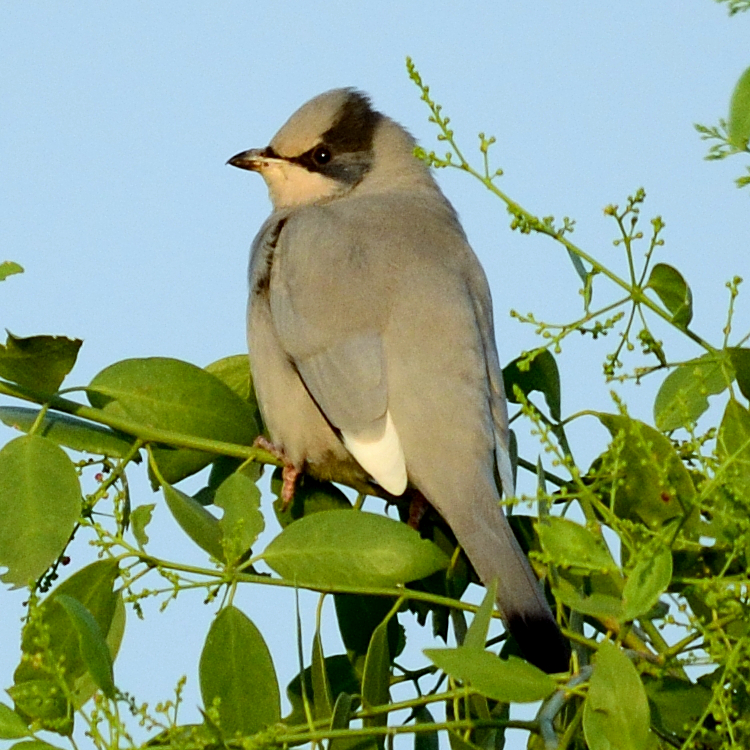
Grey hypocolius

== Important Bird Area ==
Some 200 ha of semi-arid, date-palm scru in Maqabah, privately owned but left uncultivated, has been designated an Important Bird Area (IBA) by BirdLife International because it is the main roosting site for a significant passage and wintering population of grey hypocolius in Bahrain.
