= Bahraini =

Bahraini may refer to:

- Something of, or related to Bahrain
- A person from Bahrain, or of Bahraini descent; see Baharna or Demographics of Bahrain
- Bahraini culture
- Bahraini cuisine

== See also ==
- Bahrani Arabic
- List of Bahranis
