= Jannusan =

Village in Northern Governorate, Bahrain

Jannusan جنوسان
- Village
- Location in Bahrain
- Coordinates: 26°14′N 50°30′E
- Country: Bahrain
- Governorate: Northern
- Time zone: UTC+3 (AST)

Jannusan (Arabic: جنوسان) is a village in the Northern Governorate of Bahrain. It is known for its gardens and orchards, which are frequented by tourists. The area's historical catering to tourists has caused grievances between the Bahraini government and the local populace, with residents complaining of inadequate housing and cramped living spaces. In response, the government has built and subsidized, in conjunction with the country's major banks, social housing in the village.

== Etymology ==
There are a number of explanations for how the name Jannusan came to be. According to Bahraini historian Sheikh Muhammad Ali Al-Tajer, Jannusan is a warped portmanteau of the Arabic words for jinn (a supernatural being in Arab and Islamic mythology) and human. Meanwhile, the philologist Al-Nasiri wrote that Jannusan is a corruption of the Dilmun name Jun San. Locals meanwhile insist the name is of Persian origin, a distortion of the words "paradise of man" in the Persian language, a reference to the picturesque landscape surrounding the village.

== Social issues ==
Adequate housing has historically been a point of contention between locals and the Bahraini government. In 2004, residents claimed that less than ten percent of the land in the village was inhabited by locals, while the rest consisted of gardens and orchards meant to attract foreign tourists. The Bahrain-based Ithmaar Bank announced in May 2021 that it had begun offering financing for villas at the Danaat Al Baraka complex in Jannusan, as part of the government's social housing scheme to help Bahraini nationals purchase their first homes. The following month, the Al Baraka Islamic Bank announced that the complex's first residents had moved in.

Pro-democracy protests took place in Jannusan in 2013, and again in 2023, amid hunger strikes by imprisoned democracy activists.

== Tourism ==
As part of its 2021 national revitalization campaign, the government-run Bahrain Authority for Culture and Antiquities (BACA) installed signs at the Jannusan Tylos Necropolis, with QR codes directing visitors to a website and video with further information in Arabic and English.

== Accidents ==
The collapse of the first floor ceiling of an under-construction building in Jannusan at 8 a.m. on 22 July 2018 seriously injured five people. All of the injured were Asian workers. It was the first such accident in the village and prompted an investigation by the interior ministry.
