= Land reclamation =

Creating new land from oceans, seas, riverbeds or lakes

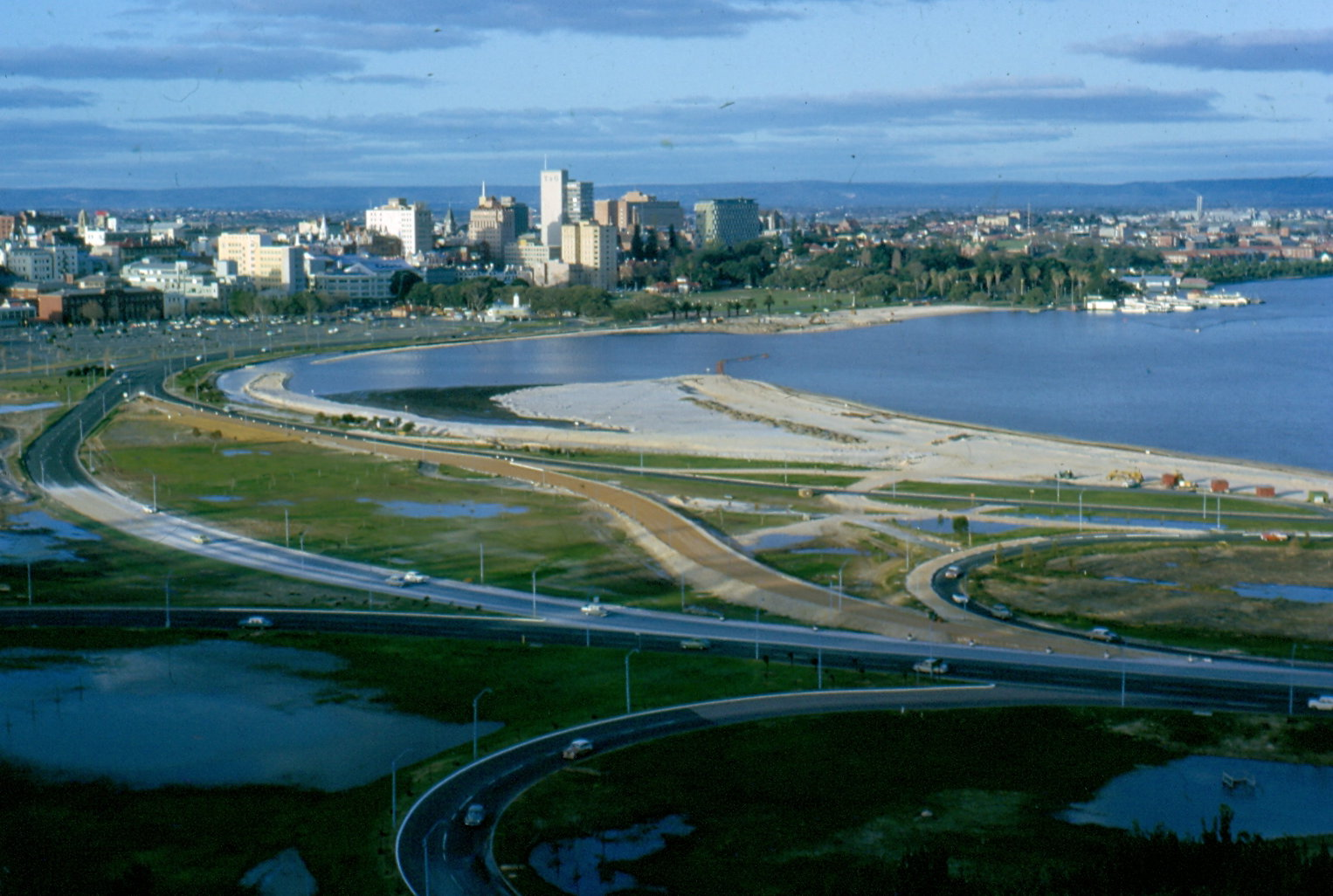
Reclaiming in Mounts Bay, Perth, in 1964

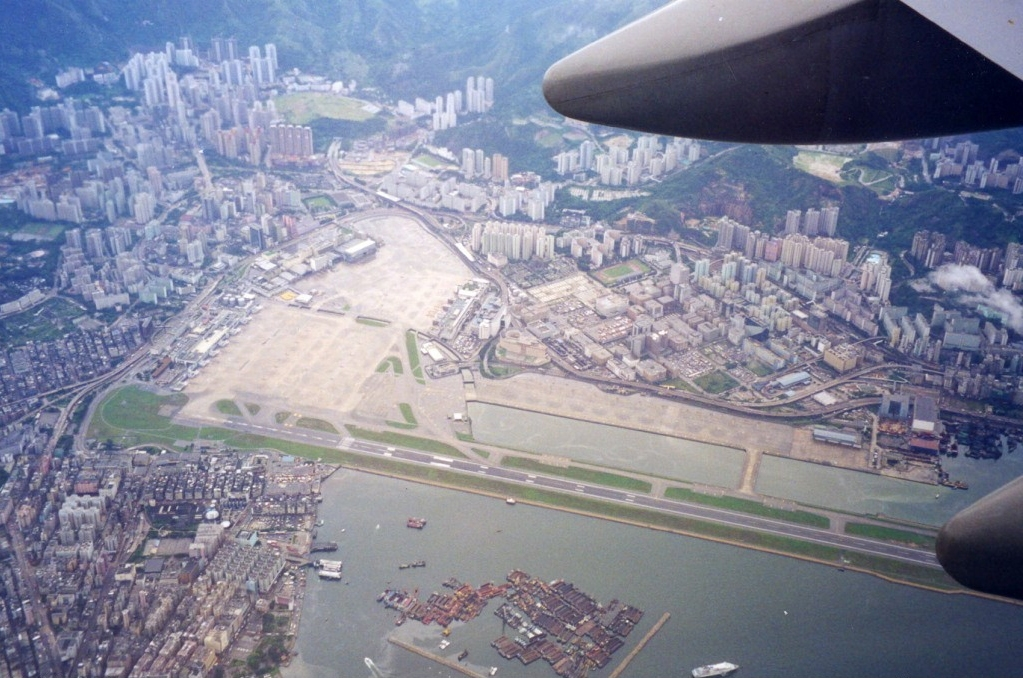
The former airport of Hong Kong (pictured) and the current airport of Hong Kong were built on reclaimed land.

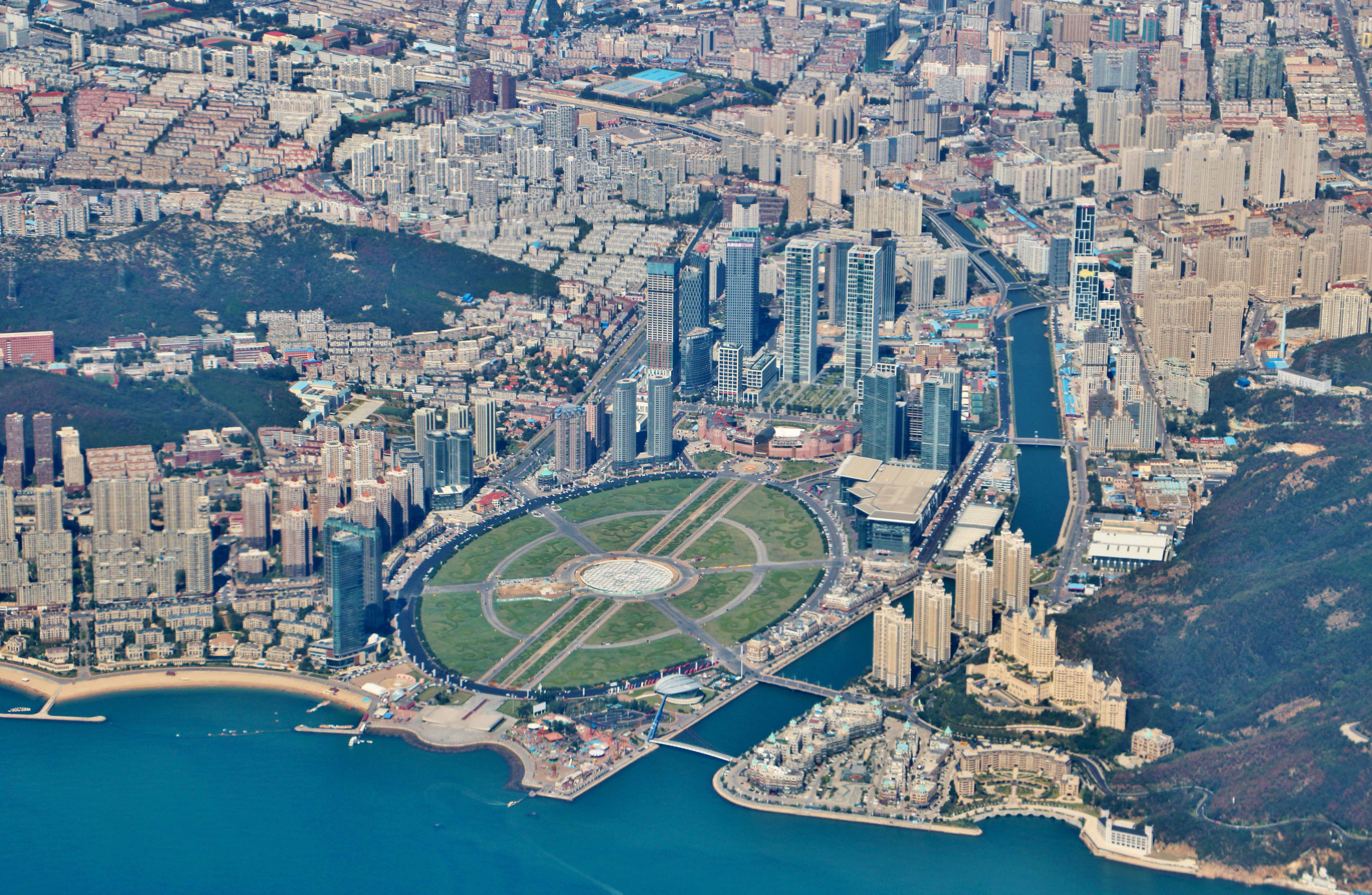
The largest city square in the world, the Xinghai Square of Dalian, China, was created entirely through land reclamation.

Land reclamation, often known as reclamation, and also known as land fill (not to be confused with a waste landfill), is the process of creating new land from oceans, seas, riverbeds or lake beds. The land reclaimed is known as reclamation ground, reclaimed land, or land fill.

== History ==
In ancient Egypt, the rulers of the Twelfth Dynasty (c. 2000–1800 BC) undertook a far-sighted land reclamation scheme to increase agricultural output. They constructed levees and canals to connect the Faiyum with the Bahr Yussef waterway, diverting water that would have flowed into Lake Moeris and causing gradual evaporation around the lake's edges, creating new farmland from the reclaimed land. A similar land reclamation system using dams and drainage canals was used in the Greek Copaic Basin during the Middle Helladic Period (c. 1900–1600 BC). Another early large-scale project was the Beemster Polder in the Netherlands, adding 70 square kilometres (27 sq mi) of land in 1612. In Hong Kong, the Praya Reclamation Scheme added 20 to 24 hectares (50 to 60 acres) of land in 1890 during the second phase of construction. It was one of the most ambitious projects undertaken during the era of colonial Hong Kong. Some 20% of land in the Tokyo Bay area has been reclaimed, most notably Odaiba artificial island. The city of Rio de Janeiro was largely built on reclaimed land, as was Wellington. During the 18th and 19th centuries The Seven Islands of Bombay (now Mumbai) were joined with the help of several land reclamation projects like Hornby Vellard and Colaba Causeway.

== Methods ==
Land reclamation can be achieved by a number of different methods. The simplest method involves filling the area with large amounts of heavy rock or cement, then filling with clay and dirt until the desired height is reached. The process is called "infilling" and the material used to fill the space is generally called "infill". Draining of submerged wetlands is often used to reclaim land for agricultural use. Deep cement mixing is used typically in situations in which the material displaced by either dredging or draining may be contaminated and hence needs to be contained. Land dredging is also another method of land reclamation. It is the removal of sediments and debris from the bottom of a body of water. It is commonly used for maintaining reclaimed land masses as sedimentation, a natural process, fills channels and harbors.

== Notable instances ==
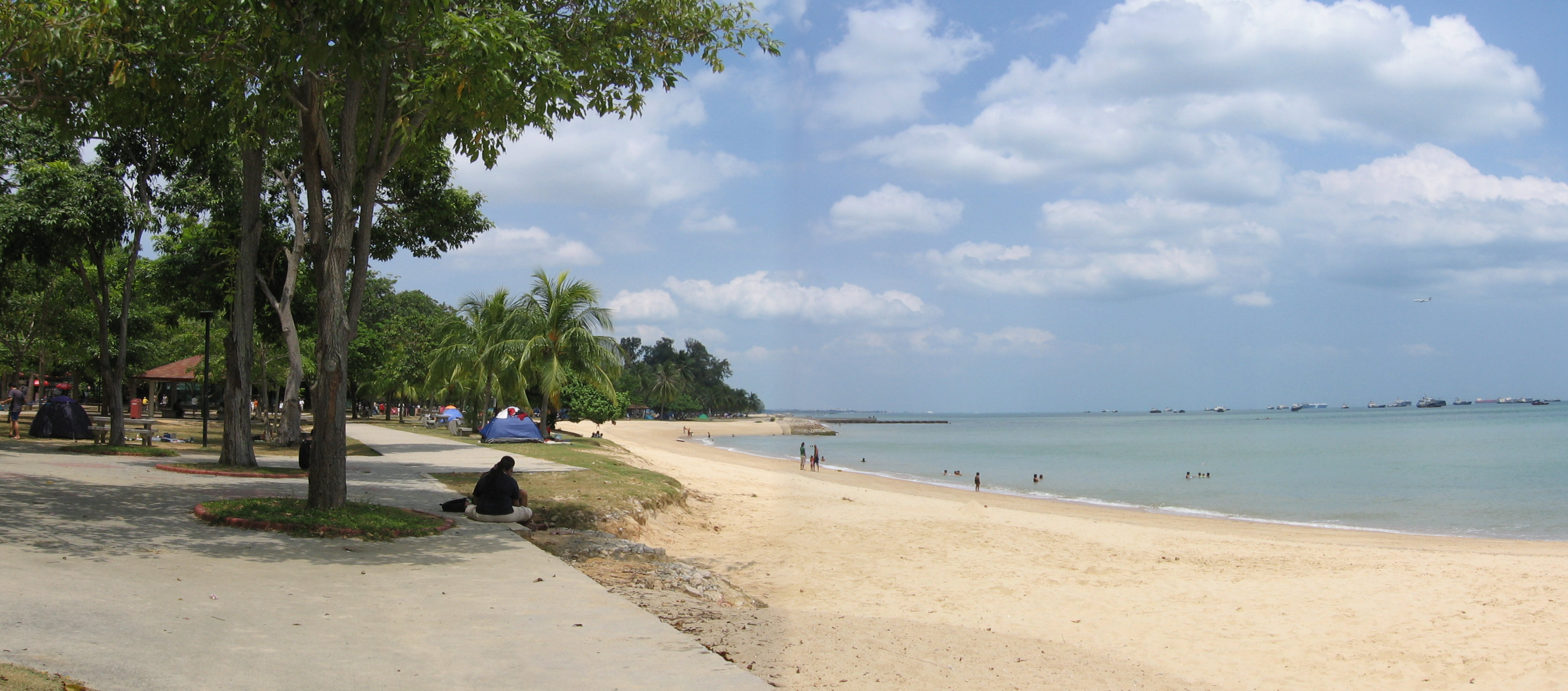
East Coast Park in Singapore was built on reclaimed land with a human-made beach.

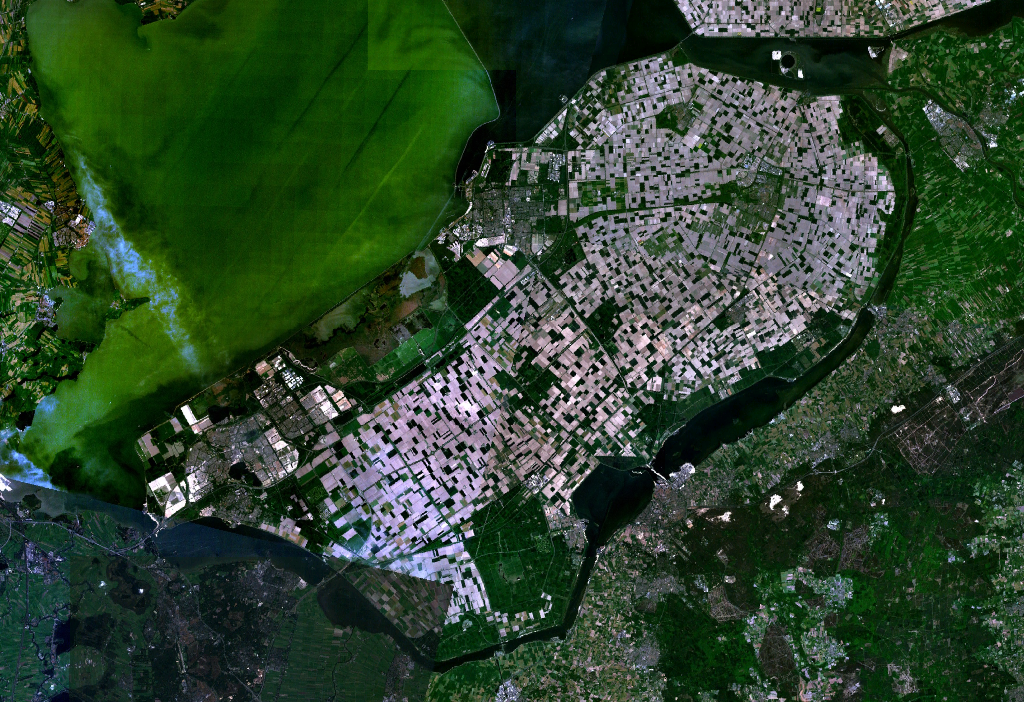
The Flevopolder in the Netherlands, reclaimed from the IJsselmeer, is the largest reclaimed artificial island in the world.

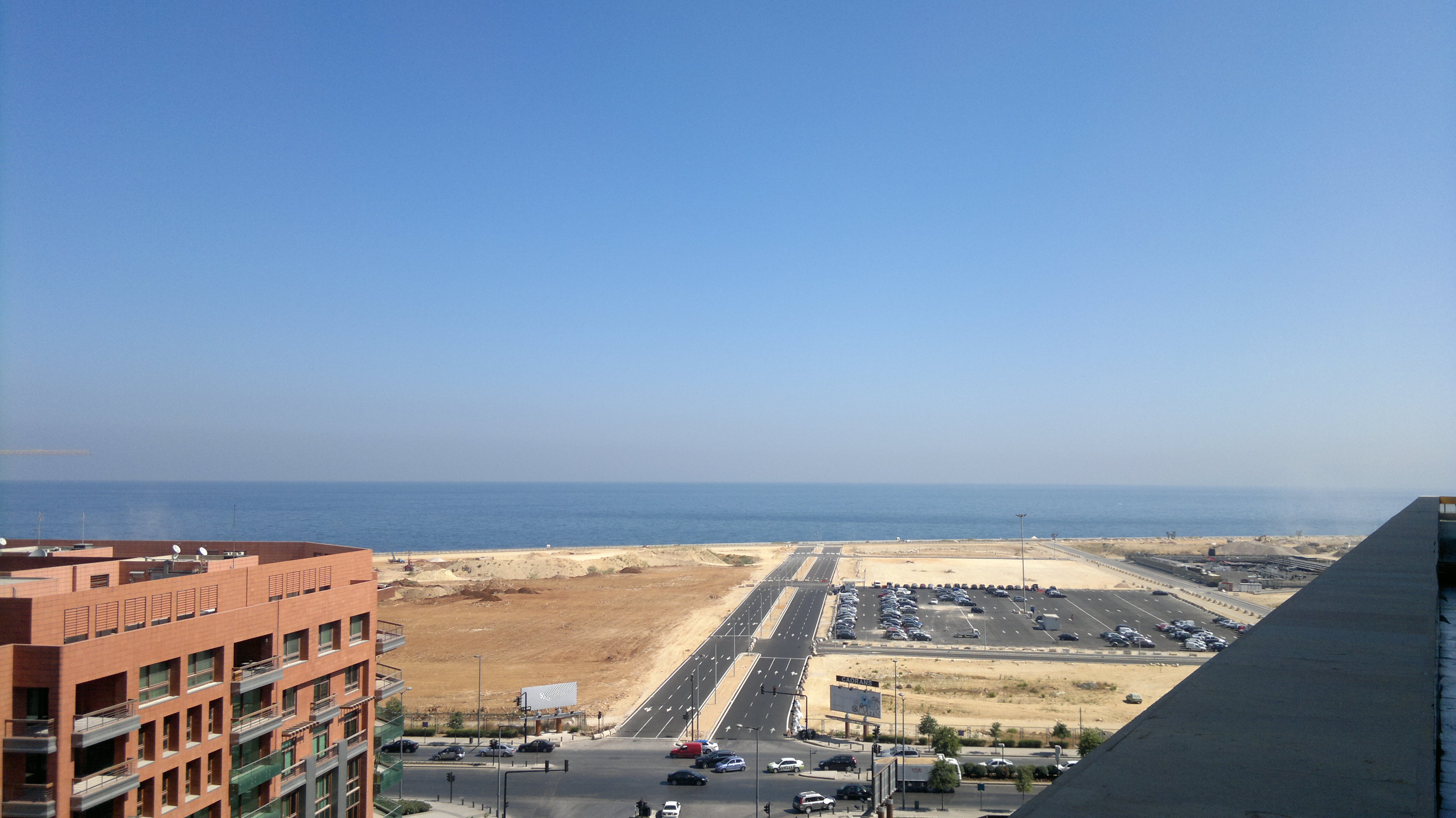
Land Reclamation in the Beirut Central District

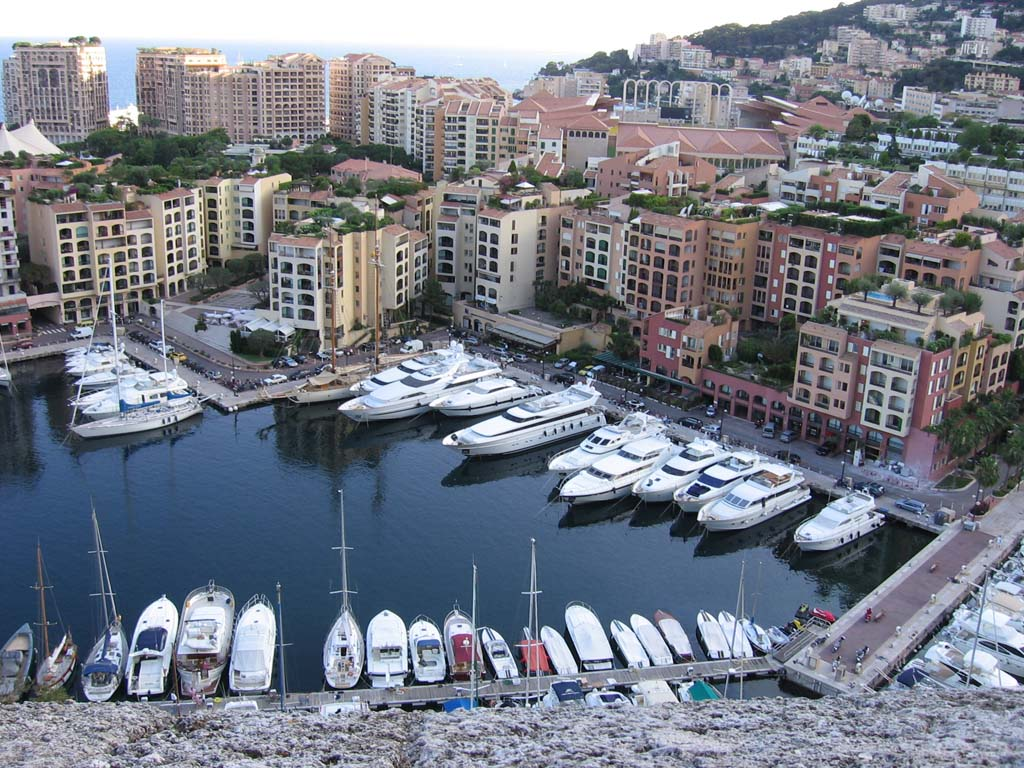
The whole district of Fontvieille, Monaco was reclaimed from the sea

=== Africa ===
Algeria

- Much of the Bay of Algiers connecting islands such as the Peñón of Algiers

Morocco

- The Hassan II Mosque is built on reclaimed land.

Nigeria

- The Eko Atlantic in Lagos.
- Gracefield Island in Lekki, Lagos.

South Africa

- The Foreshore in Cape Town.

Tanzania

- Stone Town in Zanzibar.

=== Asia ===
- Parts of the coastlines of mainland China, Hong Kong, North Korea and South Korea. It is estimated that nearly 65% of tidal flats around the Yellow Sea have been reclaimed.

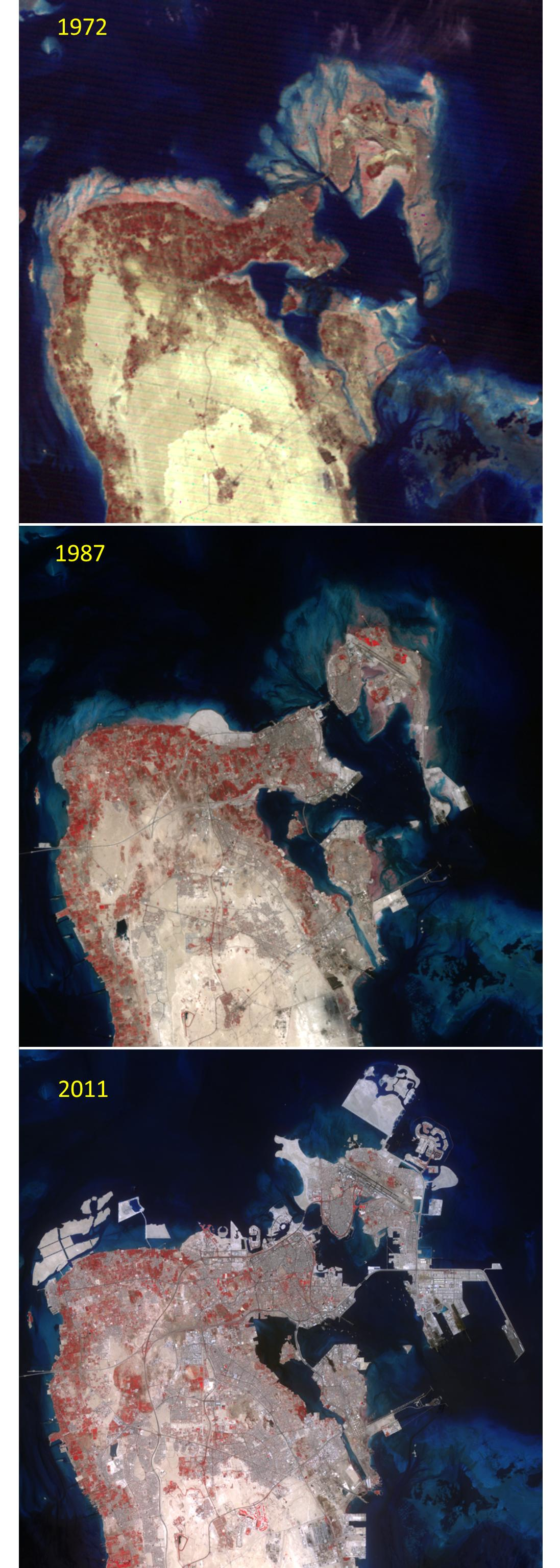
Satellite images showing progression of land reclamation in Bahrain.

Bahrain

- The north of Bahrain.

China

- Inland lowlands in the Yangtze valley, including the areas of important cities like Wuhan.
- Nanhui New City in Shanghai
- Haikou Bay, Hainan Province, where the west side of Haidian Island is being extended, and off the coast of Haikou, where new land for a marina is being created.
- The Cotai area of Macau, where many casinos are located.
- Parts of Shekou in Shenzhen, Guangdong province.

India

- Much of the coastline of Mumbai, India. It took over 150 years to join the original Seven Islands of Bombay. These seven islands were lush, green, thickly wooded, and dotted with 22 hills, with the Arabian Sea washing through them at high tide. The original Isle of Bombay was only 24 km (15 mi) long and 4 km (2.5 mi) wide from Dongri to Malabar Hill (at its broadest point) and the other six were Colaba, Old Woman's Island, Mahim, Parel, Worli and Mazgaon. (See also Hornby Vellard).

Indonesia

- The shore of Jakarta Bay. Land is usually reclaimed to create new housing areas and real estate properties, for the rapidly expanding city of Jakarta. So far, the largest reclamation project in the city is the creation of Golf Island, north of Pantai Indah Kapuk.
- Giant Sea Wall Jakarta

Japan

- Nagoya Centrair Airport.
- Kansai International Airport, Osaka.
- Much of Tokyo Bay, including Port of Tokyo, Haneda Airport, and Tokyo Disneyland.

Lebanon

- Beirut Central District.

Maldives

- Hulhumalé Island, one of the six divisions of Malé City.
- Addu Atoll, the southernmost atoll of the Maldives.

Malaysia

- Forest City, an integrated residential and tourism district in Johor, Malaysia, was controversial due to its reclamation of wetlands of international importance under the Ramsar Convention in a designated Environmentally Sensitive Area (ESA) Rank 1 area.

Pakistan

- Much of the coastline of Karachi.

Philippines

- The North Reclamation Area in Cebu City.
- The whole 3 km^{2} (1.2 sq mi) business district of Cebu South Road Properties in Cebu City.
- The shore of Manila Bay, especially along Metro Manila, has attracted major developments such as the Mall of Asia Complex, Entertainment City and the Cultural Center of the Philippines Complex.

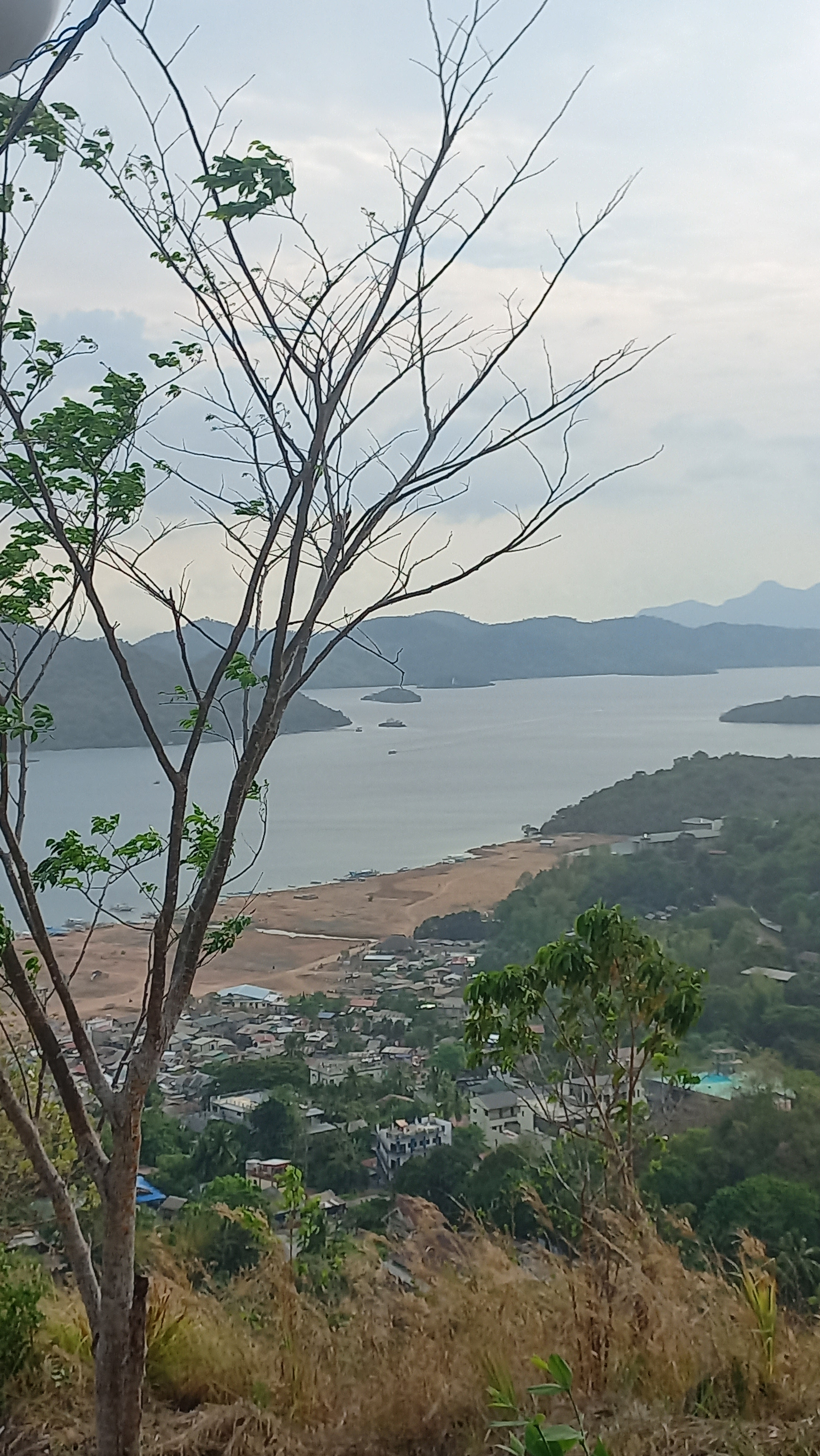
Reclaimed coastal area in Coron, Palawan, Philippines. The bare, brown-colored reclaimed land stands out from the original vegetated coastside, as seen from atop Mt. Tapyas.

Qatar

- A part of the Hamad International Airport, around 36 square kilometres (14 sq mi).
- The entire Pearl Island situated in West Bay (Doha).

Singapore

- The city-state of Singapore, where land is in short supply, is also famous for its efforts on land reclamation.
- The size of Singapore has increased by 25% from 581.5 square kilometres in 1960 to 725.7 in 2019. This is part of the nation's plans to create more homes and common spaces in the land-scarce city-state. Upcoming projects include the Long Island project, involving the reclamation of three tracts of land (expected to span around 800 ha), which is set at a higher level to protect against rising sea levels. It will also enclose a body of water, acting as a reservoir, strengthening the nation's water resilience. Detailed technical studies are currently under way, lasting five years. This project would take a few decades to plan and implement.

South Korea

- Incheon International Airport

Sri Lanka

- Colombo International Financial City

United Arab Emirates

- Some of the coastline of Saadiyat Island which is used for commercial purposes.
- The Palm Islands, The World and hotel Burj al-Arab off Dubai.
- The Yas Island in Abu Dhabi.

=== Europe ===
Belarus

- The southwestern residential area in Brest.

Belgium

- The port of Zeebrugge.

Denmark

- Certain areas of Denmark.

Estonia

- Paljassaare, Tallinn is a peninsula consisting of two former islands connected to the mainland during the 20th century
- Port of Tallinn is largely built on land reclaimed over centuries.

Finland

- Helsinki (of which the major part of the city center is built on reclaimed land).

France

- Airport of Nice.

Greece

- A big part of Kavala.
- Lake Copais.

Ireland

- Parts of Dublin, including the North Wall, East Wall, Grand Canal Dock and Bull Island.

Italy

- The airport peninsula, the industrial area of Cornigliano, the PSA container terminal and other parts of the port in Genoa.
- Venice.
- Rione Orsini, part of Borgo Santa Lucia, Naples.
- Fucine Lake.

Monaco

- Almost half of the microstate of Monaco
  - Most of Fontvieille, Monaco
  - Parts surrounding Port Hercules in La Condamine, Monaco

Netherlands

- Large parts of the Netherlands.

Norway

- Parts of Bryggen, Bergen including the Dreggekaien cruise terminal and other ship services.

Russia

- Parts of Saint Petersburg, such as the Marine Facade.

Spain

- Barceloneta area, Barcelona.

Turkey

- Airports of Trabzon, Giresun and Rize.
- Coastal parks and streets of Istanbul
- Yenikapı.

United Kingdom

- England
  - Pier Head, Liverpool.
  - Samphire Hoe in Kent was created using 4.9 million cubic metres of chalk marl from the nearby Channel Tunnel excavations from 1988 to 1994.
  - Almost all of the banks of the lower River Thames, including parts of London.
  - The Fens in East Anglia.
- Northern Ireland
  - Most of Belfast Harbour and areas of Belfast.
- Scotland
  - The entire waterfront area of Dundee.

Jersey

- Waterfront Centre, St. Helier

Ukraine

- Majority of left-bank and some right-bank residential areas of Kyiv were built on a reclaimed fens and floodplains of the Dnieper river.

=== North America ===
Bahamas

- The Potter's Cay in Nassau was connected to the island of New Providence.
- The shore of Nassau, especially along East Bay street.

Bermuda

- Much of Bermuda's St David's Island is reclaimed; the island, the site of Bermuda's international airport, was formerly several smaller islands.

Canada

- Notre Dame Island in Montreal. In the Saint Lawrence River, 15 million tons of rock were excavated from the Montreal Metro underground rail in 1965 to form an artificial island.
- Leslie Street Spit, the downtown waterfront south of Front Street, and sections of the Toronto Islands along with the Billy Bishop City Airport in Toronto.
- Part of Nuns' Island in Montreal.
- Infilling False Creek, Burrard Inlet and various creekways of Vancouver.
- Tsawwassen ferry terminal causeway in Delta.
- Wreck Beach, Metro Vancouver Electoral Area A

Mexico

- Mexico City (which is situated at the former site of Lake Texcoco); the chinampas are a famous example.

United States

- The Chicago shoreline.
- The Northwestern University Lakefill, part of the campus of Northwestern University in Evanston, Illinois.
- Several neighborhoods in Boston, Massachusetts including Back Bay are the result of landfill.
- Several islands in Biscayne Bay in the Miami metropolitan area, including the Venetian Islands, are the result of landfill.
- Brooklyn Bridge Park, Brooklyn.
- Much of the Hudson Waterfront in Hudson County, New Jersey including MOTBY, Port Jersey, Ellis Island, Liberty State Park, much Downtown Jersey City, and Hoboken.
- Parts of Newark Bay and the New Jersey Meadowlands including Port Newark, Newark Airport, and the Meadowlands Sports Complex
- Parts of New Orleans (which is partially built on land that was once swamp).
- Much of the urbanized area adjacent to San Francisco Bay, including most of San Francisco's waterfront and Financial District, San Francisco International Airport, the Port of Oakland, and large portions of the city of Alameda has been reclaimed from the bay. The entirety of Treasure Island was also reclaimed to cover over the shallow waters north of Yerba Buena Island that presented a navigational hazard.
- Large hills in Seattle were removed and used to create Harbor Island and reclaim land along Elliott Bay. In particular, the neighborhoods of SoDo and Interbay are largely built on filled wetlands.

=== Oceania ===
Australia

- Most of Barangaroo, a commercial and residential suburb in the central business district of Sydney, New South Wales.
- Areas of Darling Harbour, a locality west of the Sydney central business district.
- A large portion of the southern suburb of Sylvania Waters in Sydney.
- Runway 16L/34R and the southern half of runway 16R/34L at Sydney Airport.
- Large portions of Brisbane Airport, including the newest runway, 01L/19R.
- Large portions of Port Botany in metropolitan Sydney.
- The majority of the Port of Brisbane, formerly the Fisherman Islands archipelago.
- Large areas of the Melbourne Docklands.
- Portions of the Swan River foreshore adjoining the Perth central business district in Western Australia, including the entirety of Mounts Bay (pictured above).

Fiji

- My Suva park, a recreation park for the Greater Suva area.

New Zealand

- Considerable areas of Dunedin, New Zealand, including the "Southern Endowment", stretching from the central city to the southeastern suburbs along the shore of Otago Harbour.
- Prior to the Napier earthquake of 1931, significant reclamation of the then-lagoon was undertaken in areas of Napier South and Ahuriri. There were also minor reclamation works undertaken after 1931 on the new low-lying lands brought up by the earthquake.
- Areas around Wellington and Auckland's harbours and airports have also been reclaimed.

=== South America ===
Argentina

- The entire riverfront of Buenos Aires, including the port and an airport.

Brazil

- Large parts of Rio de Janeiro, most notably several blocks in the new docks area, the entire Flamengo Park and the neighborhood of Urca.
- Parts of Florianópolis.
- Parts of the Historic District of Porto Alegre, including the docks of Port of Porto Alegre and the Beira-Rio Stadium, were built on reclaimed lands of Lake Guaíba between the end of the 19th century and the 1970s.

Chile

- Parts of Valparaíso.

Colombia

- Santa Cruz del Islote, in the Caribbean Sea of Colombia, one of the most densely populated islands in the world, was built in an artificial way gaining land from the sea.

Panama

- Parts of Panama City urban and street development are based on reclaimed land, using material extracted from Panama Canal excavations.
- The Cinta Costera, in Panama City.

Uruguay

- Parts of Montevideo, Rambla Sur and several projects still going on in Montevideo's Bay.

Venezuela

- Parts of the Vargas State in the north of Venezuela, parts of Los Monjes Archipelago, the Isla Paraíso in the Anzoátegui State and the La Salina island in the Zulia State, were built with land reclaimed from the sea.

== Agriculture ==
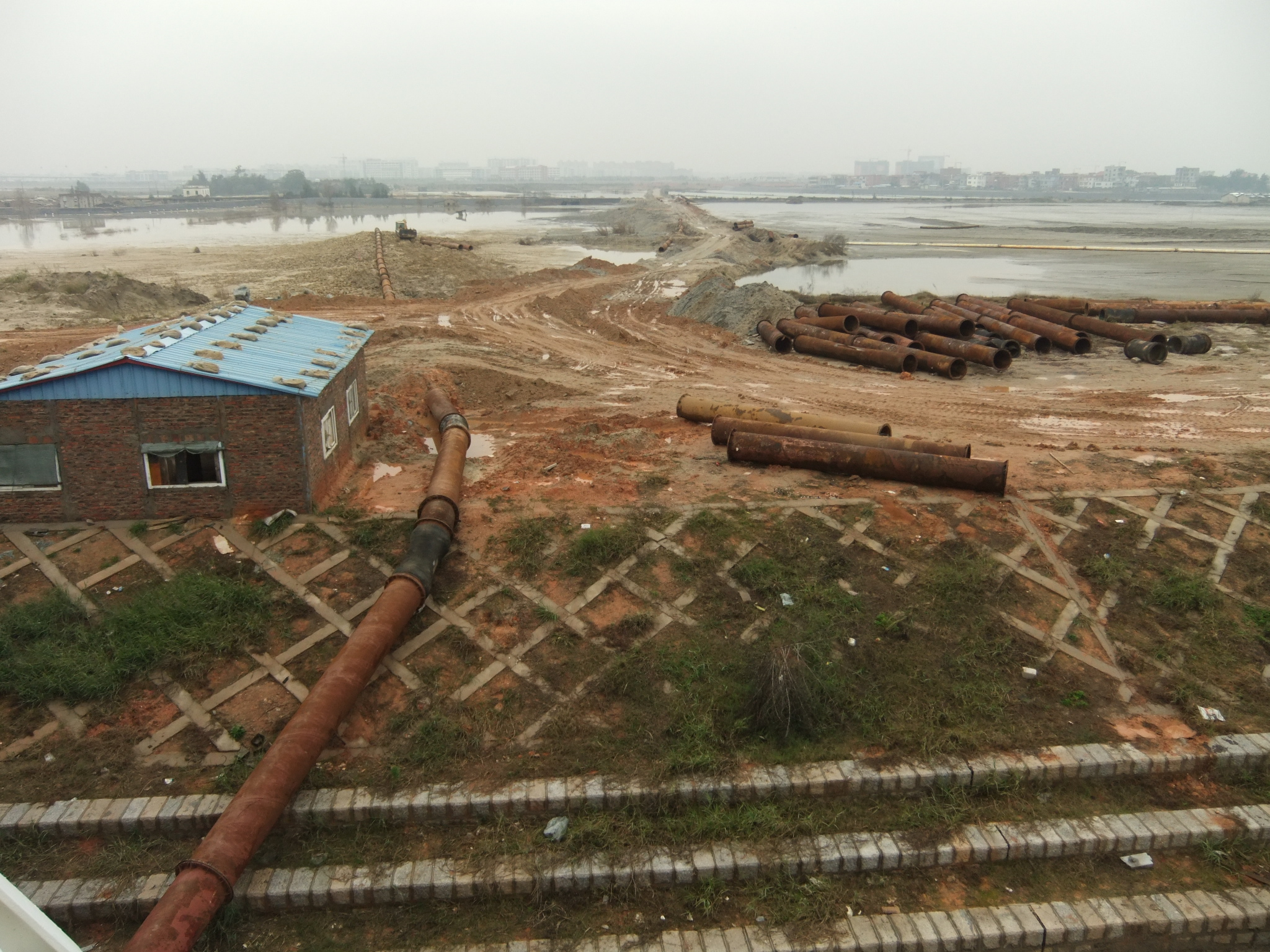
Land reclamation in progress in Bingzhou (丙州) Peninsula (formerly, island) of the Dongzui Bay (东咀港). Tong'an District, Xiamen, China

Agriculture was a driver of land reclamation before industrialisation. In South China, farmers reclaimed paddy fields by enclosing an area with a stone wall on the sea shore near a river mouth or river delta. The species of rice that are grown on these grounds are more salt tolerant. Another use of such enclosed land is the creation of fish ponds. It is commonly seen on the Pearl River Delta and Hong Kong. These reclaimed areas also attract species of migrating birds.

A related practice is the draining of swampy or seasonally submerged wetlands to convert them to farmland. While this does not create new land exactly, it allows commercially productive use of land that would otherwise be restricted to wildlife habitat. It is also an important method of mosquito control.

Even in the post-industrial age, there have been land reclamation projects intended for increasing available agricultural land. For example, the village of Ogata in Akita, Japan, was established on land reclaimed from Lake Hachirōgata (Japan's second largest lake at the time) starting in 1957. By 1977, the amount of land reclaimed totalled 172.03 square kilometres (66.42 sq mi).

== Artificial islands ==
Artificial islands are an example of land reclamation. Creating an artificial island is an expensive and risky undertaking. It is often considered in places with high population density and a scarcity of flat land. Kansai International Airport (in Osaka) and Hong Kong International Airport are examples where this process was deemed necessary. The Palm Islands, The World and hotel Burj al-Arab off Dubai in the United Arab Emirates are other examples of artificial islands (although there is yet no real "scarcity of land" in Dubai), as well as the Flevopolder in the Netherlands which is the largest artificial island in the world.

== Beach restoration ==
Beach rebuilding is the process of repairing beaches using materials such as sand or mud from inland. This can be used to build up beaches suffering from beach starvation or erosion from longshore drift. It stops the movement of the original beach material through longshore drift and retains a natural look to the beach. Although it is not a long-lasting solution, it is cheap compared to other types of coastal defences. An example of this is the city of Mumbai.

== Landfill ==
As human overcrowding of developed areas intensified during the 20th century, it has become important to develop land re-use strategies for completed landfills. Some of the most common usages are for parks, golf courses and other sports fields. Increasingly, however, office buildings and industrial uses are made on a completed landfill. In these latter uses, methane capture is customarily carried out to minimize explosive hazard within the building.

An example of a Class A office building constructed over a landfill is the Dakin Building at Sierra Point, Brisbane, California. The underlying fill was deposited from 1965 to 1985, mostly consisting of construction debris from San Francisco and some municipal wastes. Aerial photographs prior to 1965 show this area to be tidelands of the San Francisco Bay. A clay cap was constructed over the debris prior to building approval.

A notable example is Sydney Olympic Park, the primary venue for the 2000 Summer Olympic Games, which was built atop an industrial wasteland that included landfills.

Another strategy for landfill is the incineration of landfill trash at high temperature via the plasma-arc gasification process, which is currently used at two facilities in Japan, and was proposed to be used at a facility in St. Lucie County, Florida. The planned facility in Florida was later canceled.

== Environmental impact ==
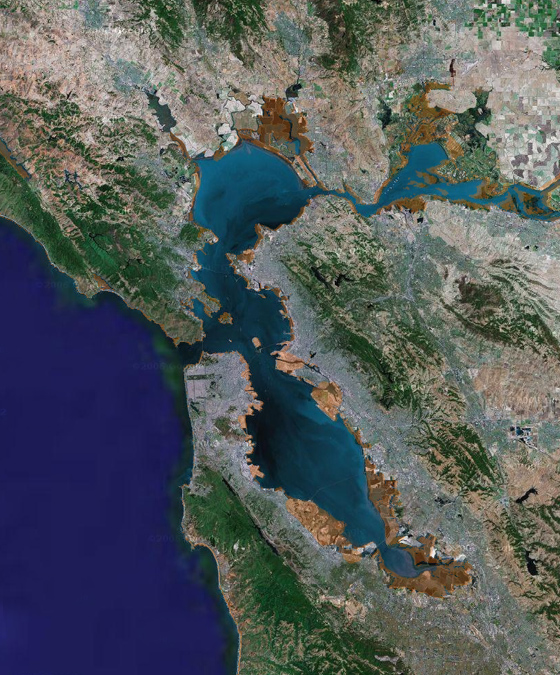
Parts (highlighted in brown) of the San Francisco Bay were reclaimed from wetlands for urban use.

Draining wetlands for ploughing, for example, is a form of habitat destruction. In some parts of the world, new reclamation projects are restricted or no longer allowed, due to environmental protection laws. Reclamation projects have strong negative impacts on coastal populations, although some species can take advantage of the newly created area. A 2022 global analysis estimated that 39% of losses (approximately 5,300 km^{2} or 2,000 mi^{2}) and 14% of gains (approximately 1,300 km^{2} or 500 mi^{2}) of tidal wetlands (mangroves, tidal flats, and tidal marshes) between 1999 and 2019 were due to direct human activities, including conversion to aquaculture, agriculture, plantations, coastal developments and other physical structures.

=== Environmental legislation ===
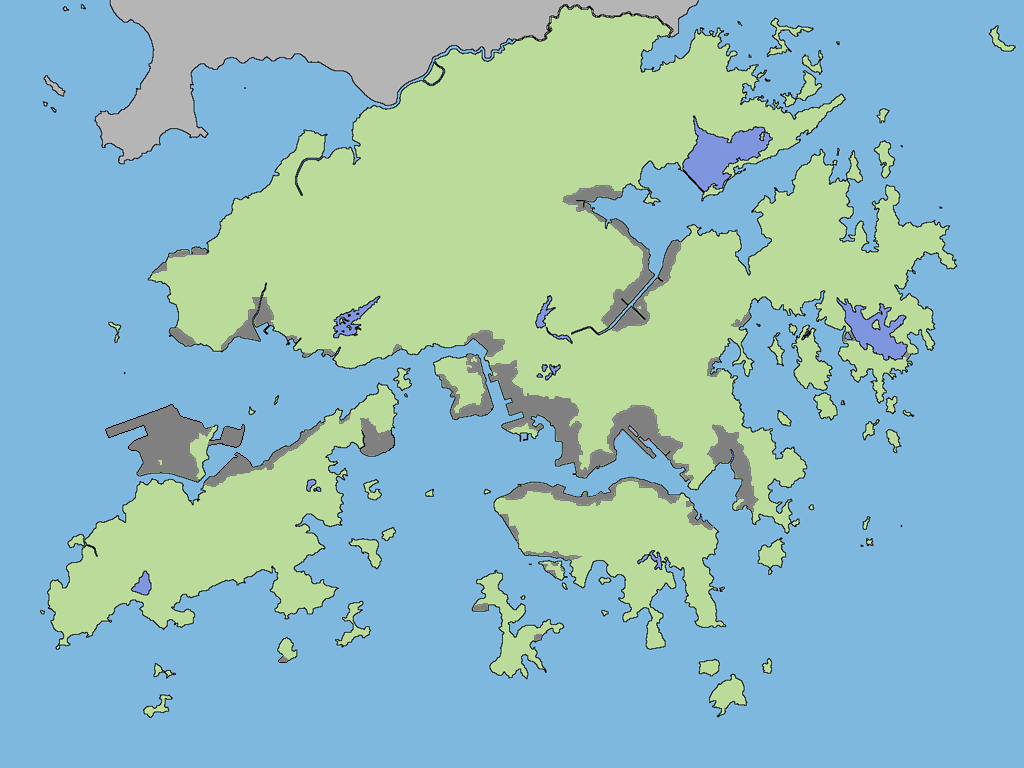
A map of reclaimed land (grey area) in Hong Kong. Many of the urban areas of Hong Kong are on reclaimed land.

The State of California created a state commission, the San Francisco Bay Conservation and Development Commission, in 1965 to protect San Francisco Bay and regulate development near its shores. The commission was created in response to growing concern over the shrinking size of the bay.

Hong Kong legislators passed the Protection of the Harbour Ordinance, proposed by the Society for Protection of the Harbour, in 1997 in an effort to safeguard the increasingly threatened Victoria Harbour against encroaching land development. Several large reclamation schemes at Green Island, West Kowloon, and Kowloon Bay were subsequently shelved, and others reduced in size.

== Dangers ==
Reclaimed land is highly susceptible to soil liquefaction during earthquakes, which can amplify the amount of damage that occurs to buildings and infrastructure. Subsidence is another issue, both from soil compaction on filled land, and also when wetlands are enclosed by levees and drained to create polders. Drained marshes will eventually sink below the surrounding water level, increasing the danger from flooding.

== Land amounts added ==
=== Asia ===
Country or territory	Notes
Bahrain	76.3% of original size of 410 km^{2} (160 sq mi) (1931–2007).
Bangladesh	About 110 km^{2} (42 sq mi) in total and has 12,000 square kilometres (4,600 sq mi) potential (8% of total area) up to 12 metres (39 ft) depth in the territorial sea area.
Hong Kong	Main article: Land reclamation in Hong Kong 67 km^{2} (26 sq mi) of land was reclaimed up to 2013. Praya Reclamation Scheme began in the late 1860s and consisted of two stages totaling 20 to 24 hectares (50 to 60 acres). Hong Kong Disneyland, Hong Kong International Airport, and its predecessor, Kai Tak Airport, were all built on reclaimed land. In addition, much reclamation has taken place in prime locations on the waterfront on both sides of Victoria Harbour. This has raised environmental issues of the protection of the harbour which was once the source of prosperity of Hong Kong, traffic congestion in the Central District, as well as the collusion of the Hong Kong Government with the real estate developers in the territory. In addition, as the city expanded, new towns in different decades were mostly built on reclaimed land, such as Kwun Tong, Sha Tin-Ma On Shan, Tai Po, Tseung Kwan O, Tuen Mun, and West Kowloon.
India	Mumbai – An archipelago of originally seven separate islands were joined by land reclamation over a span of five centuries. This was done to develop Mumbai as a harbour city.
Indonesia	Jakarta – Giant Sea Wall Jakarta is part of a massive coastal development project at Jakarta Bay.
Japan	Tokyo Bay – 249 km^{2} (96 sq mi) including the entirety of Odaiba artificial island.; Kobe – 23 km^{2} (8.9 sq mi) (1995).
Macao	170% of the original size or 17 km^{2} (6.6 sq mi)
North Korea	In the 1980s, North Korea commenced a "find new land" program to reclaim 300,000 hectares of land (3,000 km^{2} or 1,160 mi^{2}) in order to expand the country's supply of arable land. The project was unsuccessful and only reclaimed 20,000 hectares (200 km^{2} or 70 mi^{2}) by the time it was cancelled after the death of Kim Il-sung in 1994. It also contributed to the collapse of the North Korean economy and the subsequent famine in the 1990s. Land reclamation efforts resumed in the 2010s under Kim Jong-un with more success. North Korea constructed artificial islands in the Yellow Sea containing Korean People's Army bases, possibly inspired by Chinese artificial islands in the South China Sea and possibly as bases for long-range ballistic missiles.
Philippines	Manila Bay; Main article: Land reclamation in Metro Manila Additional 626 hectares along the eastern coast of Manila Bay created in the 1990s to the 88-hectare Cultural Center of the Philippines Complex. The shore road of Manila (Roxas Boulevard) is actually reclaimed land, as well as its extension road to Cavite (Manila-Cavite Expressway / Aguinaldo Boulevard).: Cebu South Road Properties, Cebu City, Philippines - Artificial island which is 300 hectares was built along the sea between Mainland Cebu and Kawit Island. This was done to address the increasing need of urban and residential development in Cebu City due to its very progressive economy.; New Manila International Airport, Bulakan, Philippines
Singapore	Main article: Land reclamation in Singapore 20 percent of the original size or 135 km^{2} (52 sq mi). As of 2003, plans for 99 km^{2} (38 sq mi) more are to go ahead, even though disputes persist with Malaysia over Singapore's extensive land reclamation works. Parts of Changi Airport are also on reclaimed land.
South Korea	As of 2006, 38 percent or 1,550 km^{2} (600 sq mi) of coastal wetlands reclaimed, including 400 km^{2} (150 sq mi) at Saemangeum. Songdo International Business district, the largest private development in history, is a large-scale reclamation project built entirely on tidal mudflats.
United Arab Emirates	Main article: Land reclamation in the United Arab Emirates Dubai has a total of four reclaimed islands (the Palm Jumeirah, Jebal Ali, The Burj al Arab Island, and The World Islands), with a fifth under construction (the Palm Deira). There are several human-made islands in Abu Dhabi, such as Yas Island and Al Lulu Island.

=== Europe ===
Country	Notes
Monaco	Main article: Land reclamation in Monaco 0.41 km^{2} (0.16 sq mi) out of 2.05 km^{2} (0.79 sq mi), or one fifth of Monaco comes from land taken from the sea, mainly in the neighborhoods of Fontvieille, La Condamine, and Larvotto/Bas Moulins.
Netherlands	Main article: Land reclamation in the Netherlands About 1/6 (almost 17%) of the entire country, or about 7,000 km^{2} (2,700 sq mi) in total, has been reclaimed from the sea, lakes, marshes and swamps. The province of Flevoland has almost completely been reclaimed from the Zuiderzee.

=== Other countries ===
Country	Notes
New Zealand	Significant areas of land totaling several hundred hectares have been reclaimed along the harbourfronts of Auckland, Dunedin, and Wellington. In Dunedin – which in its early days was nicknamed "Mudedin" – around 2.5 km^{2} (0.97 sq mi), including much of the inner city and suburbs of Dunedin North, South Dunedin, and Andersons Bay is reclaimed from the Otago Harbour, and a similar area in the suburbs of St Clair and St Kilda is reclaimed swampland. The international airports serving Auckland and Wellington have had significant reclamation for runway use.
Nigeria	Eko Atlantic, Lagos – 25 square kilometers

== List of reclaimed land by country and territory ==
Country or territory	Reclaimed land (km^{2})	Notes
China	13,500+	Land reclamation in China
Netherlands	7,000	Flevoland, de Beemster, Afsluitdijk; Land reclamation in the Netherlands
South Korea	1,550	
United States	1,000+	Artificial islands of the United States
Japan	500+	
United Arab Emirates	470	Land reclamation in the United Arab Emirates
Bahrain	410	Land reclamation in Bahrain
Singapore	135	Land reclamation in Singapore
Bangladesh	110	
Hong Kong	67	Land reclamation in Hong Kong
Qatar	35	
Macau	17	Land reclamation in Macau
Philippines	9.26	Cebu South Road Properties Central Business District and Land reclamation in Metro Manila
New Zealand	3.3	Reclamation of Wellington Harbour
Sri Lanka	2.33	Colombo International Financial City
South Africa	1.94	Cape Town Foreshore
Maldives	0.62	Velana International Airport
Monaco	0.41	Land reclamation in Monaco

== See also ==
- Artificial island
- Great Wall of Sand
- Marine regression – the formation of new land by reductions in sea level
- Drainage system (agriculture) – drainage for land reclamation
- Land improvement
- Land recycling
  - Hong Kong Society for Protection of the Harbour
- Mine reclamation
- Polder – low-lying land reclaimed from a lake or sea
- Reclamation of Wellington Harbour
- River reclamation
- Water reclamation
- Rainbowing
