= Land reclamation in Bahrain =

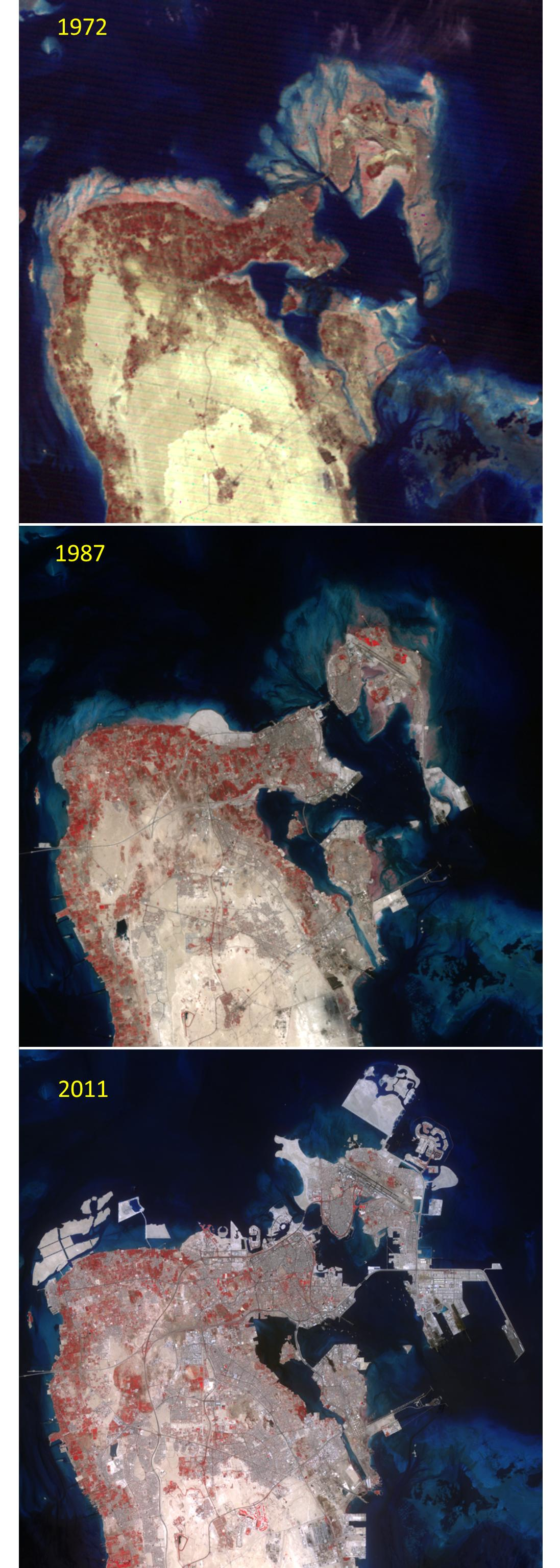
Satellite images of Bahrain showing evolution of land reclamation projects.

Land reclamation in Bahrain dates back to the 20th century and extends well into the 21st century. Between 1987 and 2013, 80 square kilometres of reclaimed land was added to the country's land area, representing an increase of 12.5%. An extreme example of this is the land area of Muharraq island increasing by 155% due to land reclamation. Reasons for land reclamation utilisation in the country include a rapidly increasing population, increased economic development needs, and limited land availability. Further land reclamation is expected as Bahrain's Economic Vision 2030 master plan promotes a significant number of land reclamation projects.

== History ==
The earliest modern utilisation of land reclamation in Bahrain dates back to 1912 when plans were announced for construction of a gateway and pier alongside the north of the city of Manama, termed Mina Manama. This would later be the foundation for the construction of Bab al Bahrain. Following the discovery of oil in Bahrain in 1932, rapid urbanisation to the country's urban core in Manama expedited land reclamation focused centred around the Government Avenue road (Arabic: شارع الحكومة) which became the new de facto coastline. Academics critiqued this as being the first example of public footpath access to coastlines being restricted by the priortisation of automobiles and roadway infrastructure as part of oil-driven modernisation. In 1936, the first causeway between Manama and the nearby island of Muharraq was constructed.

The 1960s saw the establishment of a ringroad system around the capital Manama which connected to the newly developed Mina Salman industrial sea port, a site of land reclamation along the Manama peninsula southern coast. By the 1980s, land reclamation appeared outside Manama particularly in Seef, the Diplomatic Area, the Hidd dry docks.

Bahrain's land area in 1981 was 665 km^{2} which had increased to 741 km^{2} by 2007 as a result of land reclamation, representing an 11% increase in land area and corresponding to 76 km^{2} of land reclaimed in 26 years. In 2005, an estimated three-quarters of the Juffair district's land area was reclaimed from the sea. In 2008, the Bahraini Ministry of Works has published official guidelines on land reclamation and dredging in the country.

== Geography ==
The vast majority of land reclamation projects in Bahrain are concentrated along the northern and eastern coastlines of the main Bahrain Island, alongside Muharraq island and Sitra island. This is primarily due to the shallow depth of the sea beds or reefs (termed locally as fasht) which regularly dry out at noon with the hot and arid climate, regularly leading to tidal flats.

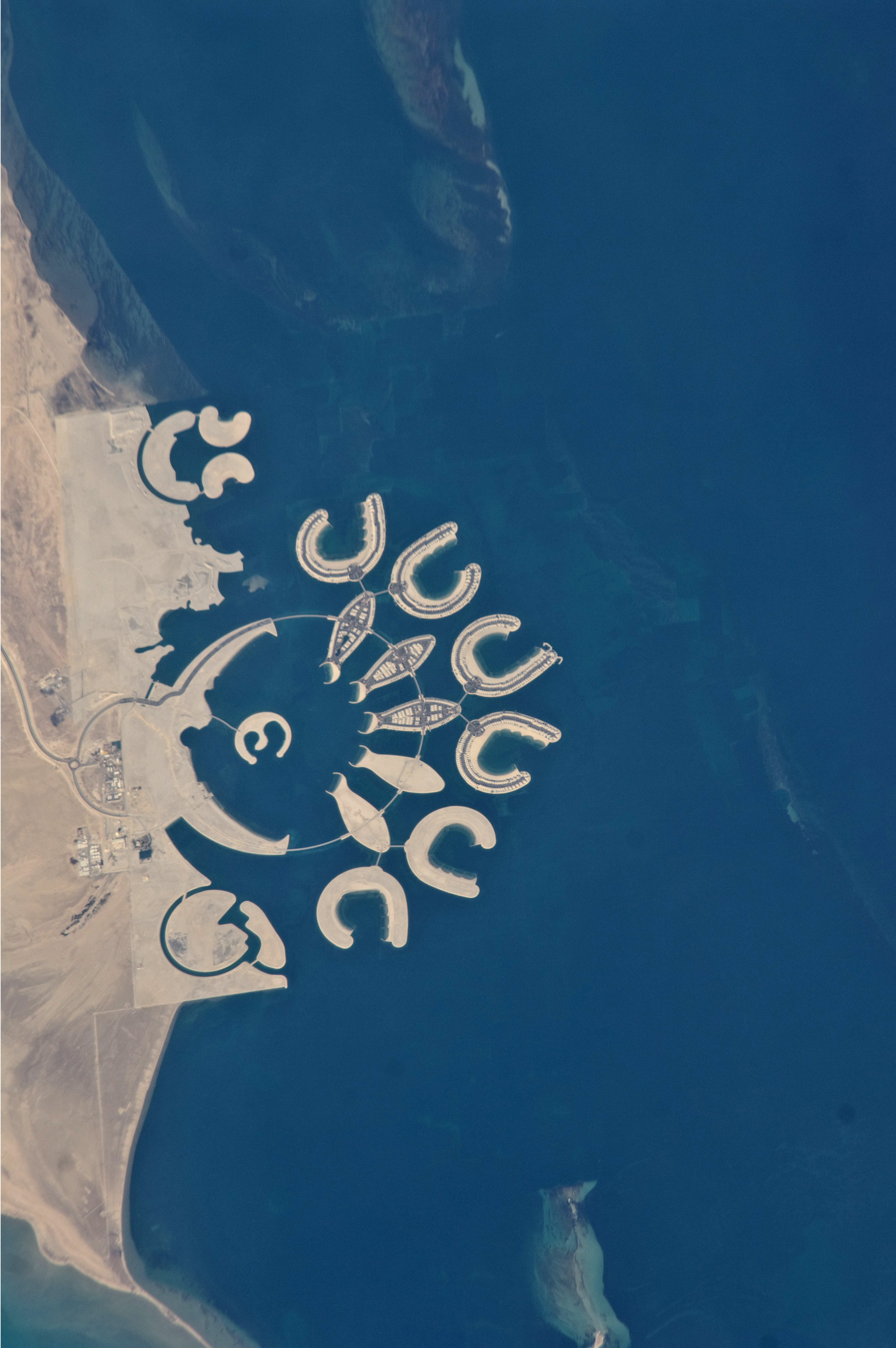
Durrat al Bahrain.

=== Projects ===
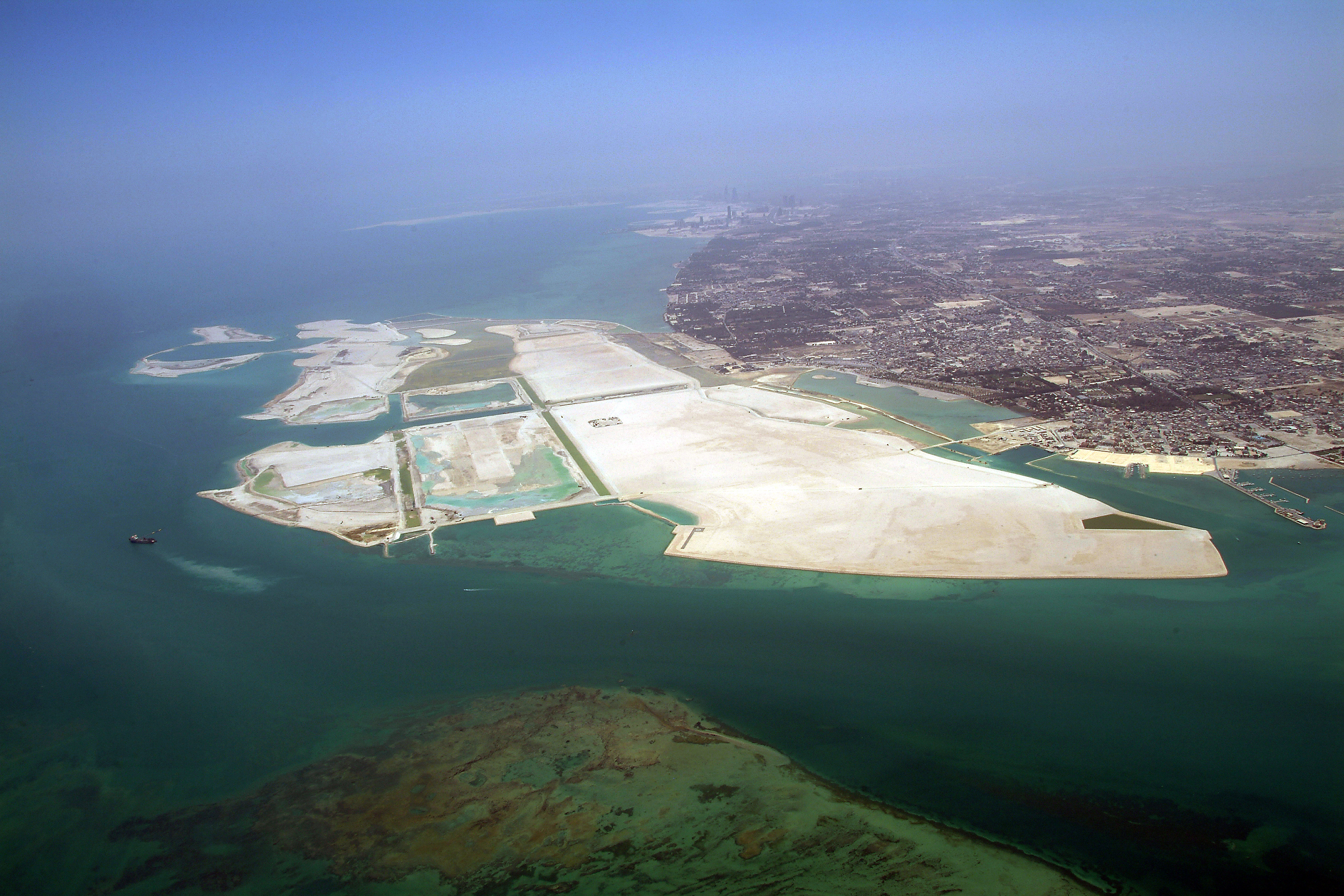
Salman Town reclamation project in 2007.

- The King Fahd Causeway project to Saudi Arabia included the creation of an artificial Passport Island to serve as a border crossing between the two nations.
- The Shaikh Khalifa bin Salman causeway connecting southern Manama and Mina Salman on the Bahraini mainland to Hidd on Muharraq island. The project involved significant land reclamation including the construction of a new artificial island called Prince Khalifa Bin Salman Island.
- Amwaj Islands - a mixed-use luxurious real estate project of 6 artificial islands reclaimed northeast of Muharraq island in 2003, it was marketed towards foreign investors of waterfront property.
- Bahrain Bay - a mixed residential and commercial district along the north coast of Manama.
- Bahrain Financial Harbour - a commercial complex built on reclaimed land in Manama.
- Diyar Al Muharraq - a 1,200 hectare archipelago of reclaimed land situated north of Muharraq island, adjacent to Amwaj islands.
- Dilmunia island - 1.4 km^{2} of reclaimed land east of Muharraq island.
- Durrat al Bahrain - a series of 15 man-made islands in the far southeastern tip of the main Bahrain island.
- East Sitra City - a social housing project built on reclaimed land off the eastern coast of Sitra.
- East Hidd City - a social housing project built on reclaimed land east of Hidd.
- Salman Town - an artificial series of islands home to social housing for up to 90,000 people, situated on the northwest shoreline of Bahrain.
- Reef Island - an artificial island in Seef.
- Seef - a commercial district west of Manama that was built on reclaimed land.

== Environmental concerns ==
Land reclamation is known to have significant effects on marine ecology. A 2013 study on fishing in Bahrain reported reductions in quantities of rabbitfish (Safi), spanish mackerel (Chan'ad), grouper (Hamour), and spangled emperor (Sha'ree) in the northern waters of Bahrain, the site of the highest concentration of land reclamation in the country.

An estimated 95% of the native mangrove forests in Bahrain are thought to have been lost due to land reclamation in Bahrain. Tubli Bay, a Ramsar site, shrunk by 40% as a result of land reclamation, leading to significant loss of native mangrove forests. An additional 150 km^{2} of Bahrain's maritime area is believed to have been destroyed due to land reclamation.

== See also ==
- Al Sayah Island - an island presently enveloped by reclaimed land.
- Geography of Bahrain
- Land reclamation in Monaco
- Land reclamation in Singapore
- Land reclamation in Netherlands
- Land reclamation in the United Arab Emirates
- Bahrain administrative reforms of the 1920s
