= Gracefield =

Gracefield may refer to:

== Places ==
- Gracefield, Quebec, a town in Canada
- Gracefield, New Zealand, a suburb of Lower Hutt City
- Gracefield Island, Nigeria

== Other ==
- Gracefield Arts Centre, a gallery in Dumfries, Scotland
- Gracefield Branch, a section of railway line in Lower Hutt, New Zealand
- Gracefield GAA, GAA Club representing the Offaly side of Portarlington

== See also ==
- Grace Field, Australian football player
