= Le Portier =

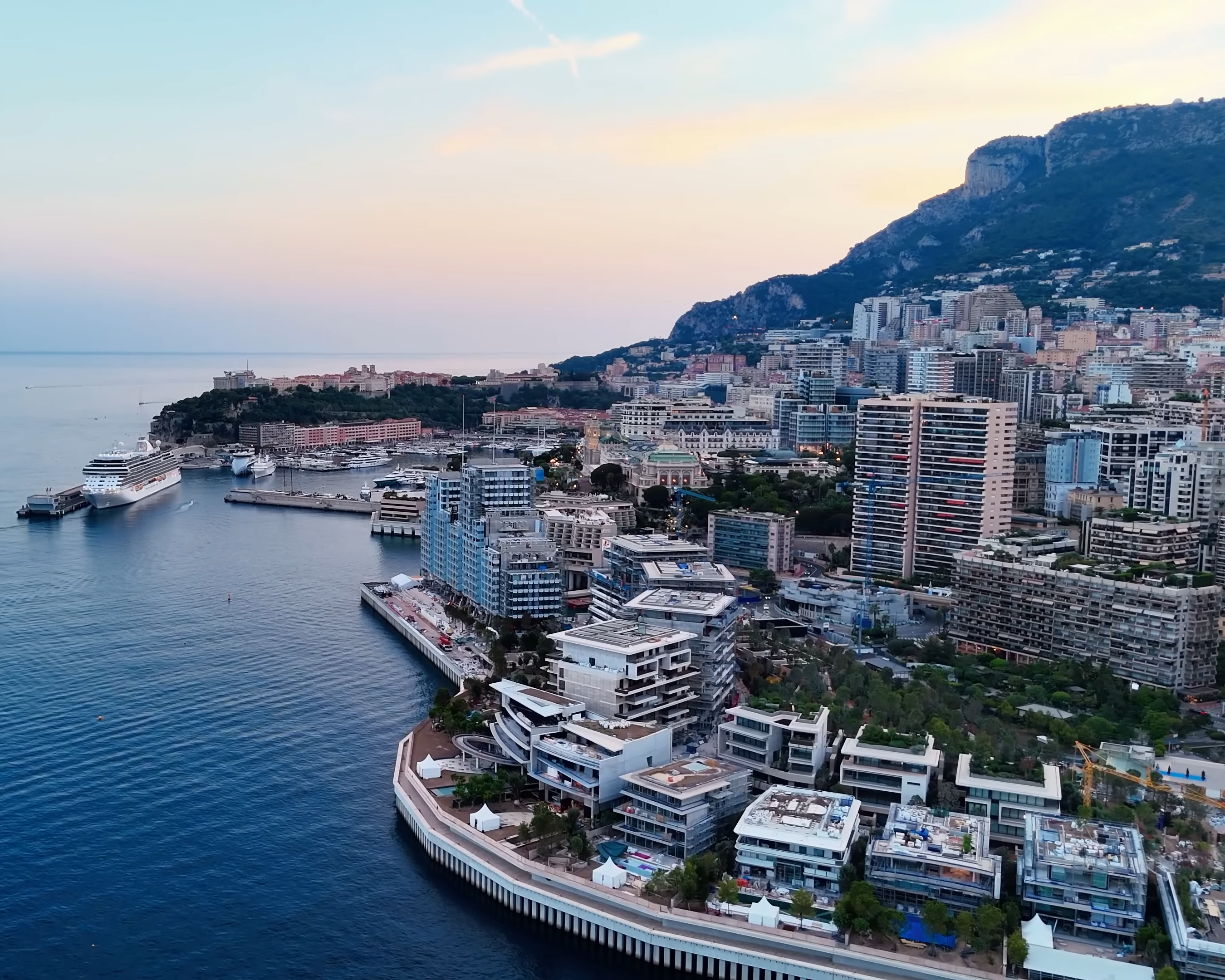
- Mareterra at the bottom
- Interactive map of Le Portier
- Coordinates: 43°44′28″N 7°25′54″E
- Country: Monaco
- Ward: Larvotto

Area
  - Land: 0.06 km^{2} (0.023 sq mi)

Population (2015 forecast)
  - Total: 3,400

Le Portier (French pronunciation: [lə pɔʁtje]), sometimes referred to as Portier Cove or Mareterra, is a residential area opened in December 2024. It forms a part of the Quartier (ward) of Larvotto in the Principality of Monaco.

== History ==
The project, started in the early 2000s and scheduled for 2014, was abandoned in 2009 at the command of Prince Albert II due to the state of the nation's finances. In 2011, new funds were acquired and the project resumed construction. In addition to a new residential area, there were plans to build new administrative buildings, museums and a theatre.

On July 18, 2019, the last of the 18 interlocking concrete caisson was placed, closing the belt that delimits the offshore extension, thus specifically modifying the physical limits of Monaco. On December 16 of that year, construction of the new six-hectare strip was completed.

By the year 2020, work had been completed to reclaim land from the sea in the Mediterranean, leaving the area available for the construction of previously announced projects.

The new neighborhood increased the territory area by 3% and was officially unveiled in December 2024. It comprises two residential apartment buildings, ten villas, four townhouses, a small marina and fourteen commercial spaces, besides three hectares of public spaces. The total cost of the project was € 2 billion.

In a sale completed in 2024, Rinat Akhmetov, often claimed to be Ukraine's richest man, purchased a five-floor apartment with 21 rooms in the “Le Renzo” building. It stretches over approximately 2,500 square meters (27,000 square feet), not counting balconies and terraces looking out over the Mediterranean Sea. It also has a private swimming pool, jacuzzi and comes with at least eight parking spots. The price was indicated to be €471 million ($554 million).

== Geography ==
Le Portier extends between Port Hercules and the Grimaldi Forum, on an area of 6 hectares (15 acres).

Special measures were taken to protect the environment. Nine thousand square meters of solar panels and 200 electric vehicles charging stations were implemented and 800 trees were planted. During the implementation of the foundation caissons on sea, 384 square meters of Posidonia oceanica, an endemic seagrass, were transplanted to the Larvotto Marine Protection Area, 200 meters away from the site.

== Construction ==
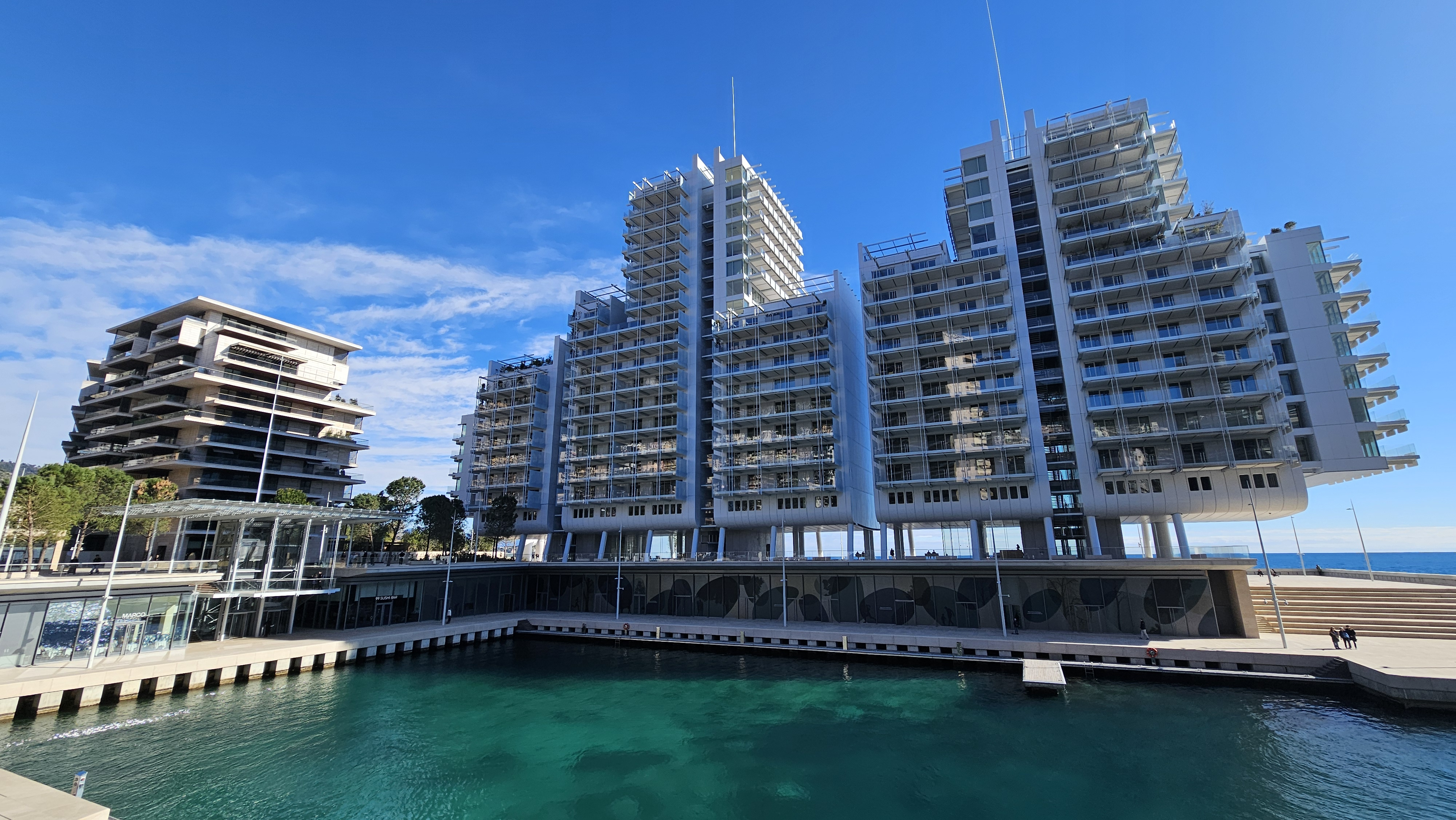
February 2025
(“Le Renzo” building)

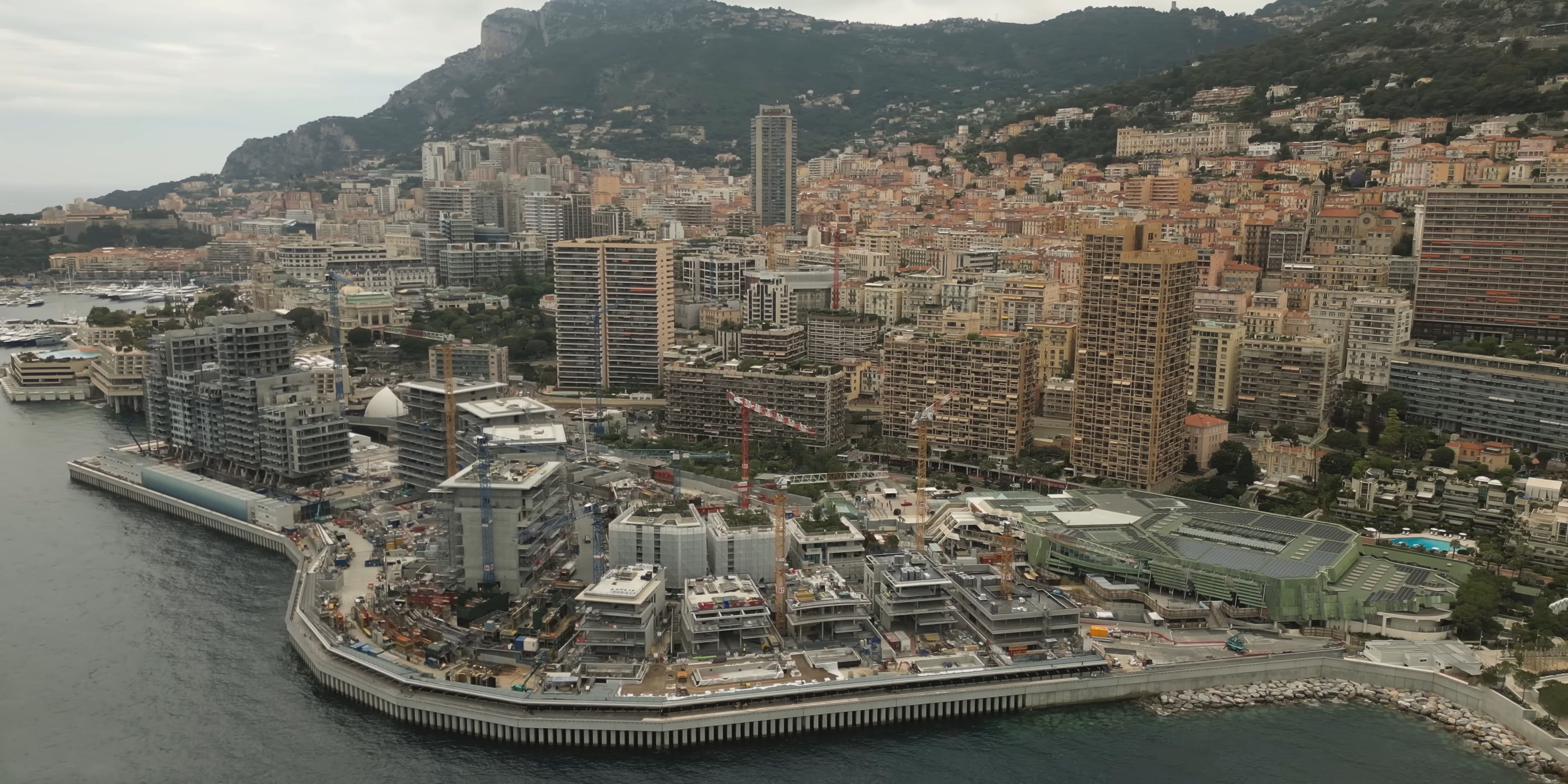
July 2023

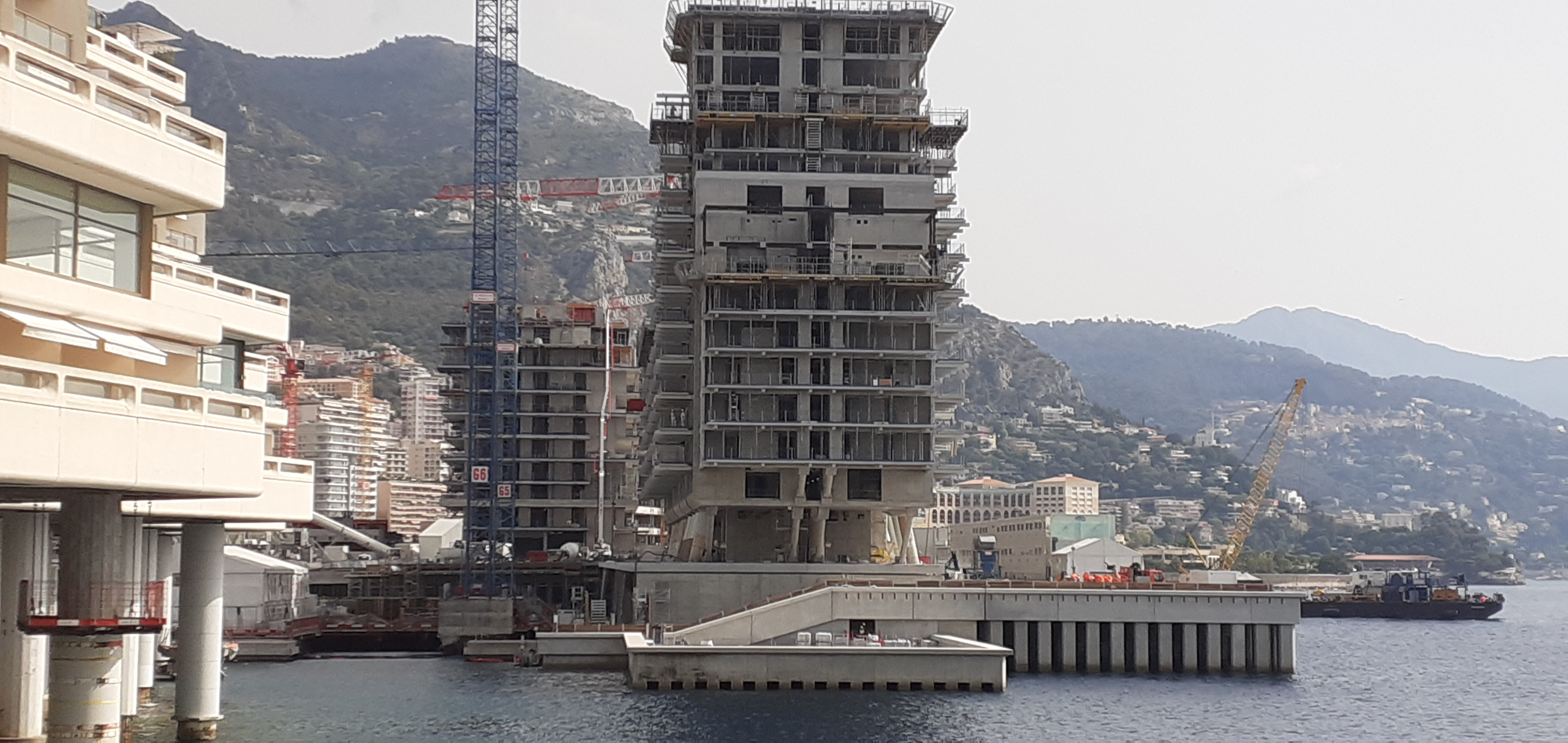
June 2022

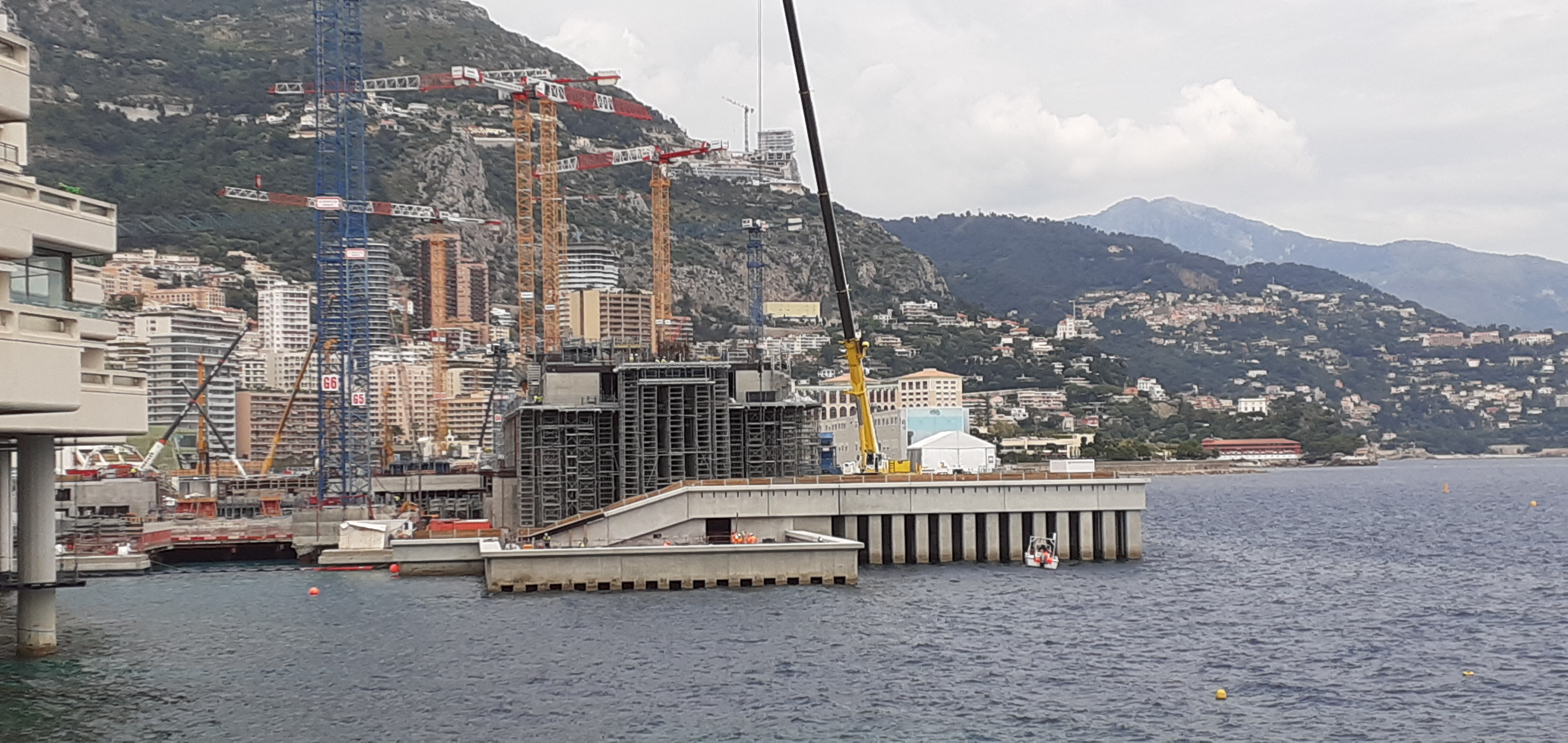
June 2021

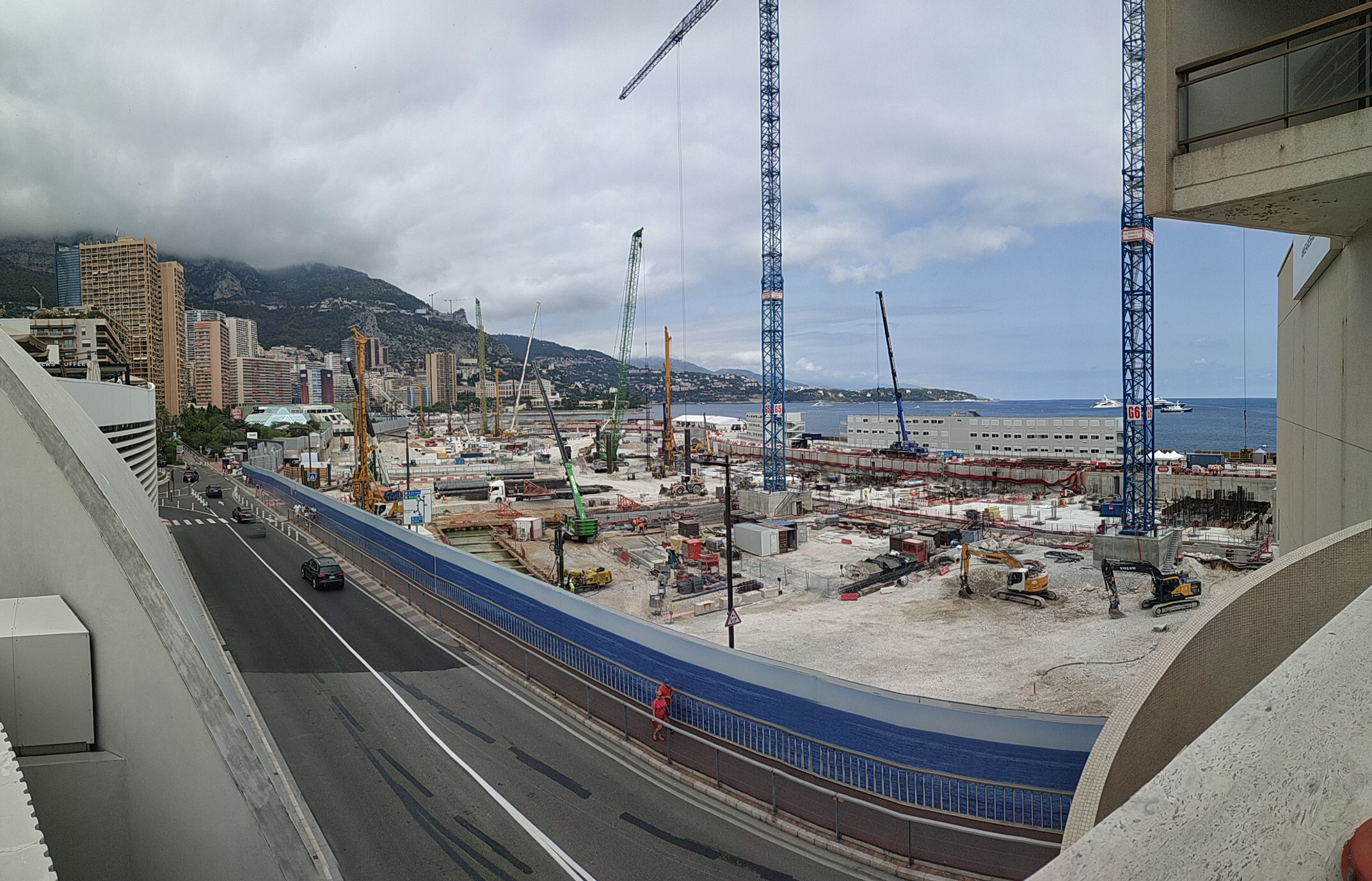
July 2020

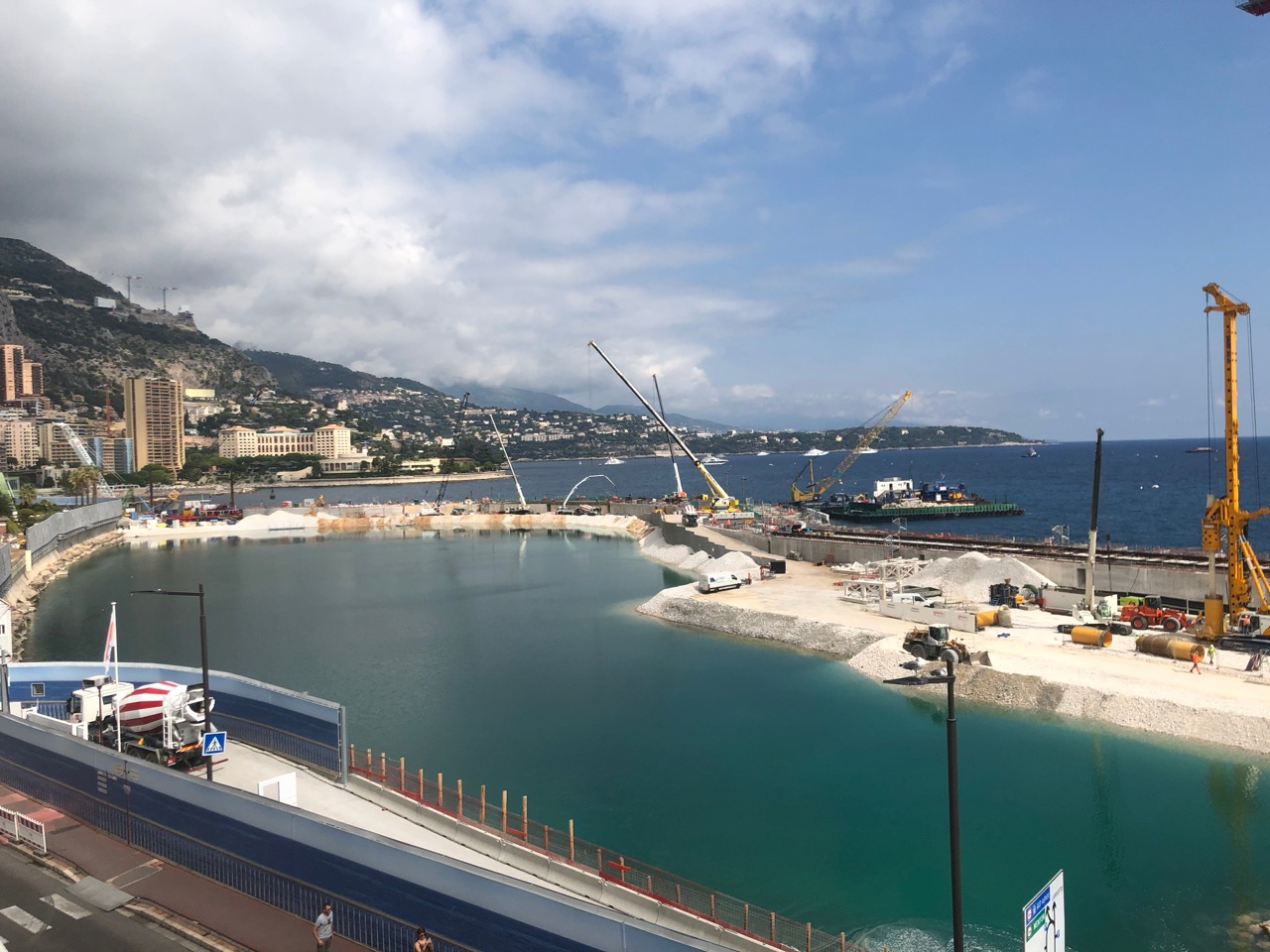
September 2019

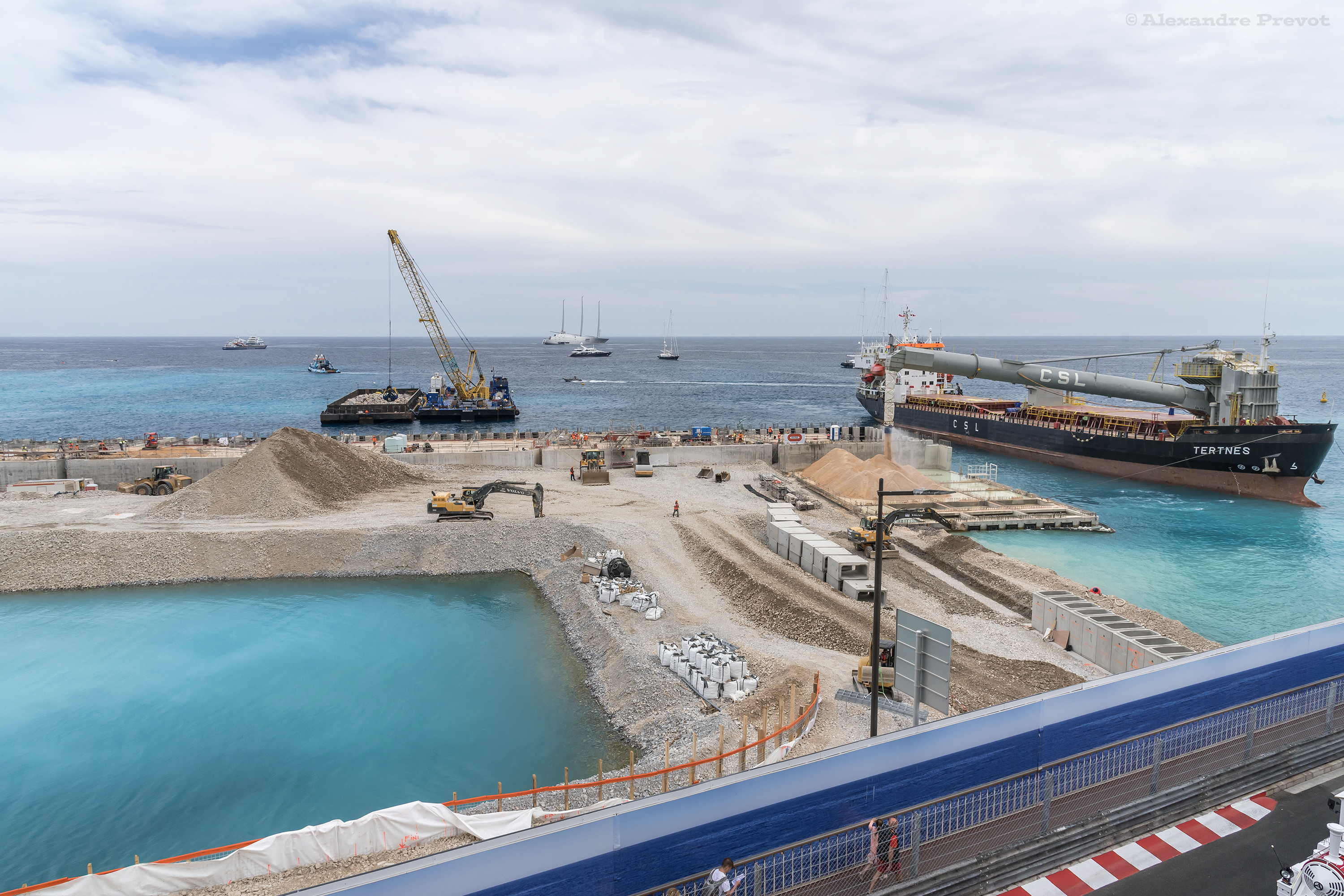
May 2019

== See also ==
- Land reclamation in Monaco
