= Land reclamation in Monaco =

Land reclamation is done in Monaco through a policy of building land in the sea with concrete blocks because land is very scarce, as the country is comparatively tiny, at 2.08 km^{2} (0.80 sq mi). It is the second smallest country in the world, yet it's also the second most densely populated at approximately 18,333 residents per kilometer squared, and is still growing. To solve this problem and to continue economic development, for years the country has added to its total land area by reclaiming land from the sea.

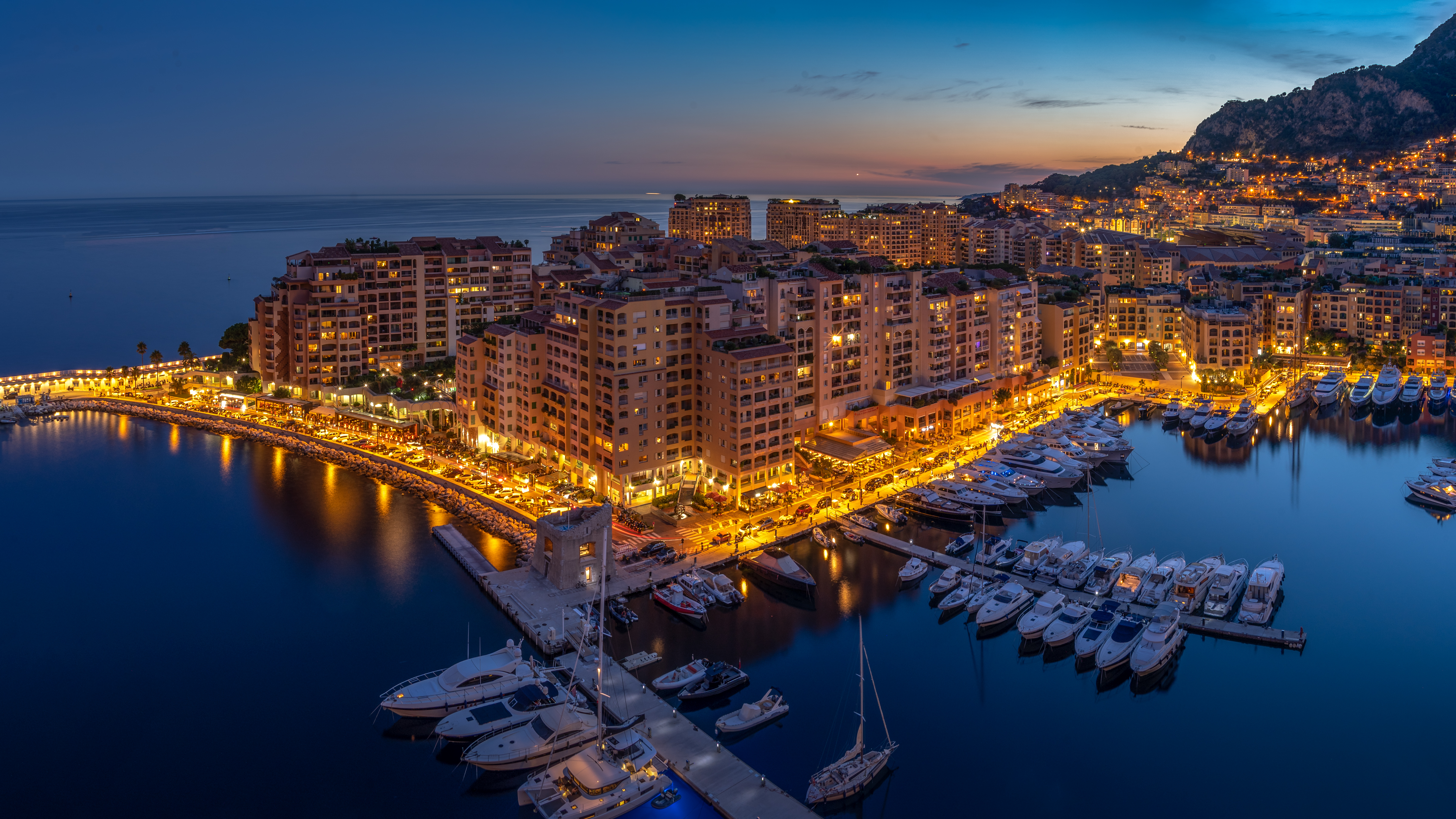
Fontvieille ward, Monaco

== Geography ==
Of Monaco's eleven administrative wards, two are built entirely on reclaimed land. Fontvieille was constructed in the western part of Monaco in the 1970s, and also serves as the newest of the four traditional quartiers (districts) of the principality. Le Portier, which forms part of the district of Monte-Carlo, finished construction in 2024.

Land has also been added to areas of La Condamine, primarily around the main harbor, and Larvotto/Bas Moulins.

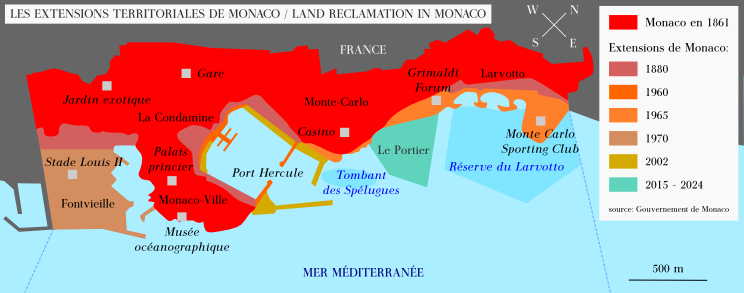
Land reclamation in Monaco since 1880

== History ==
Prince Albert's father, Rainier III, was known as the "Builder Prince". In an attempt to further develop the economy of Monaco, he first supported the idea of land reclamation. Since it was impossible to extend into France, the only solution was to reclaim land from the sea. First, the Larvotto beach district was created in the early 1960s, then the Fontvieille industrial area, increasing the principality's surface area by approximately 20 percent. More recently, Port Hercules has been extended to welcome larger cruise ships on one side, and to provide land for a new Yacht Club on the other.

== Projects ==
=== Le Portier ===
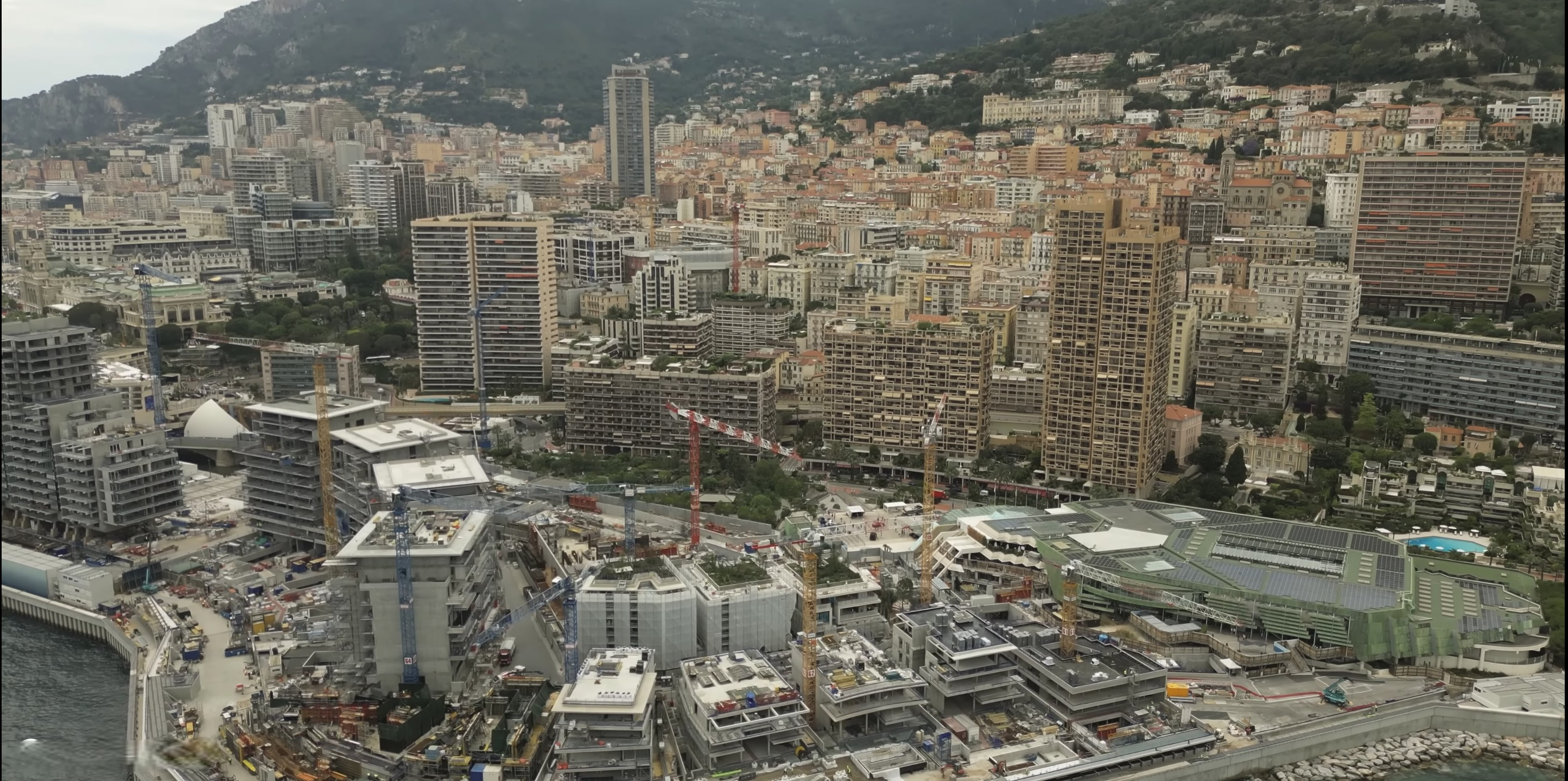
Le Portier, Monaco in July 2023

Le Portier, also known as Portier Cove, and Mareterra by its commercial name, was officially inaugurated for use on December 4, 2024. The project costed € 2 billion and is grounded on eighteen 26-meter high caissons weighing 10,000 ton each. The land reclamation itself was completed in 2020, while the land development was finalised in 2024.

Le Portier, or Mareterra, provides an essential expansion in Monaco's urban landscape, helping to alleviate pressure on their already overburdened housing market. This new area includes new residential buildings, dedicated public spaces, and a park. Designed as an eco-district Le Portier also includes a marine diversity program, energy efficiency directive, waste management systems, and stormwater management.

== Issues ==
There is a problem, however, for Monaco's future plans of expansion. Monaco's coastline on the Mediterranean is already a fragile and vulnerable environment. Any further land reclamation projects threaten to disturb or damage the coastal ecosystem. Due to the fragility and importance of the coastal marine environment, Monaco's Prince Rainier III created the Larvotto Marine Protected Area in 1976. This area extends 600 meters from the shore to the sea, covering 33.6 hectares, and protects the vital Neptune Grass population. Another area impeding reclamation efforts is the Spélugues coral reef marine area, established in 1986.With this in mind, Monaco's leaders have approached the prospect of further land reclamation with caution and have stated that new projects would have to meet strict environmental standards to limit damage to flora and wildlife. Due to the concerns that land reclamation could potentially damage local marine ecosystems, Prince Albert II has insisted the entire expansion be placed on stilts, like an oil rig, in order to disturb the sea floor as little as possible.

== See also ==
- Land reclamation in Hong Kong
- Land reclamation in the United Arab Emirates
- Land reclamation in Bahrain
- Land reclamation in Singapore
- Land reclamation in the Netherlands
- Land reclamation in China
