= Land reclamation in the United Arab Emirates =

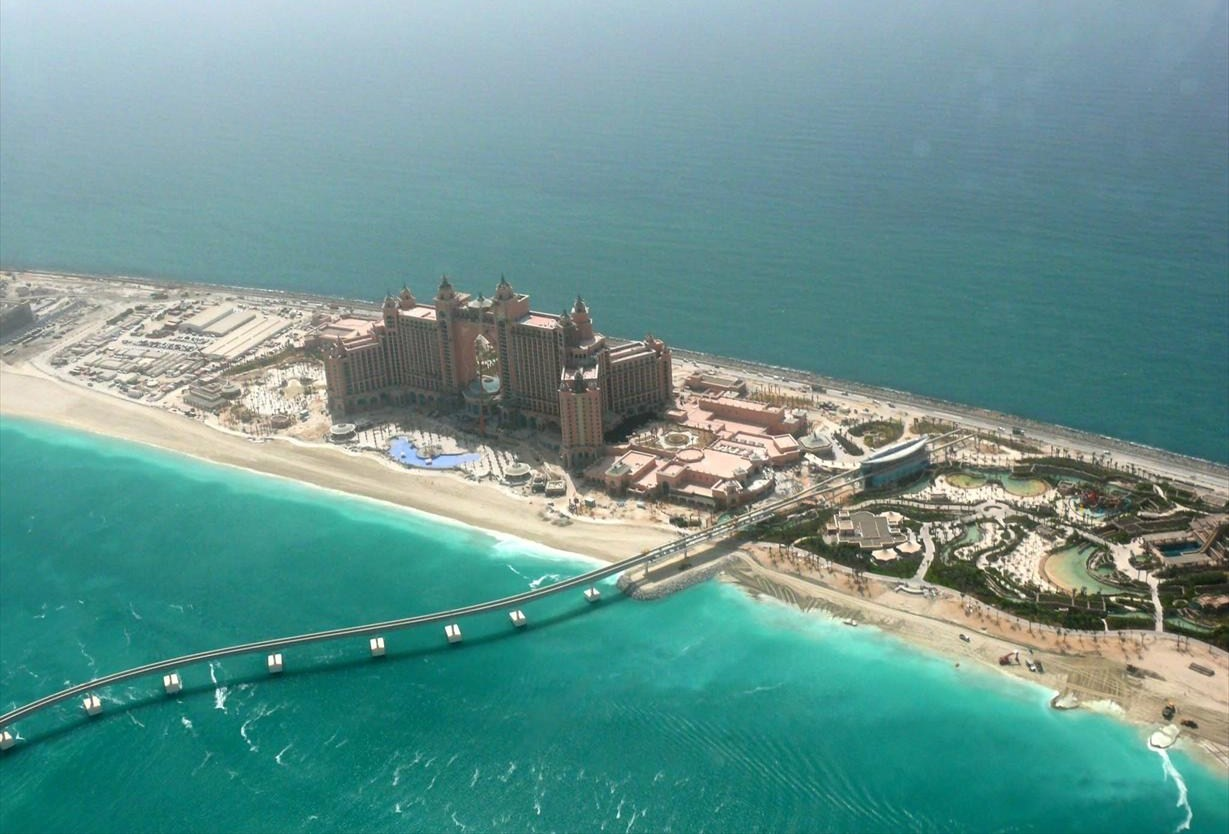
Palm Jumeirah Monorail and Atlantis the Palm Hotel, Dubai in May 2008

Major land reclamation in the United Arab Emirates, though a relatively recent phenomenon, has significantly changed the geography of some parts of the country. Multiple land reclamation projects, whether completed, under construction, or planned, have changed the appearance of Dubai, Abu Dhabi, and other emirates.

== History ==
Abu Dhabi

One reclamation method used in Abu Dhabi is filling in low-lying coastal flats. Several industrial areas have been built in these areas. Yas Island, Al Reem Island, and Al Lulu Island are a few examples.

Ajman

There have been proposals to reclaim land from the sea in Ajman. However, many have been rejected due to environmental concerns.

Dubai

It was created to boost the tourism industry, creating a complex society and a great place for tourists to rest (Happy 2001). Land reclamation in the emirate of Dubai has made it one of the most recognizable areas in the world. Dubai is perhaps most well known for land reclamation projects such as the Palm Islands, the World Islands, the Dubai Marina, and the Burj Al Arab. Most major land reclamation projects in Dubai have occurred in the past fifteen years, and the Burj Al Arab hotel, which is built on a man-made island, was started in 1994 and completed in 1999.

Ras Al Khaimah

The emirate of Ras Al Khaimah has also joined the race to build new land reclamation projects. Such projects include Al Marjan Island and its Real Madrid Resort Island.

== Geography ==
The Palm Islands are located off the coast of the United Arab Emirates in the Persian Gulf and will add 520 kilometers of non-public beaches to the city of Dubai.

== Projects ==
The Burj Al Arab hotel, Dubai in December 2007

- The World Islands
- Burj Al Arab
- Palm Jumeirah
- Palm Jebel Ali
- Palm Deira
- Al Marjan Island
- Yas Island
- Al Reem Island
- The Universe Islands
- Port Rashid

== Issues ==
There have been numerous environmental and economic concerns regarding the various land reclamation projects in the UAE. For example, extraction of rock and sand harms local environments and wildlife such as birds.

== See also ==
- Geography of Dubai
- Palm islands
- The World Islands
- Developments in Dubai
- Land reclamation
- Land reclamation in Hong Kong
- Land reclamation in Monaco
- Land reclamation in the Netherlands
- Land reclamation in Bahrain
- Land reclamation in Singapore
