= Prince Khalifa Bin Salman Island =

Artificial island in Bahrain

- Location within Bahrain

Geography
- Location: Persian Gulf
- Coordinates: 26.225°N 50.635°E
- Archipelago: Bahrain
- Adjacent to: Arabian Sea
- Total islands: 1
- Major islands: Prince Khalifa Bin Salman Island
- Area: 0.4 km^{2} (0.15 sq mi)
- Length: 1.2 km (0.75 mi)
- Width: 0.5 km (0.31 mi)
- Coastline: 3.9 km (2.42 mi)

Administration
- Bahrain
- Governorate: Muharraq Governorate

Demographics
- Demonym: Bahraini
- Population: 0 (2010)

Additional information
- Time zone: AST (UTC+3)
- ISO code: BH-15

Prince Khalifa Bin Salman Island is an artificial island in the archipelago of Bahrain. It forms part of the Prince Khalifa Bin Salman Causeway that connects the nation's capital Manama on the Bahrain Island to Hidd in the Muharraq island. It is named after Prince Khalifa Bin Salman Al Khalifa, who served as the Prime Minister of Bahrain from 1970 to 2020. The island hosts the Prince Khalifa Bin Salman Park, a 79,000 m^{2} (850,000 sq ft) urban green space that was constructed by the Nass Group. The park is used for public recreation and tourism activities.

== See also ==
- List of islands of Bahrain
