= Rainbowing =

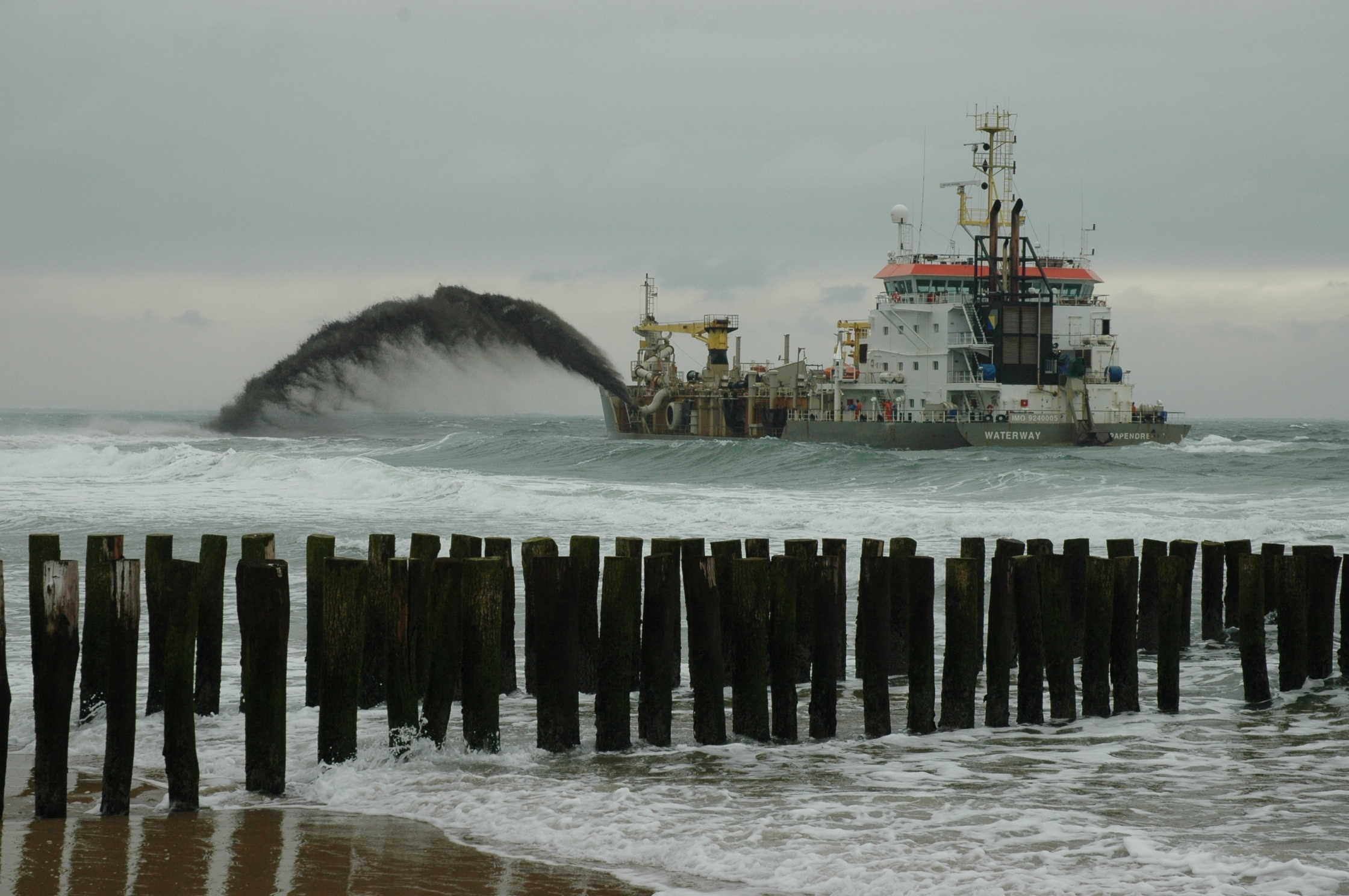
Rainbowing by the Waterway

Rainbowing is the process in which a dredging ship propels sand that has been claimed from the ocean floor in a high arc to a particular location. This is used for multiple purposes, ranging from building up a beach to prevent erosion to constructing new islands. The name is derived from the appearance of the arc, which closely resembles a brown-colored rainbow.

This technique was used extensively in the construction of the Palm Islands and The World, Dubai.

== Process ==
The process of rainbowing begins with the excavation of sediment, typically sand, from the seabed by a dredger. Dredgers excavate the sediment using mechanical or hydraulic methods or a combination of both. During the excavation process, large quantities of water are collected along with sediment creating a mixture called slurry. The slurry can then be utilised on-site or transported to where it will be deposited. The liquid characteristics of the slurry allow the dredger to transfer the slurry by ejecting it through the air in arcs.

== Rainbowing nozzles ==
The projection of slurry for beach nourishment and other dredging uses is achieved through the use of nozzles which affect the output and trajectory of the slurry.

The diameter of the nozzle affects the output of the dredger and the distance that the slurry is projected. Smaller diameters, for instance, have less flow leading to lower hourly output, but are able to project the slurry over a further distance due to a higher exit velocity. Jumbo dredgers today can easily achieve distances in excess of 150 metres, but at the cost of 30% extra discharge time.

Nozzles that are angled 30° from the horizontal are standard. Although 45° nozzle angles achieve longer distances from a ballistics perspective, 45° nozzles have been observed to create large craters. In addition, a high amount of sand flows back towards the dredger. 30° nozzles instead project the sand with a flatter trajectory, minimizing back flow while achieving a final distance comparable to that reached by a 45° nozzle.

Other methods of disposing and transferring the slurry include pumping the slurry through pipelines or using natural forces such as wave currents.

== Advantages ==
Since rainbowing transfers material by ejecting it through the air, the technique is useful for reclaiming areas that are too shallow for direct placement. In addition, rainbowing allows the dredger to dispose excavated sediment on-site. This is useful for dredging operations such as creating trenches since the dredger can simply cast the excavated sediment to the side as opposed to spending time dumping or transporting the collected sediment. This allows for a continuous trenching operation.

== Environmental impact ==
Rainbowing, along with other dredging and reclamation methods, has various effects on the environment apart from vastly changing its geographical structure.

Throughout the dredging and nourishment process, plumes of fine sediment, which can take longer to settle, can remain suspended in the water for long periods of time. These clouds of fine sediment can have adverse effects on the ecosystem, asphyxiating fish and other fauna as well as blocking sunlight. As organisms die, the water becomes toxic as decomposed organic materials raise hydrogen sulfide levels. In such cases, it is often impossible for an ecosystem to revive. It often takes a couple years for the ecosystem to recover, when recovery does occur. In addition, coral can be removed or become buried by the sediment.
