= Gracefield Island =

New cosmopolitan Island community in Lagos State, Nigeria

Gracefield Island(The Phoenix)
- City
- 3D Aerial View of the Gracefield Island

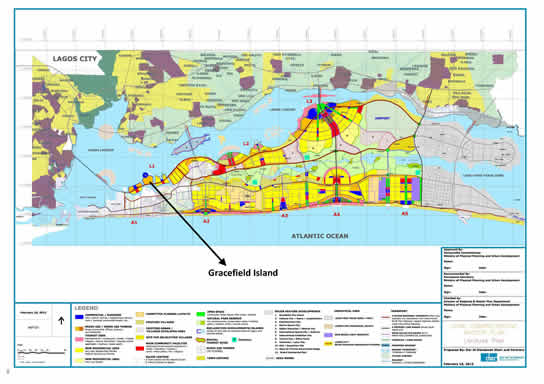
- Gracefield Island shown within the Lekki Masterplan

- Gracefield Island on map of Nigeria
- Coordinates: 6.477180647020161°N 3.5227003141257334°E
- Country: Nigeria
- State: Lagos State

Government
  - City Planner: Gravitas Investments Limited
  - Chief Executive, Gravitas: Olufemi Babalola
- Time zone: UTC+1 (WAT (UTC+1))
- Area code: 010
- Website: gracefieldisland.com
- This project is currently under development

Gracefield Island, also called The Phoenix, is a 100 hectares (250 acres) city in Nigeria created via reclamation of land from the Lagos Lagoon. The city is a joint venture between Gravitas Investments Limited (the city developers) and the Lagos State Government.

== Overview ==
Gracefield Island is a city developed from the reclamation of 100 hectares from the Lagos Lagoon and is expected to accommodate 10,000 to 25,000 people. The project, a joint venture between Lagos State Government and Gravitas Investments Limited, is located at the end of Chevron Drive, Lagos, and is connected to Lekki by its own highway.

The Lagos State Government approved the development of Gracefield Island in 2016.

Some companies with presence on the Gracefield Island are: Lafarge, Aspin, 9Mobile, Chevron Staff Coop, Zutari of South Africa, Samsson Group of Dubai, and HealthCare Outpost. The founder and Chief Executive of Gracefield Island is Mr. Olufemi Babalola and Chairman is Dr. Nu'uman Barau Danbatta, OFR, with Architect Ferdinand Agu, OFR, Peter Stephenson OBE, Leke Ojulari and Adetokunbo Adeyemo as directors.

== Development Milestones ==
In 2016, it was reported that Van_Oord, a marine engineering company, was working on land reclamation aspect of the project had reclaimed around 30 hectares (74 acres) of land at a finished height of 1.8 metres (5 feet 11 inches). By 2017, the city developers unveiled its nearly completed site office buildings.

== Infrastructure ==
The island will be a green city with integrated public charging points for electric vehicles, dedicated cycle lanes, and pedestrian pavements to encourage cycling and walking as standard means of movement.

Companies with presence on the Gracefield Island include Lafarge, 9Mobile, and HealthCare Outpost. 9Mobile is the exclusive provider of Fibre telecommunications service on the island.
