= Reef Island, Bahrain =

Island in Bahrain

Reef Island
Nickname: Lulu Island
- Reef Island (centre) in 2025

- Location within Bahrain

Geography
- Location: Persian Gulf
- Coordinates: 26.24°N 50.565°E
- Archipelago: Bahrain
- Adjacent to: Persian Gulf
- Total islands: 1
- Major islands: Reef Island
- Area: 0.713 km^{2} (0.275 sq mi)
- Length: 1.3 km (0.81 mi)
- Width: 0.65 km (0.404 mi)
- Coastline: 3.5 km (2.17 mi)
- Highest elevation: 0 m (0 ft)

Administration
- Bahrain
- Governorate: Capital Governorate
- Largest settlement: Le Reef (pop. 3000)

Demographics
- Demonym: Bahraini
- Population: 3000 (2016)
- Pop. density: 4,300/km^{2} (11100/sq mi)
- Ethnic groups: Bahraini, non-Bahraini

Additional information
- Time zone: AST (UTC+3)
- ISO code: BH-13
- Official website: www.reef-island.com/main.asp

Reef Island (Arabic: جزيرة الريف) is an artificial island in the archipelago of Bahrain. It has a distance of 2 km (1.2 mi) north of downtown Manama, on Bahrain Island.

== History ==
In 2000, a plan was proposed by a group called Lulu Island Development to develop a housing project at Bahrain. in August 2004 Construction began on the island. The investors were Lulu Tourism Company (a subsidiary of Mouawad Group), and the Government of Bahrain, 50% each. Cost of the Project: $1.5 billion

== Description ==
Designed by Spowers and Pentago, the housing project comprises a five star hotel resort, waterfront apartments, yacht club, boutique retail, villas, a spa hotel, lagoon apartments, a thirty floors apartment tower, marine retail, theater/exhibition halls and a marina.

All buildings are developed in a landscaped garden setting unique to Bahrain. Access for yachts up to 110 meters in length is provided and a number of beaches enhance the relaxed lifestyle inherent in Reef Island.

== Demography ==
There are several housing projects on the island, the major one is Le-Reef. Another big ones are Marina reef and Venice reef.

== Administration ==
The island belongs to Capital Governorate.

== Transportation ==
There is a causeway connecting Reef Island with Manama on Bahrain Island.

== Image gallery ==
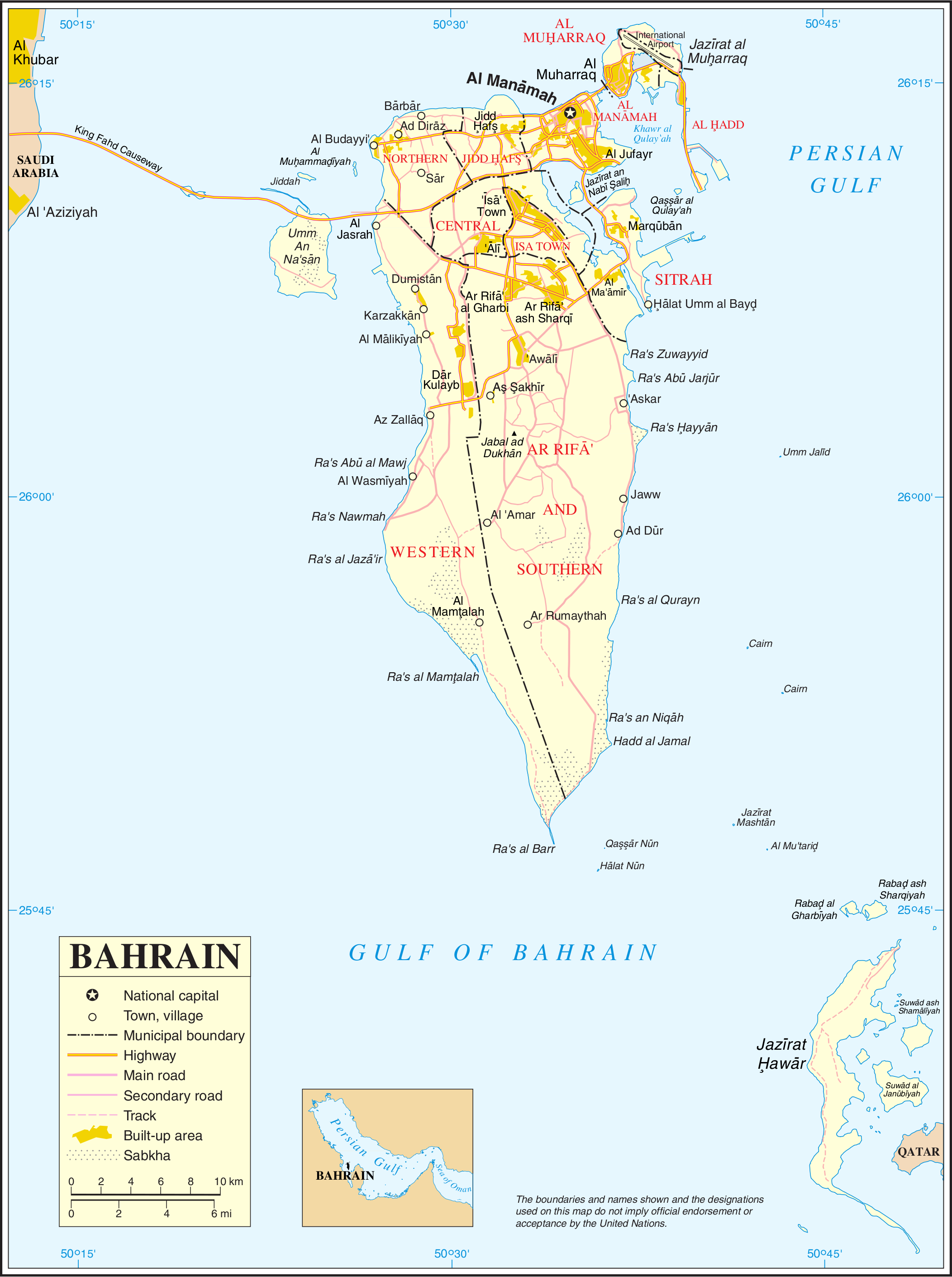
Map 1

District Map

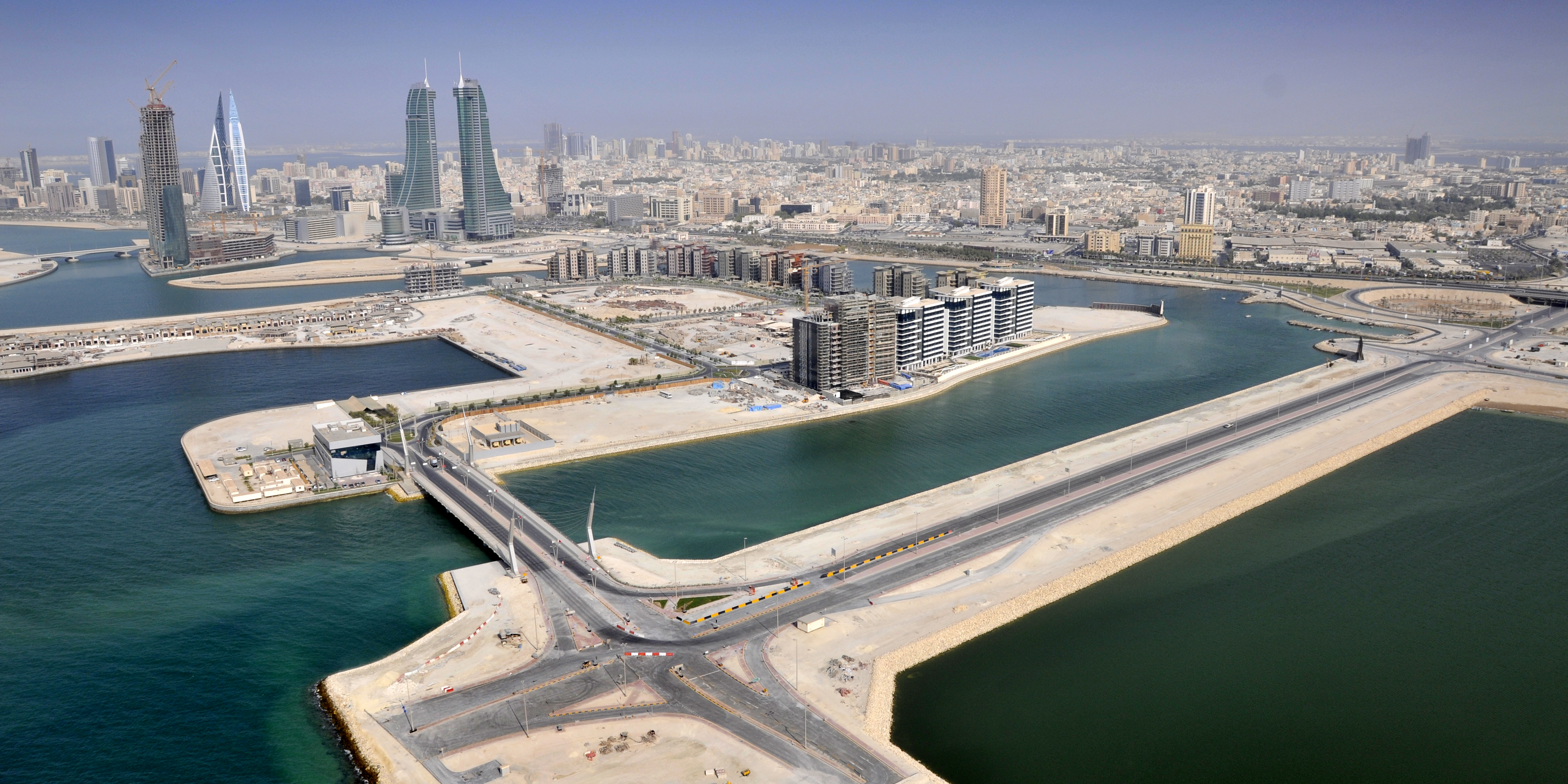
Image of Reef Island

== See also ==
- List of islands of Bahrain
