= Awadhiya =

Awadhiya فريج العوضية
- Neighborhood
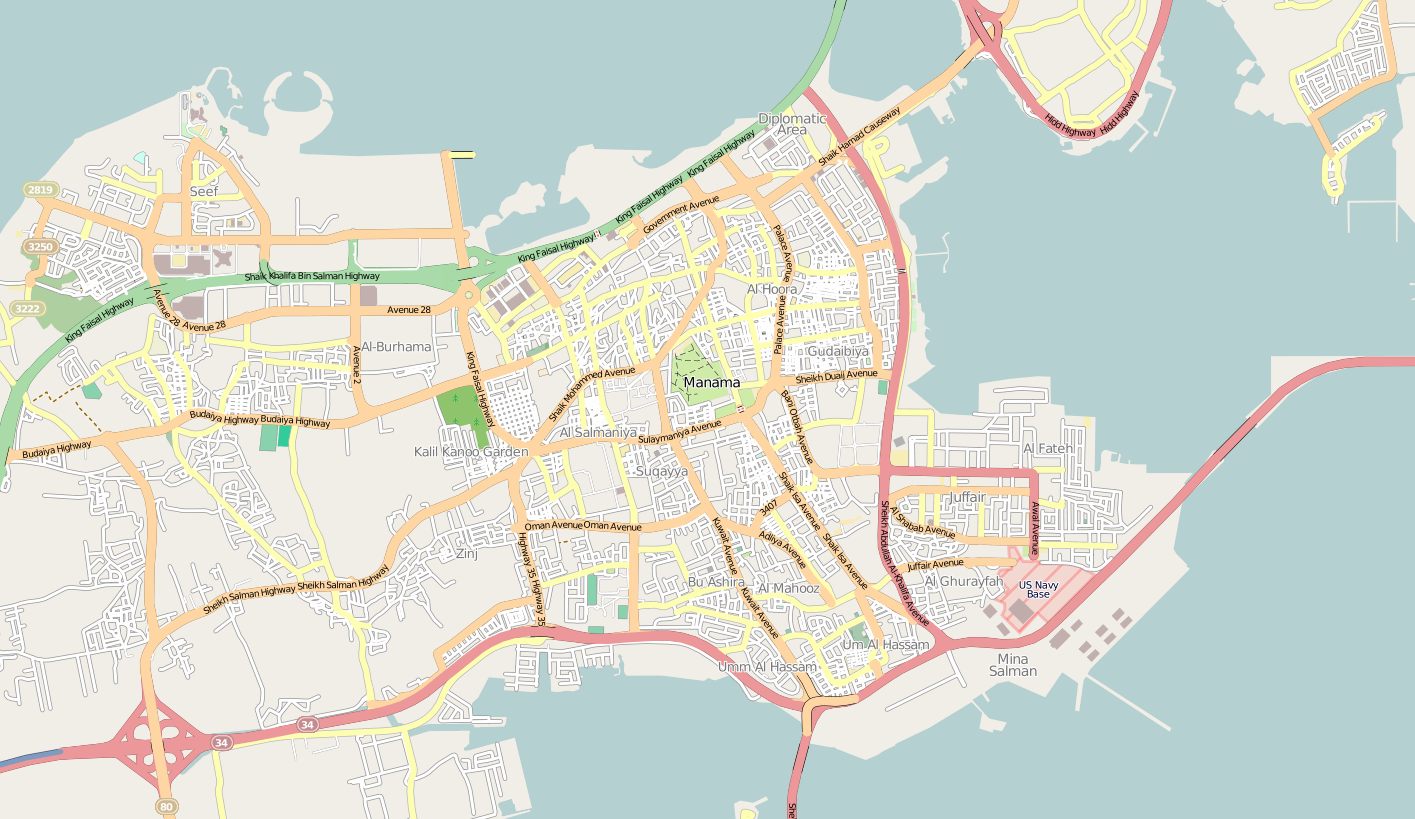
- Location in Manama Awadhiya (Bahrain)
- Coordinates: 26°13′57″N 50°35′8″E
- Country: Bahrain
- Governorate: Capital Governorate

Awadhiya (Arabic: فريج العوضية) is a new neighborhood of Manama, the capital city of Bahrain. It lies roughly between Ras Rumman and Hoora, while the Manama Souq lies to Awadhiya's west. The neighborhood was originally settled by merchants of Huwala origin, especially from Larestan and Bastak. Today the area is a busy commercial district. The neighborhood contains some of the last remaining houses built in the traditional architectural style featuring badgeer windtowers.

Map of Manama in 1926 showing the Awadhiya neighbourhood.
