= Fareej Mushbir =

Manaman district

Map of Manama in 1926.

Fareej Mushbir (Arabic: فريج مشبر) is an old district neighbouring the Manama Souq, in the city of Manama, Bahrain. The district was part of the original core of Old Manama, prior to its expansion in the 20th century.

It was established in the early 19th century by Iranians living in that country.

== Mushbir canal ==
The area is most famous for the Mushbir canal (also called the Manama Canal), part of a series of ancient canals lining the north of Bahrain, which was the most important source water supply in the capital. Predominately Shia neighbourhoods grew around the canal, local folklore suggests that it led to the formation of the current Mushbir district and the Hammam district, then an agricultural hamlet. It also led to the establishment of the two oldest religious institutions in Manama; the Jami' al Mu'min (first mentioned in 1738) and Matam bin Aman, where Ashura processions are organised.

It is also believed that, during the 1783 Bani Utbah invasion of Bahrain, the Mushbir canal was used by the Bani Utbah to capture the Persian-held Diwan Fort, then the administrative headquarters of Bahrain.

=== Disuse ===
The canal fell into disuse as did much of the country's old canal system during the 19th and 20th century. However, vegetation continued to grow around the canals. In 1904–1905, a wave of cholera and plague struck Bahrain, killing hundreds. It was thought that the canals harboured deadly microbes and it was transmitted in clothes people washed in the canals. Historian Mohammed Ali Al-Tajir described Manama at the time as "the land of Manama consists of marshes and swamps that pollute the air with increasing epidemics".

Al Wazir, a poet from Jidhafs village, described Mushbir in his poem:

Mushbir was created for God's sake... Only to remind people of the burning Hell Fire

— Al Wazir

== Notes ==
1Al Wazir's comment drew criticism from Manama intellectuals.
