= Alawi al-Hashimi =

Bahraini poet and academic (born 1948)

- علوي الهاشمي
- Born: Alawi Hashem Hussain Al-Hashemi; September 1948 (age 77); Manama, Bahrain
- Education: University of London, Beirut Arab University, Cairo University, Tunis University
- Occupations: poet, TV presenter, broadcaster, university professor, literary critic

Alawi al-Hashimi (Arabic: علوي الهاشمي, born September 1948) is a Bahraini poet and university professor. He was born and raised in the capital, Manamma, in a large Hasina family. He obtained a Diploma in Commerce from the University of London in 1968, a Bachelor of Arts in the Arabic language from Beirut Arab University in 1972, a Master of Arts in Arabic literature from Cairo University in 1978, and a PhD in Arabic literature from Tunis University in 1986. He has taught at the College of Arts of the University of Bahrain and served as culture editor for the Gulf News and the literary section of Bahrain Magazine. He has published collections of poetry and literary criticism, and his complete poetry was anthologized in 2012.

== Biography ==
Alawi bin Hashem bin Hussein bin Hashem Al-Hashemi was born in the Fareej el-Makharqa neighborhood of Manama in 1948 and grew up in a large Hasina family, descended from the Banu Hashim tribe. His father was a modest merchant, but his mother was a Hasina from the family of Syed Salman Al Sharaf; thus, he was given the name “Alawi,” since his Hasina relatives are said to have been descended from the imam Ali. He enrolled at the Eastern School (Al Sharqiyah) in 1954, then transferred to the Western School (Al Raja School) in 1956, from which he graduated with the tawjihi certificate in 1965. He continued his studies by earning a 1968 Diploma in Commerce from the University of London, a 1972 Bachelor of Arts. in Arabic from Beirut Arab University, a 1978 Master of Arts in Arabic literature from Cairo University, and a 1986 Ph.D. in Arabic literature from Tunis University.

He worked several short-lived business jobs, but became better-known for his work with the Bahrain Radio and Television Corporation as a translator, programmer, broadcaster, and coordinator of hadith readings. In 1978, he began teaching as an assistant professor at the College of Arts of the University of Bahrain. He entered journalism as editor of the culture section of Gulf News and Akhbar Al Khaleej as well as the literary section of Bahrain Magazine. He also has served as founding treasurer of the Bahrain Writers’ Association and as president it for several terms.

== Career ==
Al-Hashimi has appeared at many literary conferences and poetry festivals. He belongs to a generation of poets emerging in the early 1960s, who contributed to revitalizing, developing, and defining the modern Bahraini literary scene.

== Work ==
=== Poetry collections ===
- من أين يجي الحزن؟ (“Where Does Grief Come From”, 1972)
- العصافير وظل الشجرة (“Sparrows and Tree Shade”, 1978)
- محطّات للتعب (“Stations of Fatigue”, 1988)

=== Critical studies ===
- ما قالته النحلة للبحر (“What the Palm Told the Sea: A Study of Poetry in Bahrain”, 1981)
- شعراء البحرين المعاصرون (“Contemporary Bahrain Poets”, 1988)
- السكون المتحرك 1: بنية الإيقاع (“Moving Stillness 1: Rhythmic Structure”, 1992)
- السكون المتحرك 2: بنية اللغة (“Moving Stillness 2: Linguistic Structure”, 1993)
- السكون المتحرك 3: بنية المضمون (“Moving Stillness 3: Secured Structure”, 1995)
- ظاهرة التعالق النصي في الشعر السعودي الحديث (“The Phenomenon of Textual Correlation in Modern Saudi Poetry”, 1998)
- فلسفة الإيقاع في الشعر العربي (“The Philosophy of Rhythm in Arabic Poetry”, 2006)
