= Ahmed Behzad =

Bahraini politician

member of Consultative Council ((Majlis al-shura)
- In office 2006–2018

Personal details
- Born: Manama

Ahmed Ibrahim Mahmood Behzad (Arabic: أحمد إبراهيم محمود بهزاد) is a Bahraini politician who served on the Consultative Council (Majlis al-shura) from 2006 to 2018.

== Biography ==
Behzad was born in Manama, where he attended high school.

He went into the private sector, where he founded and chaired the board of directors of Elames Trading and Contracting Company (founded in 1973), Behzad Lighting Company, Behzad Trading Company (based in Dammam, Saudi Arabia); Elames Aluminum Company and Behzad Irinatech Electrical Contracting; regional offices for Kohler Co., Safety Systems, and Neptune Technology Company, and Bacon Construction; Shato Company out of Abu Dhabi; and the general Behzad Group holdings. In 2002, he won office in the sixth district of the Capital Governorate for the Council of Representatives with 1906 votes (86.99% of those cast in the seat). In 2006, he was appointed to the upper house, known as the Shura Council.
