= Al Asimah =

Al Asimah means "the capital" in Arabic. It may refer to:

- Al Asimah Governorate (Jordan), also known as Capital Governorate, or Amman Governorate
- Al Asimah Governorate (Kuwait), also known as Capital Governorate, or Al Kuwayt Governorate
- Al Asimah Governorate (Bahrain), also known as Capital Governorate, or Al Manamah Governorate
