= Jid Ali =

Jid Ali جد علي
- Town
- Location in Bahrain
- Coordinates: 26°10′45″N 50°33′44″E
- Country: Bahrain
- Governorate: Capital Governorate

Jid Ali is a prominent Bahraini geographical centre containing mixed residential and commercial properties located near the coast of Tubli Bay. Based south of the capital Manama in the Kingdom of Bahrain, it is located within the Capital Governorate. It is known for its various shops and for international and local cuisines as well as fast food.
