= Bu Ashira =

Coordinates: 26°12′N 50°35′E

- Neighborhood
- Interactive map of Bu Ashira
- Country: Bahrain
- Governorate: Capital Governorate

Bu Ashira is a neighborhood of Manama, Bahrain.

== Overview ==
It consists mostly of residential apartments and villas with a couple of high-rise hybrid apartments. It is also home to a large number of diplomatic missions of foreign countries such as:

- Embassy of the State of Palestine,
- Embassy of the People's Democratic Republic of Algeria,
- Embassy of the Syrian Arab Republic,
- Embassy of Yemen,
- Embassy of the Democratic Socialist Republic of Sri Lanka,
- Embassy of the Arab Republic Of Egypt,
- Embassy of the Republic of Turkey,
- Embassy of the Republic of the Philippines,
- Embassy of the Islamic Republic of Iran,
