= Mamdouh Abbas Al Saleh =

Bahraini politician (born 1973)

Mamdouh Abbas AlSaleh
- ممدوح الصالح
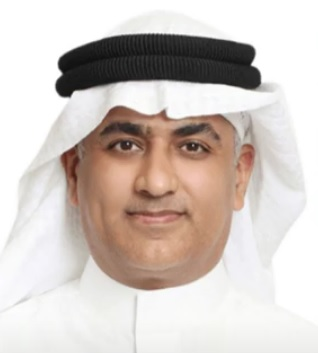

Member of the Council of Representatives (Bahrain)
- Incumbent
- Assumed office 2018
- Monarch: Hamad bin Isa Al Khalifa
- Prime Minister: Khalifa bin Salman Al Khalifa, Salman, Crown Prince of Bahrain
- Preceded by: Adel bin Amid Abdulhussein
- Parliamentary group: independent
- Constituency: Third District of the Capital Governorate

Personal details
- Born: Mamdouh Abbas Ahmed Al Saleh; 1973 (age 52–53) Manama American mission hospital, Bahrain
- Children: Nour, Ghadeer, Mariam, Adam, Noah
- Occupation: producer, businessman, art director

Mamdouh Abbas Ahmed Al Saleh (Arabic: ممدوح عباس أحمد الصالح, born in 1973 in Manama) is a Bahraini actor, assistant director, fashion designer, art director, and politician. He was sworn into the Council of Representatives on December 12, 2018, representing the Third District of the Capital Governorate.

== Career ==
Al Saleh founded the Scope Studio & Artistic Production, producing the political play أنا بكره إسرائيل (“I Hate Israel”) in 2006. He told Deutsche Presse-Agentur that he donated proceeds from the production to Hassan Nasrallah, Secretary-General of Lebanon’s Hezbollah. He then produced the television series وحوش وضحايا (“Monsters and Victims”) in 2008, the first of many works since.

== Council of Representatives ==
In the 2018 Bahraini general election, Alsaleh ran to represent the Third District in the Capital Governorate in the Council of Representatives, the nation's lower house of Parliament. He received 563 votes for 20.26% in the first round on November 24, necessitating a runoff on December 1, in which he defeated his opponent, Mahdi Sharar, with 906 votes for 52.19%.
