= Ghuraifa =

Ghuraifa الغريفة
- Village
- Location in Bahrain
- Coordinates: 26°12′21″N 50°36′05″E
- Country: Bahrain
- Governorate: Capital Governorate

Ghuraifa (Arabic: الغريفة) is a village in Bahrain that has now been subsumed into the Juffair suburb of Manama, Bahrain. Its Bahraini inhabitants are Baharna Shia.

The village and its descendants have produced a number of prominent Twelver clerics, including:

- Grand Ayatollah Allaedin Ghoraifi of Najaf
- Senior Bahraini cleric Abdullah al Ghuraifi
- Kamaleddin Ghuraifi, the assassinated representative of Ayatollah Sistani in Baghdad.

The village lies west of the United States Naval Support Activity Bahrain base, and south of the Bahrain School.
