= Abdul Hakim Al-Shammari =

Bahraini businessman and politician

Abdul Hakim Ibrahim Muhammad Al-Shammari (Arabic: عبد الحكيم إبراهيم محمد الشمري, born in 1965) is a Bahraini businessman and politician.

== Biography ==
Al-Shammari was born in Manama in 1965. He holds a Master of Business Administration, a diploma in political science from the Bahrain Institute for Political Development, a British qualified accountant, and a certificate in hotel management.

Al-Shammari went into the private sector, founding the Abdul Hakim Ibrahim Muhammad Al-Shammari Foundation and chairing the Board of Directors of the Al-Amal Commercial and Industrial Group and Al-Shammari Real Estate Group.

In the 2006 Bahraini general election, Al-Shammari lost a race for the Council of Representatives, specifically in the seventh constituency of the Capital Governorate. In that race, he won 1,414 votes (36.11%), 1,088 less than the winner, Abdul Aziz Abul, who was supported by Al-Wefaq and the National Democratic Action Society. In the 2011 Bahraini parliamentary by-elections, Al-Shammari won the seat with 1,121 votes (60.40%). Before the 2014 Bahraini general election, the Court of Cassation barred him from running in the fifth district of the Capital Governorate.
