= Ahmed Al-Bahar =

Bahraini politician

Ahmed Abdullatif al-Bahar (Arabic: أحمد عبد اللطيف البحر) is a Bahraini politician.

== Biography ==
Al-Bahar was born in the capital of Manama. He holds a Master of Science in Human Resource Development from the University of Sheffield and a diploma in education from the University of Leeds (both in the United Kingdom) and a diploma in advanced management from the University of Bahrain. He taught for the Ministry of Education from 1968 to 1978, then worked in Student Affairs for the University of Bahrain (then called the University College of Bahrain from 1978 to 1981. He worked in the human resources department at Arab Insurance Group from 1982 to 1992, then for the same department at the Ministry of Finance & National Economy from 1993 to 1995. He was appointed head of the Civil Service Bureau in 2005, and later royally named a member of the Consultative Council or Shura Council from 2009 to 2010.
