= Mubarak bin Rashid Al Khater =

- Born: Bahrain
- Occupations: Poet, Historian
- Known for: Contributions to Bahraini literature and history

Mubarak bin Rashid Jassim Al Khater (Arabic: الأستاذ مبارك بن راشد جاسم الخاطر, born in 1935 in Muharraq, died 2001) was a Bahraini historian, writer, and poet. He attended the Al-Hidaya Al-Khalifia Boys' School in Muharraq, then finished secondary school in Manama with a diploma in commerce. He worked after graduation at the Courts Administration, a division of the Ministry of Justice (1955-1967), the Ministry of Waqf (1967-1982), and the Ministry of Information (1982-1994). Retiring in 1994, he belonged to the National Council for Culture, Arts, and Literature, Sunni Waqf Council, Union of Arab Historians, the Al Eslah Society, the International Islamic Literature Association, and the Bahrain History and Antiquities Society.

Among the most influential historians of the region, he played a key role in documenting the early history of the Arab states of the Persian Gulf with a wide body of non-fiction and poetic work starting in the late 1960s.

== Books ==
1. نابغة البحرين عبد الله الزايد (“Bahrain’s Genius: Abdullah Al Zayed”), 1972
2. القاضي الرئيس قاسم بن مهزع (“Presiding Judge Qasim bin Mehza”), 1975
3. الكتابات الأولى الحديثة لمثقفي البحرين (“The First Modern Writings of Bahrain’s Intellectuals”), 1978
4. المنتدى الإسلامي (“Islamic Forum”), 1981
5. الأديب الكاتب ناصر الخيري (“The Writer, Nasser al-Khairy”), 1982
6. مسرحية العلاء بن الحضرمي لعبد الرحمن المعاودة (دراسة واستقراء) (“Abdulrahman Al Ma'awda’s Play Al-Ala al-Hadhrami [study and analysis]”)
7. المغمورون الثلاثة (“The Three Virtues”)
8. ابن مانع بين الخليج والجزيرة العربية (“Muhammad bin Abdul Aziz al-Mani Between the Gulf and the Arabian Peninsula”)
9. شعراء النهضة الحديثة في الخليج (“Poets of the Modern Gulf Renaissance”)
10. العلاقة الثقافية بين السعودية والبحرين خلال قرنين (“The Cultural Relationship between Saudi Arabia and Bahrain over Two Centuries”)
11. دخول البحرين في الإسلام (“The Islamization of Bahrain”)
12. ديوان عبد الله الزائد، (“The Diwan of Abdullah Al Zayed”), 1996
13. المؤسسات الثقافية الأولى في الكويت (“The First Cultural Institutions of Kuwait”), 1997
14. رجل ومولد قرن، مبارك سيف الناخي (المراسلات) (“A Man and the Birth of a Century: The Correspondence of Mubarak Sayf Nakhi”), 2000
15. مضبطة المشروع الأول للتعليم الحديث في البحرين (“The Legacy of the First Project of Modern Education in Bahrain”), 2000
16. بواكير العلاقة الثقافية والتعليمية بين بلاد الشام والخليج العربي،(1900 – 1950) (“Early Cultural and Educational Relationship Between the Levant and the Gulf: 1900—1950”)
17. مقدمة في تاريخ التعليم في البحرين (“An Introduction to the History of Education in Bahrain”)
18. مقدمة في تاريخ البلديات في البحرين، (1918 – 1984) (“An Introduction to the History of Municipalities in Bahrain: 1918—1984”)
19. مقدمة في تاريخ الصحة في البحرين، (1894-1984) (“An Introduction to the History of Medicine in Bahrain: 1894—1984”)
20. مفهوم العمل لدى سمو الشيخ زايد (“The Concept of Work according to His Highness Sheikh Zayed”)
21. مفهوم اصطلاحي جديد للتراث الأهلي (“A New Authentic Idea of Civic Tradition”)
22. كتاب من عدة أجزاء عن حركة الثقافة في الخليج في المنتصف الأول للقرن العشرين (“Cultural History of the Gulf in the Mid-20th Century”)
23. Other work

== Poetry ==
- أحاديث سمك (“Fishing Hadiths”, poetry collection, Cairo: Wahba, 1999)
- الصك (“The Instrument,” poetry collection, Cairo: Wahba, 2001)
- شيئًا من الإصغاء يا سادة (“Some Listening, Gentlemen,” manuscript)

== Conferences ==
He attended many literary and scientific conferences and festivals, including the following:

- International Islamic Youth Conference, Libya, 1974
- 1st Gulf Historical Studies Conference sponsored by Qatar University, Abu Dhabi, 1979)
- Biography of the Proper Conference, Doha, 1979
- 1st Author-Imam Conference, Medina
- 4th Gulf Studies Conference, 1981
- GCC Arab Poetry Festival, Riyadh, 1988

== Awards ==
He has received many awards, decorations, and certificates of appreciation, including the following:

- Arab Historian Medal, Union of Arab Historians, 1987
- State Appreciation Prize in Literature and Intellectual Work and National Order of Merit, 1992
