= Ahmed Al Khalifa =

Bahraini poet (1929–2004)

- أحمد آل خليفة
- Born: Ahmed bin Mohammed bin Khalifa bin Hamad Al Khalifa; 1929; Al Jasra, Bahrain
- Died: March 29, 2004 (aged 74–75); Manama, Bahrain
- Occupation: poet

Ahmed bin Mohammed bin Khalifa bin Hamad Al Khalifa (Arabic: أحمد بن محمد بن خليفة بن حمد آل خليفة; 1929 – March 29, 2004) was a Bahraini poet. Born in the village of Al Jasra, he held several government jobs in his youth, and then became a self-employed poet and writer. He represented his country at a number of literary conferences in several Arab capitals. As the author of several collections of poetry, he saw his first four collections printed as العناقيد الأربعة (“Four Collections”) in 1980.

== Biography ==
Al Khalifa was born in Al Jasra in 1929 to a branch of the House of Khalifa. His family moved to Zallaq when he was three, and he grew up until he moved to Manama for schooling in 1951. He attended Manama schools through high school, then took private tutoring in Arabic.

Occupying several government jobs in his youth, he soon devoted himself full-time to writing. He represented Bahrain in literary conferences in Riyadh, Tunis, and most notably the Cairo International Book Fair.

He died on March 29, 2004.

== Career ==
He started writing poetry from an early age, first publishing in the BBC’s Arabic Listener before being featured in a number of Gulf and other Arab magazines. Considered a leading patriotic poet, he is also well-known for his nabati (vernacular poetry). His work has been translated into English and German.

== Awards ==
He received the Order of Poetry in Muscat, Oman.

== Publications ==
- من أغاني البحرين (“Songs from Bahrain,” 1955)
- هجير وسراب (“Hajir and Sarab,” 1962)
- بقايا الغدران (“Dangerous Remains,” 1966)
- القمر والنخيل (“The Moon and the Palms,” 1980)
- العناقيد الأربعة (“Four Collections,” a compilation of his first four collections, 1980)
- غيوام في الصيف (“Summer Clouds,” 1988)
- ماذا قالت البحرين للكويت (“What Did Bahrain Say to Kuwait?,” 1991)
- عبير الوادي (“Scent of the Valley,” 2001)
