= Sadiq Al Shehabi =

Bahraini politician (1944–2017)

Sadiq Abdul Karim Al Shehabi (Arabic: صادق عبد الكريم الشهابي; 1944–2017) was a Bahraini politician. He was at one time the Minister of Health.

== Early life and education ==
Born in Manama, Al Shehabi earned a Bachelor of Arts in Social and Philosophical Studies from Alexandria University in Egypt in 1967, a Diploma in Medical Records from the Higher Institute for Advanced Studies in Egypt in 1975, a Diploma in Medical Records from the University of Bristol in the United Kingdom in 1976, and a Master of Health Administration from the University of Minnesota in 1984.

Al Shehabi taught at the Ministry of Education (Bahrain) from 1967 to 1969, then served as Director of Personnel Affairs at the Ministry of Health from 1974 to 1975, Administrative Assistant at the Salmaniya Medical Complex from 1976 to 1980, and the Complex’s Assistant Executive Director from 1980 to 1983. He then served as Director of Administrative and Financial Affairs at the Ministry of Labour and Social Development from 1983 to 1992, the Assistant Undersecretary for Social Affairs at the same Ministry from 1992 to 1999, then Assistant Undersecretary for Labor Affairs there from 1999 to 2004. He was appointed to the Consultative Council, the upper house of Parliament, in 2005 to succeed Hashim Al Bash upon the latter’s appointment as Minister of Foreign Affairs. In February 2012, he succeeded Fatima bint Mohammed Al Balooshi after she briefly held the portfolio along with being Minister of Social Development.

== Death ==
In September 2017, he died at the age of 73.

== Awards ==
- Sheikh Isa bin Salman Al Khalifa Medal, third class (2000)
- Certificate of Excellence from the World Bank (May 2001)
