= Manama =

Capital and largest city of Bahrain

Manama اَلْمَنَامَة
- Capital city
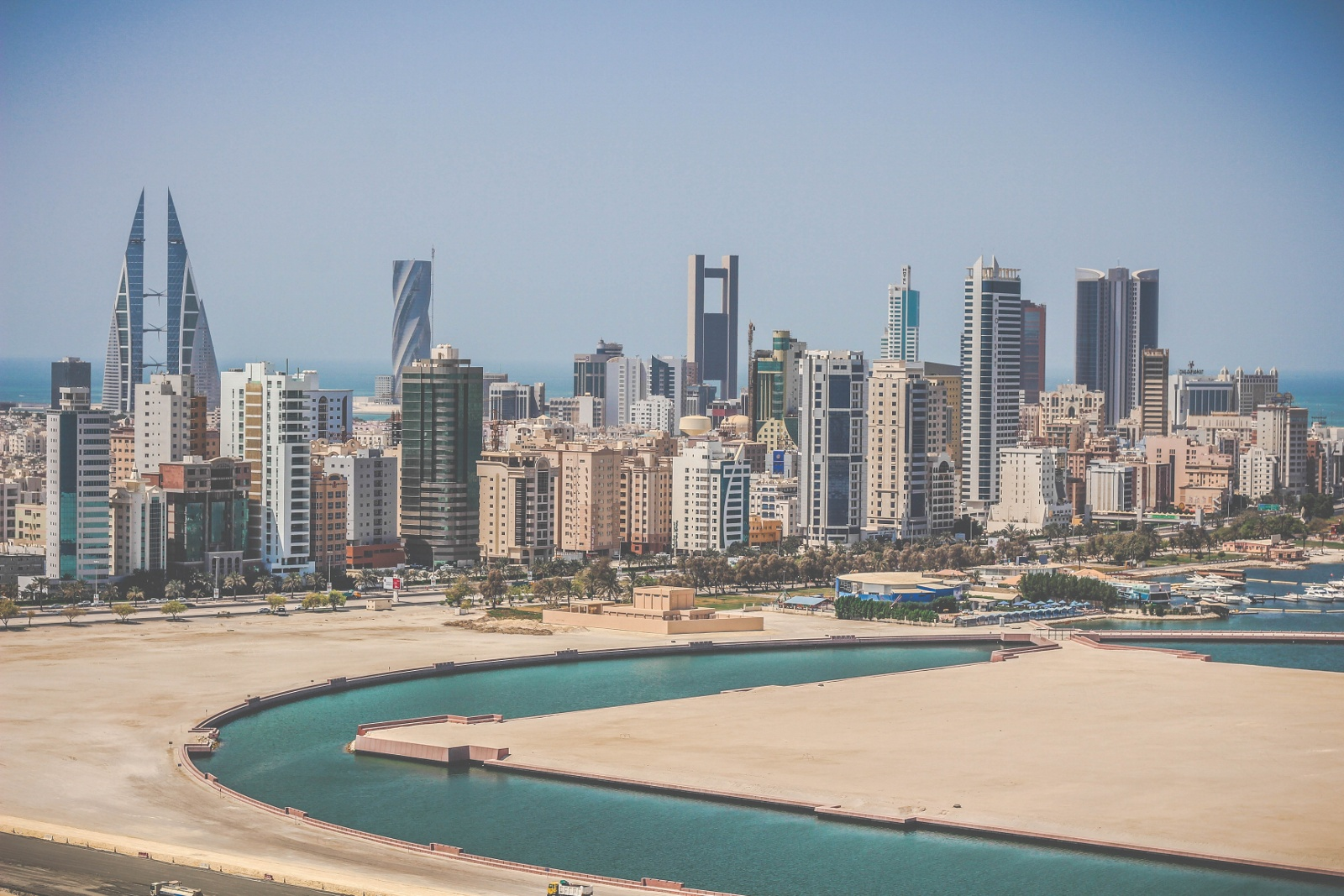
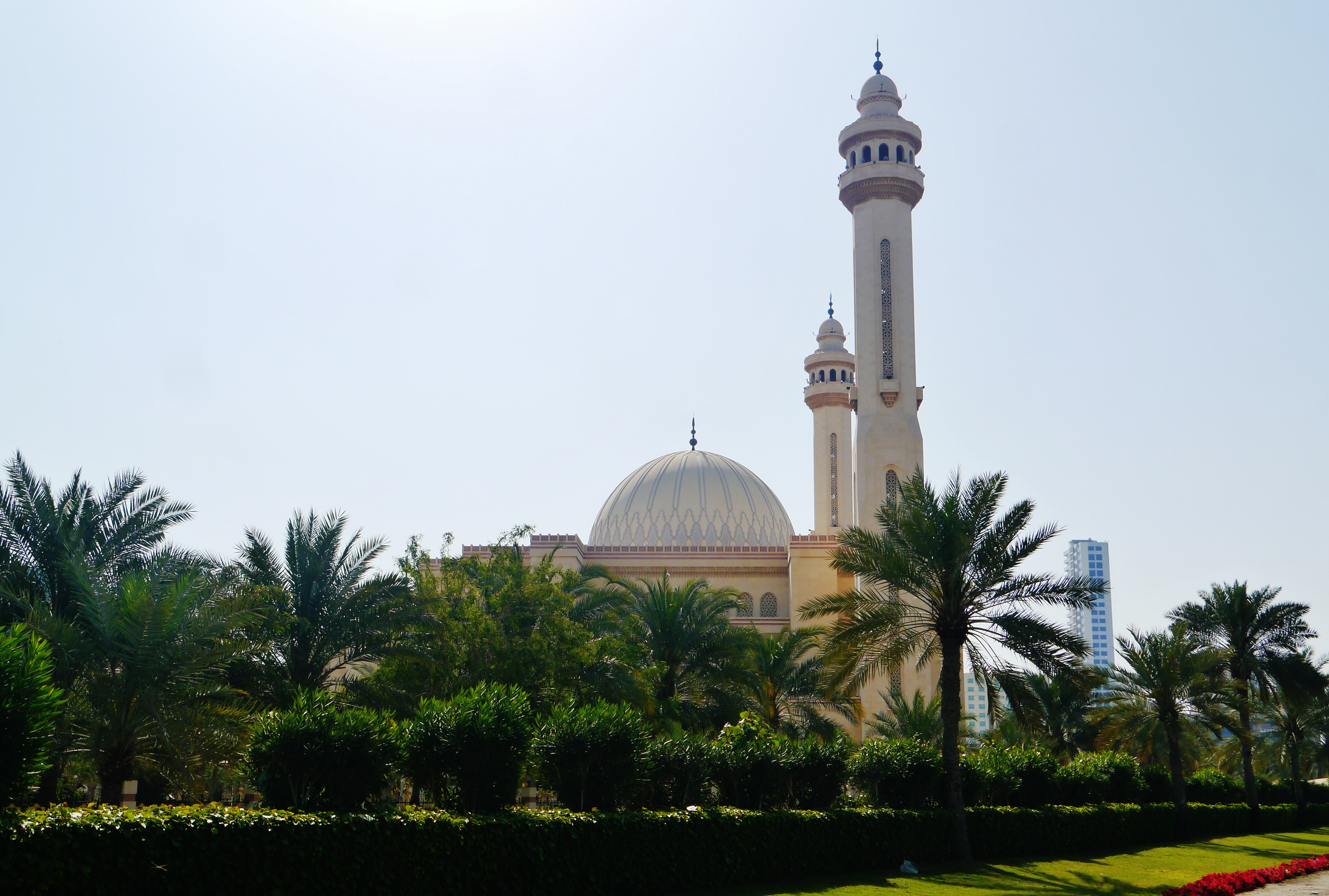
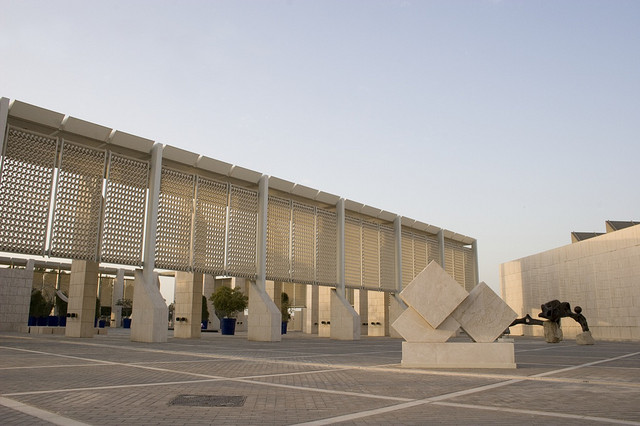
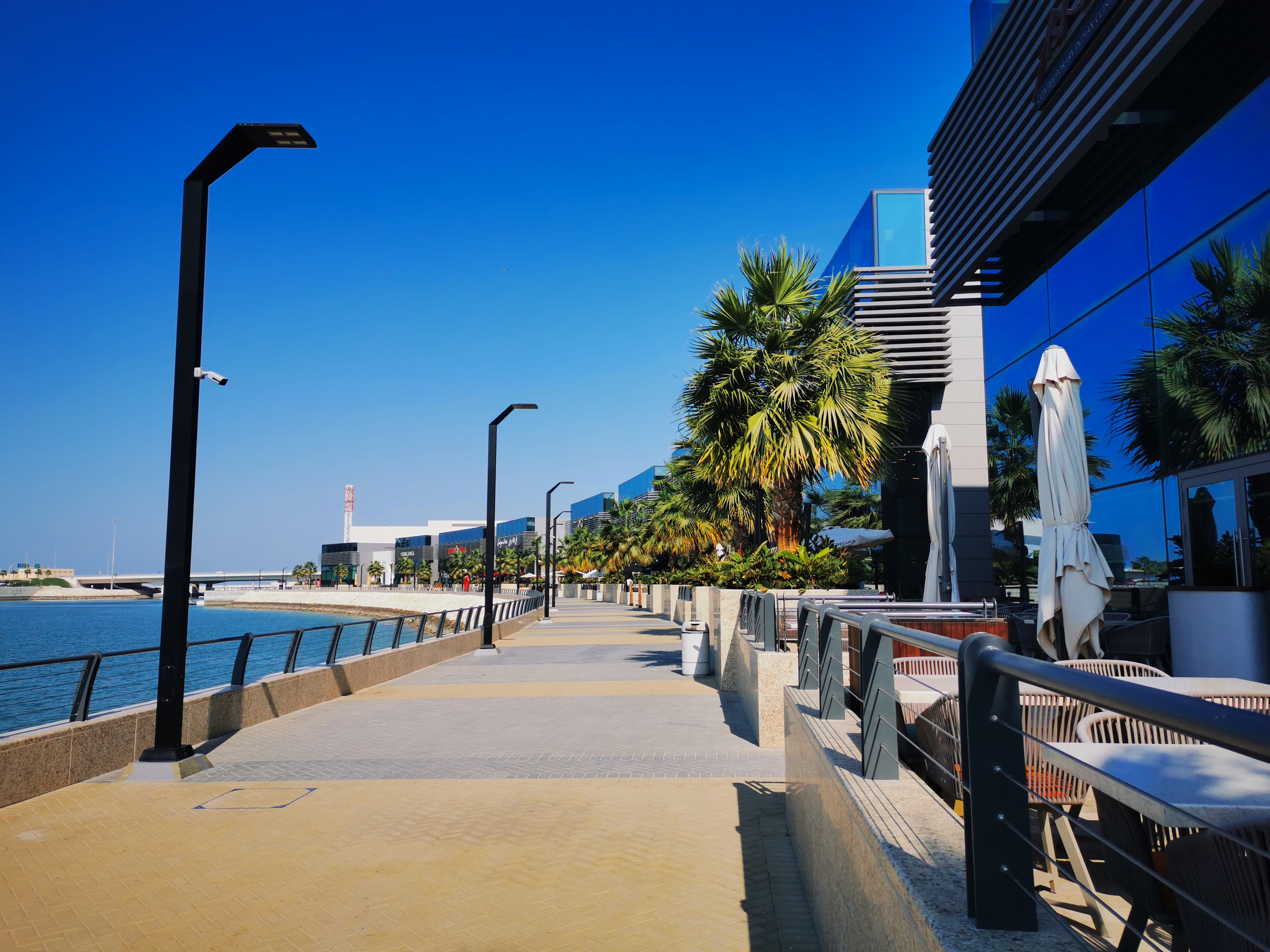
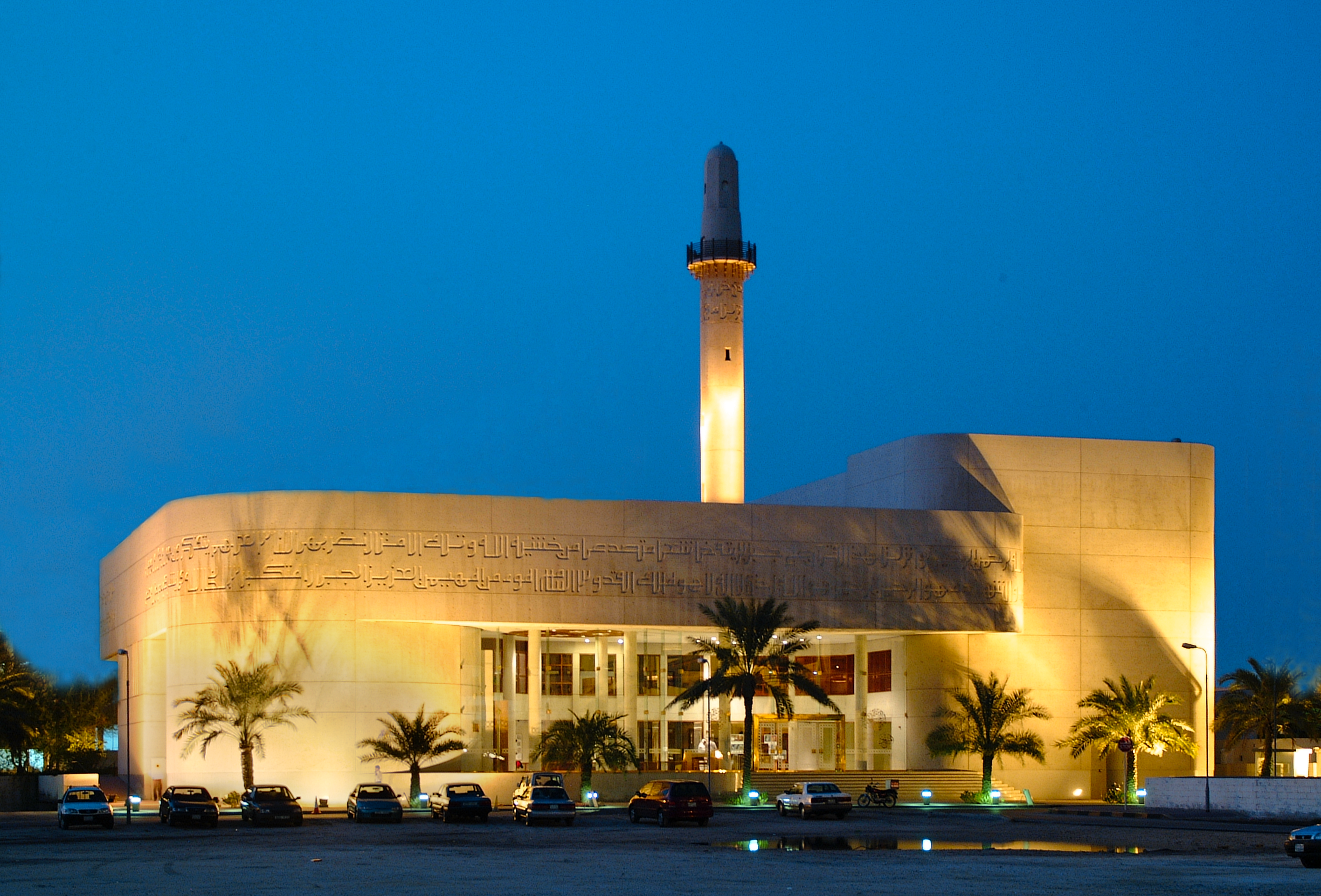
- Skyline of Manama Al Fateh Grand Mosque Bahrain National Museum The Avenues Beit Al Quran

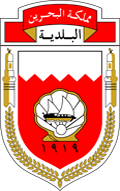
- Seal

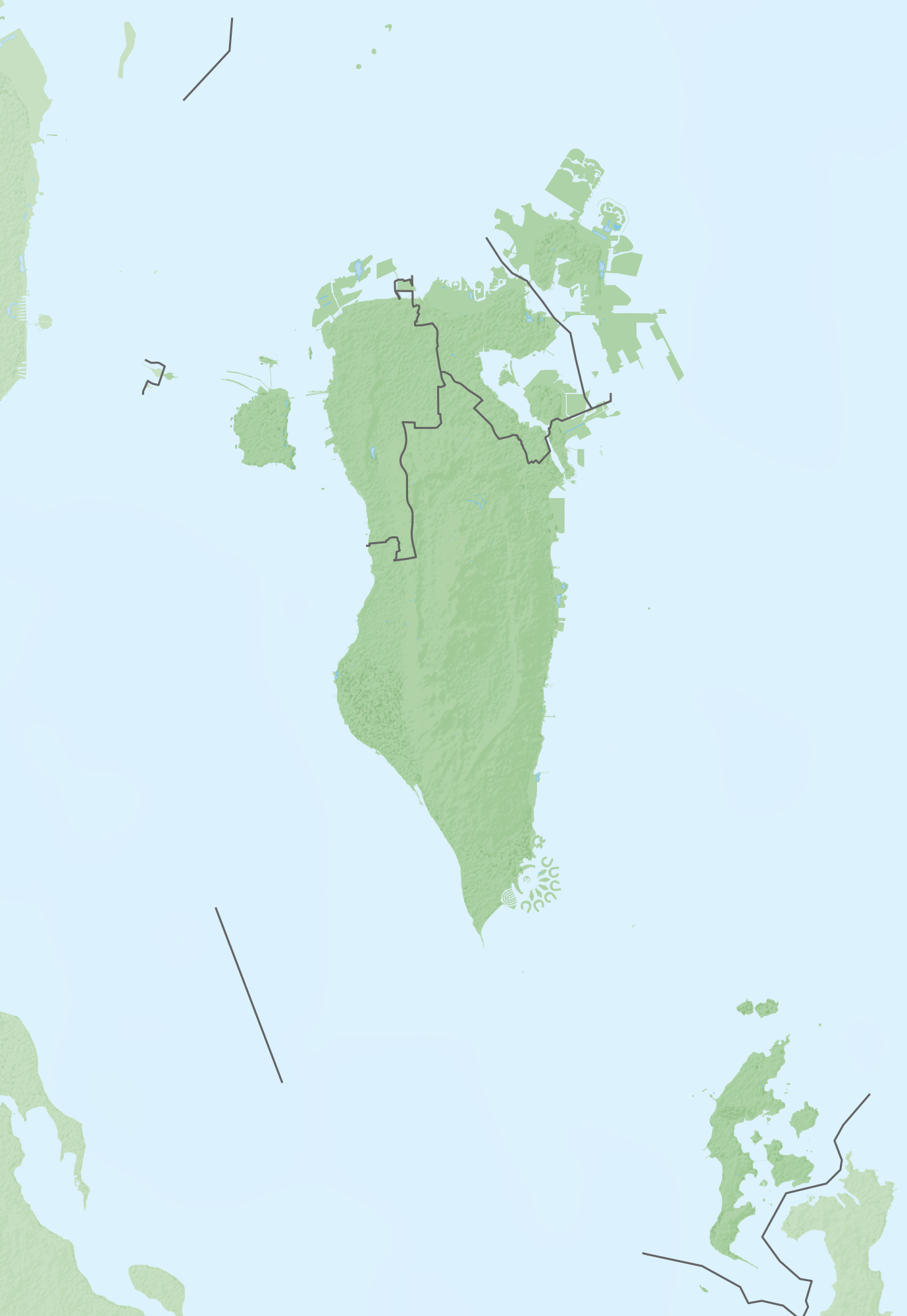
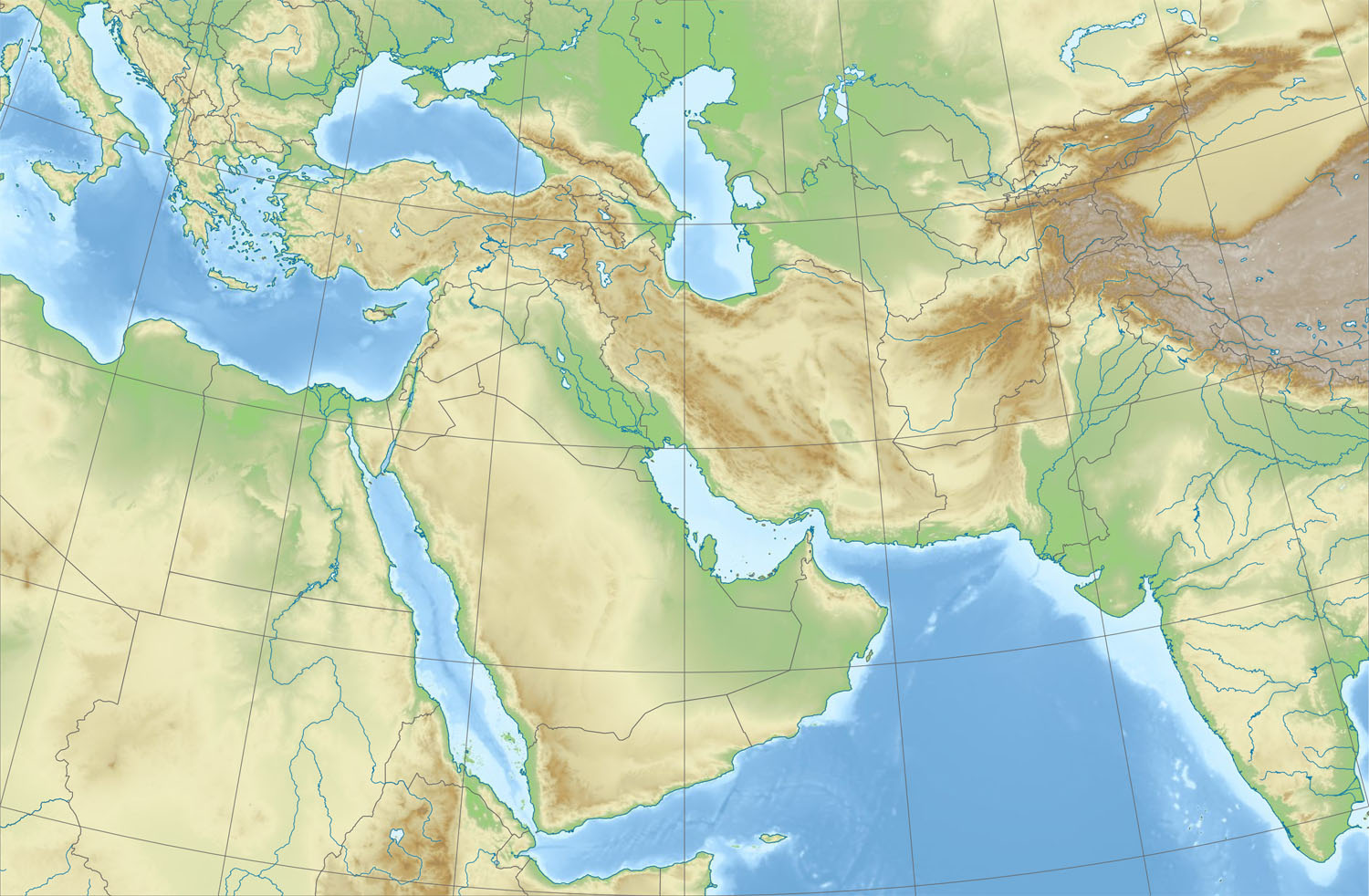
- Location within Bahrain Location within Persian Gulf Location within Middle East Location within Asia
- Coordinates: 26°13′24″N 50°35′15″E
- Country: Bahrain
- Governorate: Capital
- Founded: 1345 or earlier

Government
  - Governor (King): Hamad bin Isa Al Khalifa

Area
  - Capital city: 30 km^{2} (12 sq mi)

Population
  - Estimate (2025): 743,066
  - Rank: 1st
  - Density: 5,200/km^{2} (13,000/sq mi)
  - Urban: 727,000
- Time zone: UTC+03:00 (AST)
- Block number: 3XX–4XX
- Website: capital.gov.bh

Manama (Arabic: اَلْمَنَامَة, romanized: al-Manāma, Bahrani pronunciation: [elmɐˈnɑːmɐ]) is the capital and largest city of Bahrain, with an approximate population of 743,066 as of the 2025 estimate. Long an important trading center in the Persian Gulf, Manama is home to a diverse population. After periods of Portuguese and Persian control and a short invasion from the ruling dynasty of Saudi Arabia, followed by a longer invasion by Oman, Bahrain established itself as an independent nation in 1971 following a period of British hegemony.

Manama has a history spanning several centuries. First mentioned in Islamic texts as early as the 14th century, Manama remained a small trading port until it came under Portuguese control in the early 1500s. In 1602, the Safavid Persians expelled the Portuguese, and Manama became a regional center for commerce and pearling. By the late 19th century, it had grown significantly due to trade and was declared the capital of Bahrain in 1971 when the country gained independence from British protection. Since then, Manama has evolved into a modern financial hub in the Persian Gulf region.

Manama is situated on the northeastern coast of Bahrain Island, along the Persian Gulf. The city lies on low-lying terrain, with reclaimed land extending its coastline in recent decades due to rapid urban and economic development. Manama's coastal location has historically made it a vital port and trading point in the Gulf. The city has a desert climate, characterized by extremely hot summers, mild winters, and very low annual rainfall. Urban development has spread along the coast, with modern infrastructure, financial districts, and residential areas expanding into the desert outskirts and offshore artificial islands.

Although the current twin cities of Manama and Muharraq appear to have been founded simultaneously in the 1800s, Muharraq took prominence due to its defensive location and was thus the capital of Bahrain until 1923. Manama became the mercantile capital and was the gateway to the main Bahrain Island. In the 20th century, Bahrain's oil wealth helped spur fast growth and in the 1990s a concerted diversification effort led to expansion in other industries and helped transform Manama into an important financial hub in West Asia. Manama was designated as the 2012 capital of Arab culture by the Arab League, and a beta global city by the Globalization and World Cities Research Network in 2018.

== Etymology ==
The name "Manāmah" (without the Al-) was first recorded around the year 730 AH (approximately 1330 AD) during the visit of Turān Shah of Hurmuz to the island. At that time, it had already been annexed by his predecessor, Tahamtam II of Hurmuz.

The name is claimed by some to be derived from the Arabic word الْمَنَامَة (el-Menâme) meaning "the place of rest" or "the place of dreams".

Originally, it was called simply "Manamah" before being renamed to Al-Manamah. In Persian, "man" (من) means "me", and "nameh" (نامه) means "letter", similar to the structure of words like "Shah Nameh" (Book of Kings).

Bahrain's historical connection with Persian culture, particularly through the Sasanian and Achaemenid Empires, has influenced many place names and cultural elements in the region, supporting the possibility of Persian linguistic roots. Additionally, cities like Shah Khorah (شاه خورا) in Bahrain reflect this Persian influence.

== History ==
=== Pre-modern history ===
There is evidence of human settlement on the northern coastline of Bahrain dating back to the Bronze Age. The Dilmun civilisation inhabited the area in 3000 BC, serving as a key regional trading hub between Mesopotamia, Magan and the Indus Valley Civilisation. Approximately 100,000 Dilmun burial mounds were found across the north and central regions of the country, some originating 5,000 years ago. Despite the discovery of the mounds, there is no significant evidence to suggest heavy urbanisation took place during the Dilmun era. It is believed that the majority of the population lived in rural areas, numbering several thousand. Evidence of an ancient large rural population was confirmed by one of Alexander the Great's ship captains, during voyages in the Persian Gulf. A vast system of aqueducts in northern Bahrain helped facilitate ancient horticulture and agriculture.

"The capital of Awal... is a town well populated whose environs are fertile and produce corn and dates in abundance."

—Al-Idrisi

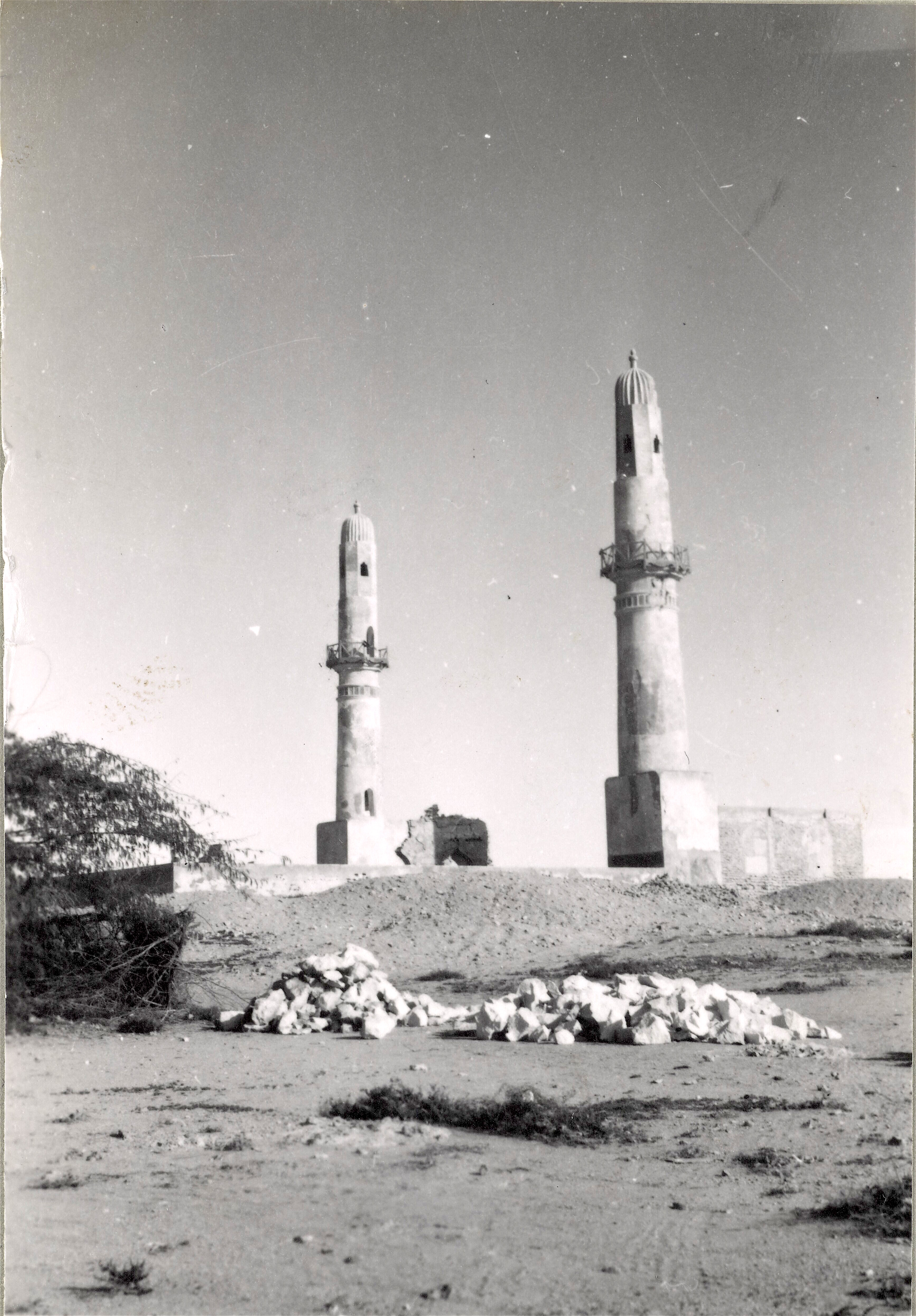
The Khamis Mosque in 1956

The commercial network of Dilmun lasted for almost 2,000 years, after which the Assyrians took control of the island in 700 BC for more than a century. This was followed by Babylonian and Achaemenid rule, which later gave way to Greek influence during the time of Alexander the Great's conquests. In the first century AD, the Roman writer Pliny the Elder wrote of Tylos, the Hellenic name of Bahrain in the classical era, and its pearls and cotton fields. The island came under the control of the Parthian and Sassanid empires respectively, by which time Nestorian Christianity started to spread in Bahrain. By 410–420 AD, a Nestorian bishopric and monastery was established in Al Dair, on the neighbouring island of Muharraq. Following the conversion of Bahrain to Islam in 628 AD, work on one of the earliest mosques in the region, the Khamis Mosque, began as early as the seventh century AD. During this time, Bahrain was engaged in long distance marine trading, evident from the discovery of Chinese coins dating between 600 and 1200 AD, in Manama.

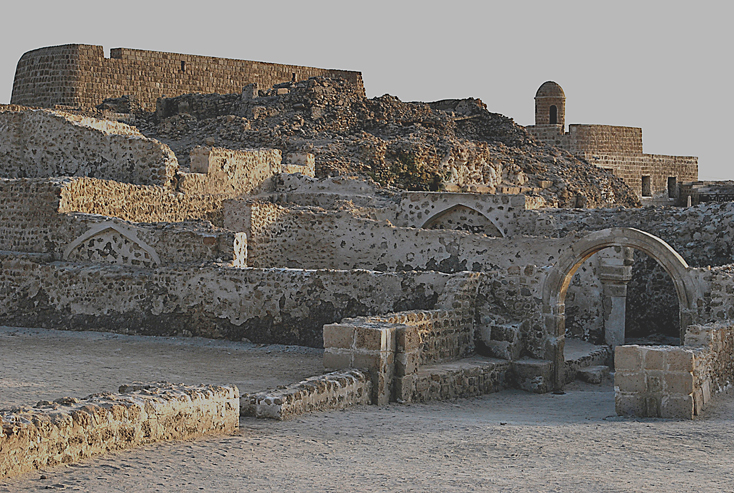
The Portuguese Fort, built by the Portuguese Empire while it ruled Bahrain from 1521 to 1602

In 1330, under the Jarwanid dynasty, the island became a tributary of the Kingdom of Hormuz. The town of Manama was mentioned by name for the first time in a manuscript dating to 1345 AD. Bahrain, particularly Manama and the nearby settlement of Bilad Al Qadeem, became a centre of Shia scholarship and training for the ulema, it would remain so for centuries. The ulema would help fund pearling expeditions and finance grain production in the rural areas surrounding the city. In 1521, Bahrain fell to the expanding Portuguese Empire in the Persian Gulf, having already defeated Hormuz. The Portuguese consolidated their hold on the island by constructing the Bahrain Fort, on the outskirts of Manama. After numerous revolts and an expanding Safavid empire in Persia, the Portuguese were expelled from Bahrain and the Safavids took control in 1602.

=== Early modern history ===
The Safavids, sidelining Manama, designated the nearby town of Bilad Al Qadeem as the provincial capital. The town was also the seat of the Persian governor and the Shaikh al-Islam of the islands. The position of Shaikh al-Islam lay under the jurisdiction of the central Safavid government and as such, candidates were carefully vetted by the Isfahan courts. During the Safavid era, the islands continued to be a centre for Twelver Shi'ism scholarship, producing clerics for use in mainland Persia. Additionally, the rich agricultural northern region of Bahrain continued to flourish due to an abundance of date palm farms and orchards. The Portuguese traveler Pedro Teixeira commented on the extensive cultivation of crops like barley and wheat. The opening of Persian markets to Bahraini exports, especially pearls, boosted the islands' export economy. The yearly income of exported Bahraini pearls was 600,000 ducats, collected by around 2,000 pearling dhows. Another factor that contributed to Bahrain's agricultural wealth was the migration of Shia cultivators from Ottoman-occupied Qatif and al-Hasa, fearing religious persecution, in 1537. Sometime after 1736, Nader Shah constructed a fort on the southern outskirts of Manama (likely the Diwan Fort).

Persian control over the Persian Gulf waned during the later half of the 18th century. At this time, Bahrain archipelago was a dependency of the emirate of Bushehr, itself a part of Persia. In 1783, the Bani Utbah tribal confederation invaded Bahrain and expelled the resident governor Nasr Al-Madhkur. As a result, the Al Khalifa family became the rulers of the country, and all political relations with Bushehr and Persia/Iran were terminated. Ahmed ibn Muhammad ibn Khalifa (later called Ahmed al-Fateh, lit. "Ahmed the conqueror") become the dynasty's first Hakim of Bahrain. Political instability in the 19th century had disastrous effects on Manama's economy; Invasions by the Omanis in 1800 and by the Wahhabis in 1810–11, in addition to a civil war in 1842 between Bahrain's co-rulers saw the town being a major battleground. The instability paralysed commercial trade in Manama; the town's port was closed, most merchants fled abroad to Kuwait and the Persian coast until hostilities ceased. The English scholar William Gifford Palgrave, on a visit to Manama in 1862, described the town as having a few ruined stone buildings, with a landscape dominated with the huts of poor fishermen and pearl-divers.

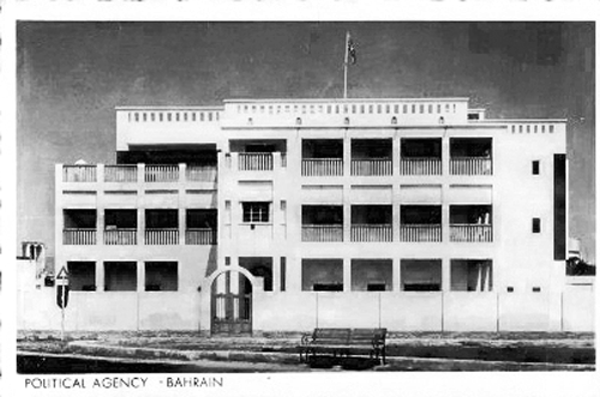
The British political agency, c. 1900

The Pax Britannica of the 19th century resulted in British consolidation of trade routes, particularly those close to the British Raj. In response to piracy in the Persian Gulf region, the British deployed warships and forced much of the Persian Gulf States at the time (including Bahrain) to sign the General Maritime Treaty of 1820, which prohibited piracy and slavery. In 1861, the Perpetual Truce of Peace and Friendship was signed between Britain and Bahrain, which placed the British in charge of defending Bahrain in exchange for British control over Bahraini foreign affairs. With the ascension of Isa ibn Ali Al Khalifa as the Hakim of Bahrain in 1869, Manama became the centre of British activity in the Persian Gulf, though its interests were initially strictly commercial. Trading recovered fully by 1873 and the country's earnings from pearl exports increased by sevenfold between 1873 and 1900. Representing the British were native agents, usually from minorities such as Persians or Huwala who regularly reported back to British India and the British political residency in Bushehr. The position of native agent was later replaced by a British political agent, following the construction of the British political residency (locally referred to in Arabic: بيت الدولة) in 1900, which further solidified Britain's position in Manama.

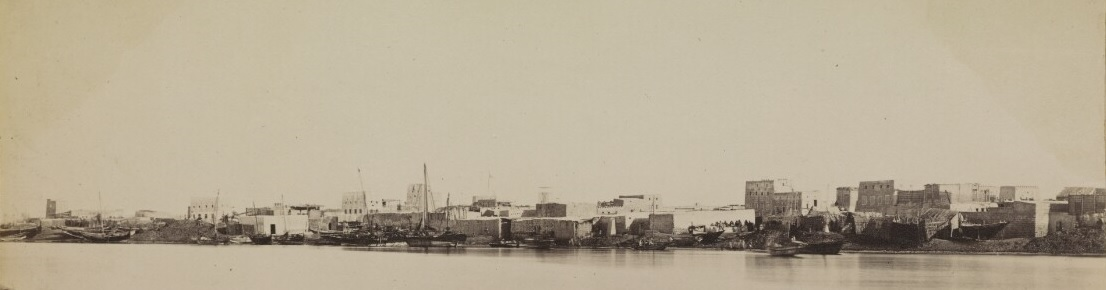
Manama harbour, c. 1870

=== Modern history ===
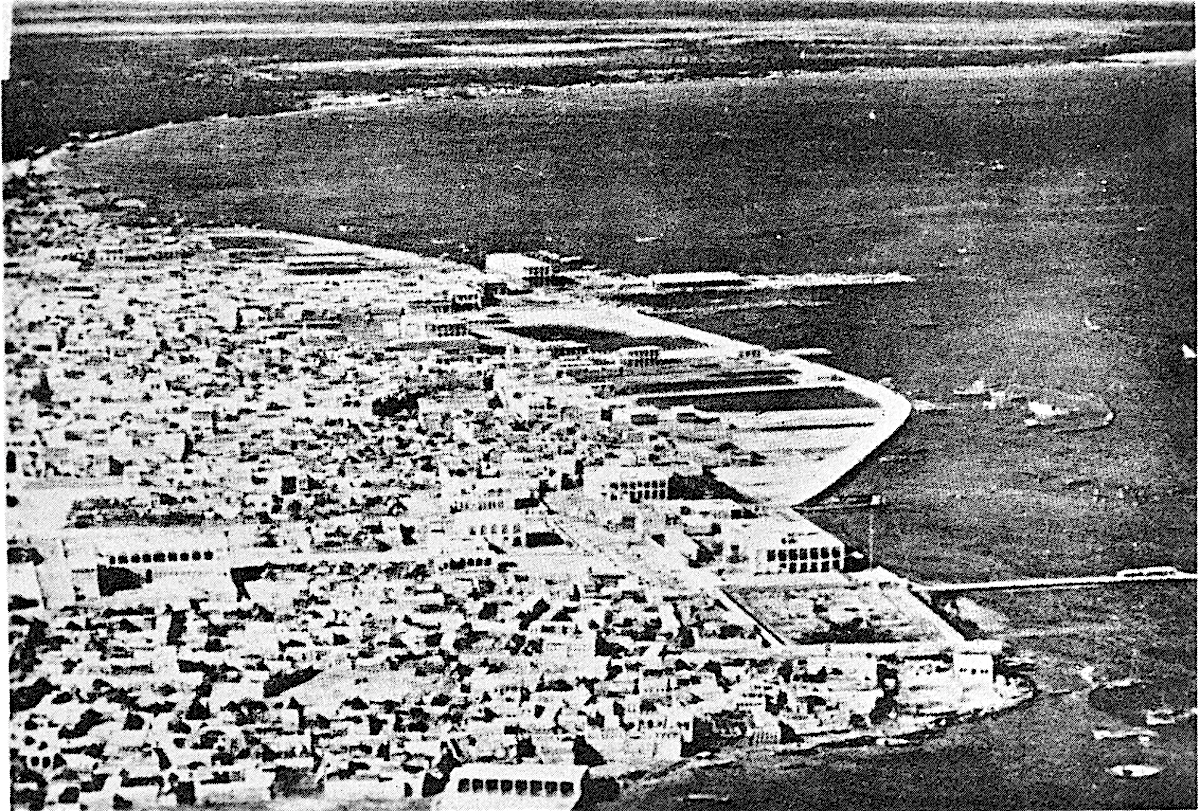
Aerial view of Manama in 1936

Following the outbreak of World War I in 1914, the British Raj used Manama as a military base of operations during the Mesopotamian campaign. Prompted by the presence of oil in the region, the British political agency in Bushire concluded an oil agreement with the Hakim to prohibit the exploration and exploitation of oil for a five-year period. In 1919, Bahrain was officially integrated into the British Empire as an overseas imperial territory following the Bahrain order-in-council decree, issued in 1913. The decree gave the resident political agent greater powers and placed Bahrain under the residency of Bushire and therefore under the governance of the British Raj. The British pressured a series of administrative reforms in Bahrain during the 1920s (a move met with opposition from tribal leaders), during which the aging Hakim Isa ibn Ali Al Khalifa was forced to abdicate in favour of his reform-minded son Hamad ibn Isa Al Khalifa. A municipal government was established in Manama in 1919, the Customs office was reorganised in 1923 and placed under the supervision of an English businessman, the pearling industry was later reformed in 1924. Earnings from the customs office would be kept in the newly created state treasury. Civil courts were established for the first time in 1923, followed by the establishment of the Department of Land Registration in 1924. Charles Belgrave, from the Colonial Office, was appointed in 1926 by the British to carry on further reforms and manage administration as a financial advisor to the King. He later organised the State Police and was in charge of the Finance and Land departments of the government.

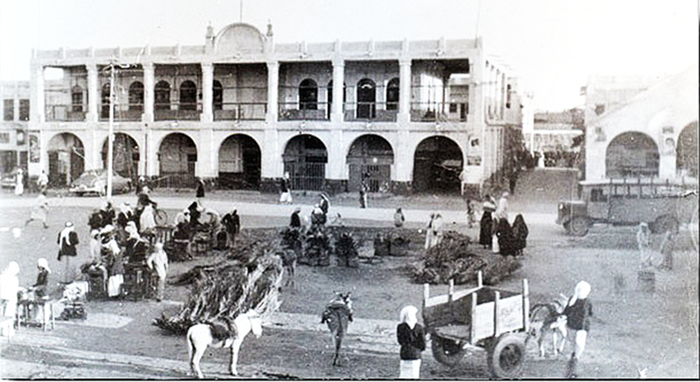
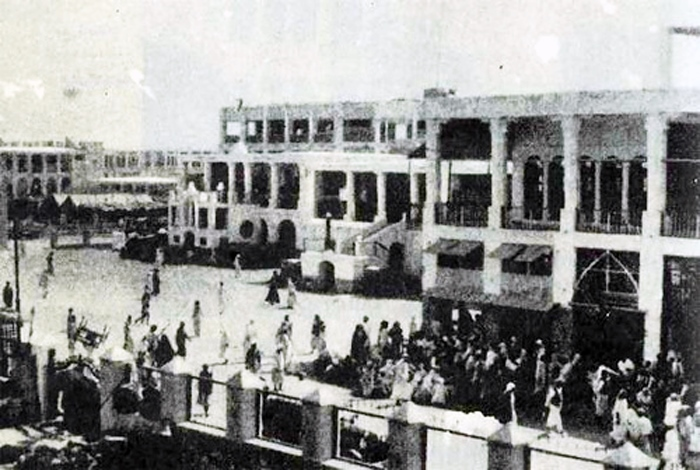
The newly formed Manama municipality (left) and the reorganised customs office of Manama (right)

In 1927, the country's pearling economy collapsed due to the introduction of Japanese cultured pearls in the world market. It is estimated that between 1929 and 1931, pearling entrepreneurs lost more than two-thirds of their income. Further aggravated by the Great Depression, many leading Bahraini businessmen, shopkeepers, and pearl-divers fell into debt. With the discovery of oil in 1932 and the subsequent production of oil exports in 1934, the country gained a greater significance in geopolitics. The security of oil supplies in the Middle East was a priority of the British, especially in the run-up to the Second World War. The discovery of oil led to gradual employment of bankrupt divers from the pearling industry in the 1930s, eventually causing the pearling industry to disappear. During the war, the country served as a strategic airbase between Britain and India as well as hosting RAF Muharraq and a naval base in Juffair. Bahrain was bombed by the Italian Air Force in 1940. In 1947, following the end of the war and subsequent Indian independence, the British residency of the Persian Gulf moved to Manama from Bushire.

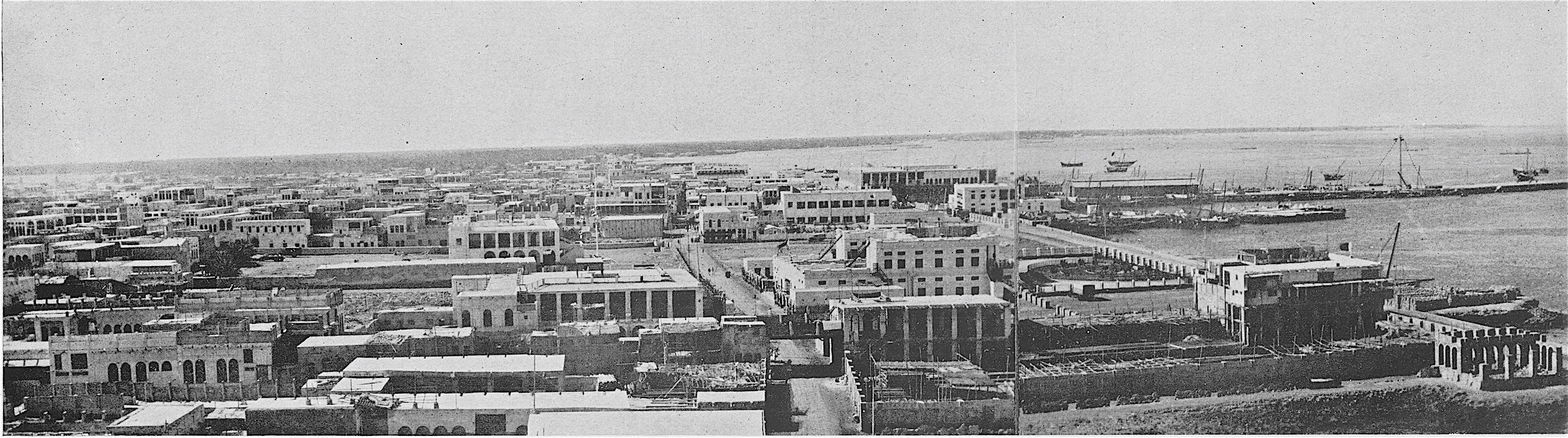
Manama in 1945

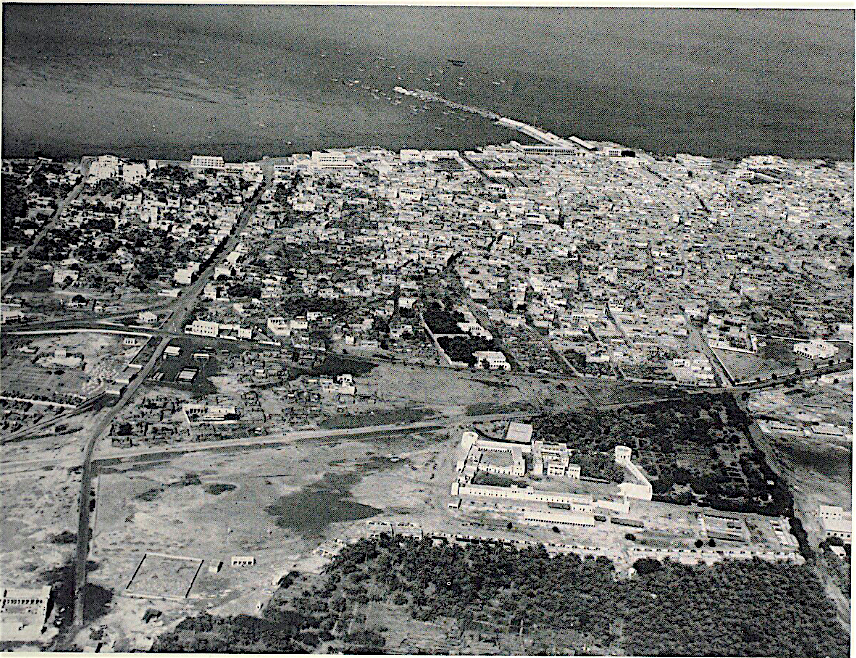
Aerial View of Manama, 1953

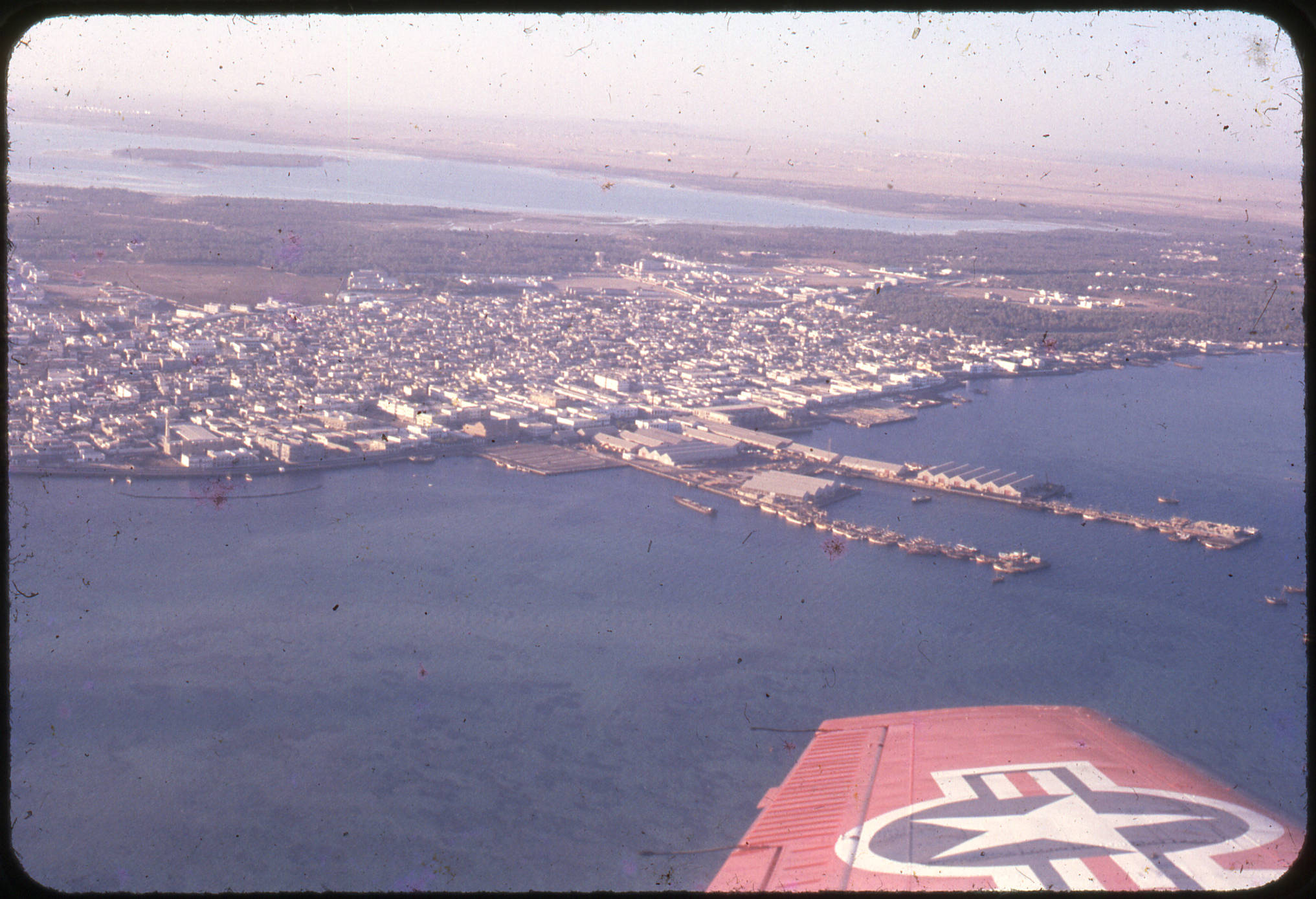
Aerial view of Manama from the north, 1961.

Following the rise of Arab nationalism across the Middle East and sparked by the Suez Crisis in 1956, anti-British unrest broke out in Manama, organised by the National Union Committee. Though the NUC advocated peaceful demonstrations, buildings and enterprises belonging to Europeans (the British in particular) as well as the main Catholic church in the city and petrol stations, were targeted and set ablaze. Demonstrations held in front of the British political residency called for the dismissal of Charles Belgrave, who was later dismissed by the direct intervention of the Foreign Office the following year. A subsequent crackdown on the NUC led to the dissolution of the body. Another anti-British uprising erupted in March 1965, though predominately led by students aspiring for independence rather than by Arab nationalists. (Note: These student protests were led by intellectuals and poets such as Qassim Haddad.) In 1968, the British announced their withdrawal from Bahrain by 1971. The newly independent State of Bahrain designated Manama as the capital city.

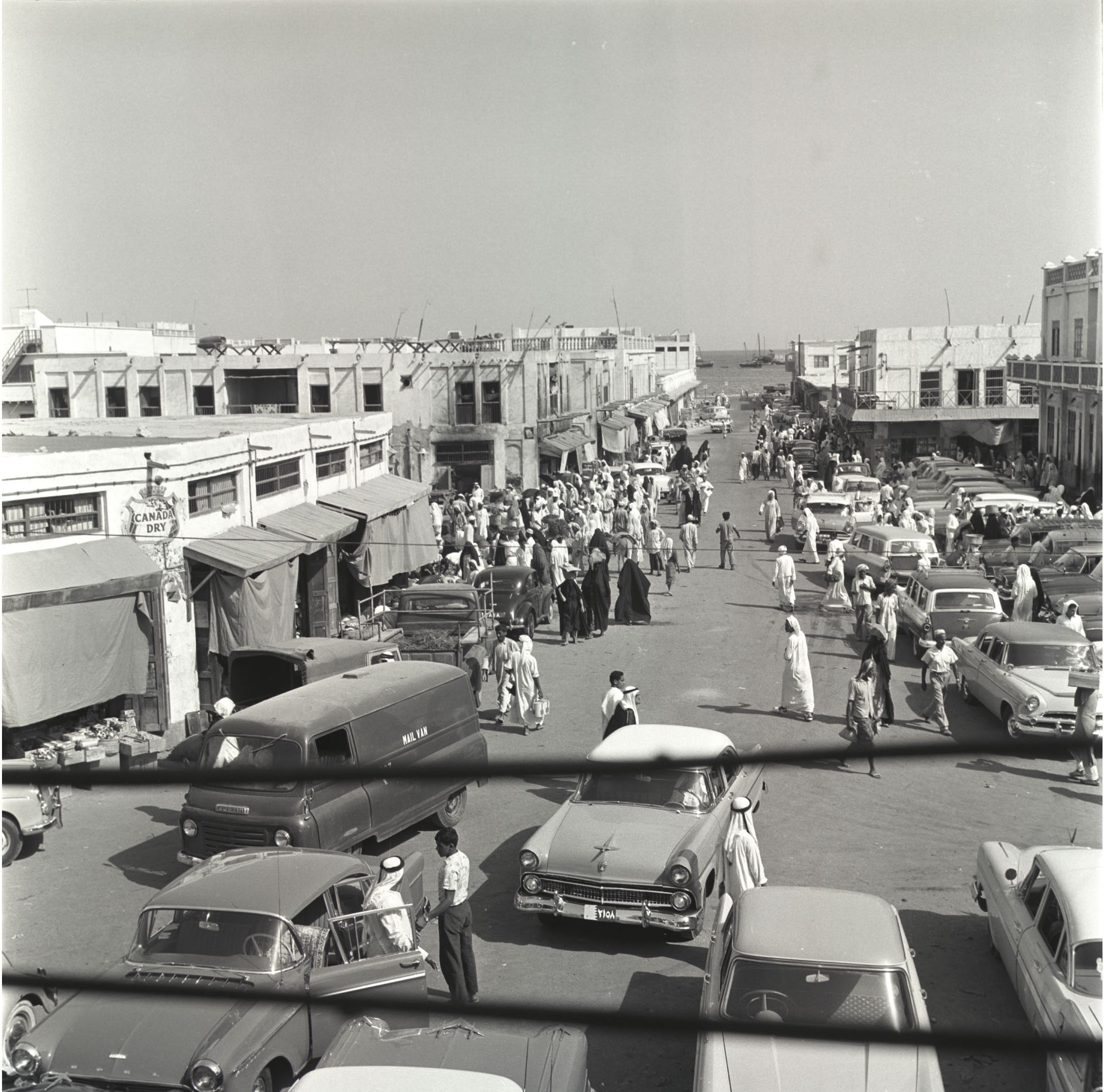
Manama Souq in 1965

Post-independence Manama was characterised by the rapid urbanisation of the city and the swallowing-up of neighboring villages and hamlets into a single urbanised area, incorporating new neighbourhoods such as Adliya and Salmaniya. The construction boom attracted large numbers of foreigners from the Indian subcontinent and by 1981, foreigners outnumbered Bahrainis two-to-one. The construction of the Diplomatic Area district in the city's northeast helped facilitate diversification of the country's economy from oil by exploiting the lucrative financial industry. Financial institutions in the district numbered 187 by 1986. The scarcity of land suitable for construction led to significant land reclamation in Bahrain. Religious activism migrated from Manama to the suburban districts of Bani Jamra, Diraz and Bilad Al Qadeem, hotspots of unrest in the 1990s uprising that called for the reinstatement of an elected parliament. In 2001, the National Action Charter, presented by King Hamad bin Isa al-Khalifa was approved by Bahrainis. The charter led to the first parliamentary and municipal elections in decades. Further elections in 2006 and 2010 led to the election of Islamist parties, Al Wefaq, Al Menbar, and Al Asalah, as well as independent candidates. In 2011, a month-long uprising led to the intervention of GCC forces and the proclamation of a three-month state of emergency. The Bahrain Independent Commission of Inquiry published a 500-page report on the events of 2011.

== Government ==
Historically, Manama has been restricted to what is now known as the Manama Souq and the Manama Fort (now the Ministry of Interior) to its south. However the city has now grown to include a number of newer suburban developments as well as older neighboring villages that have been engulfed by the growth of the city. The districts that make up Manama today include:

- Old Manama which include the following areas:
  - Manama Souq
  - Fareej el-Fadhel
  - Fareej el-Hammam
  - Fareej el-Hatab
  - Fareej el-Makharqa
  - Fareej Mushbir
- Awadhiya
- Adliya
- Bu Ashira
- Bu Ghazal
- Diplomatic Area
- Ghuraifa
- Gudaibiya
- Gufool
- Hoora
- Juffair
- Mahooz
- Noaim
- Ras Rumman
- Seef
- Seqaya
- Sulmaniya
- Umm Al Hassam
- Zinj

Manama in 1926

Manama is part of the Capital Governorate, one of five Governorates of Bahrain. Until 2002 it was part of the municipality of Al-Manamah. Councils exist within the governorates; eight constituencies are voted upon within Capital Governorate in 2006.

== Economy ==
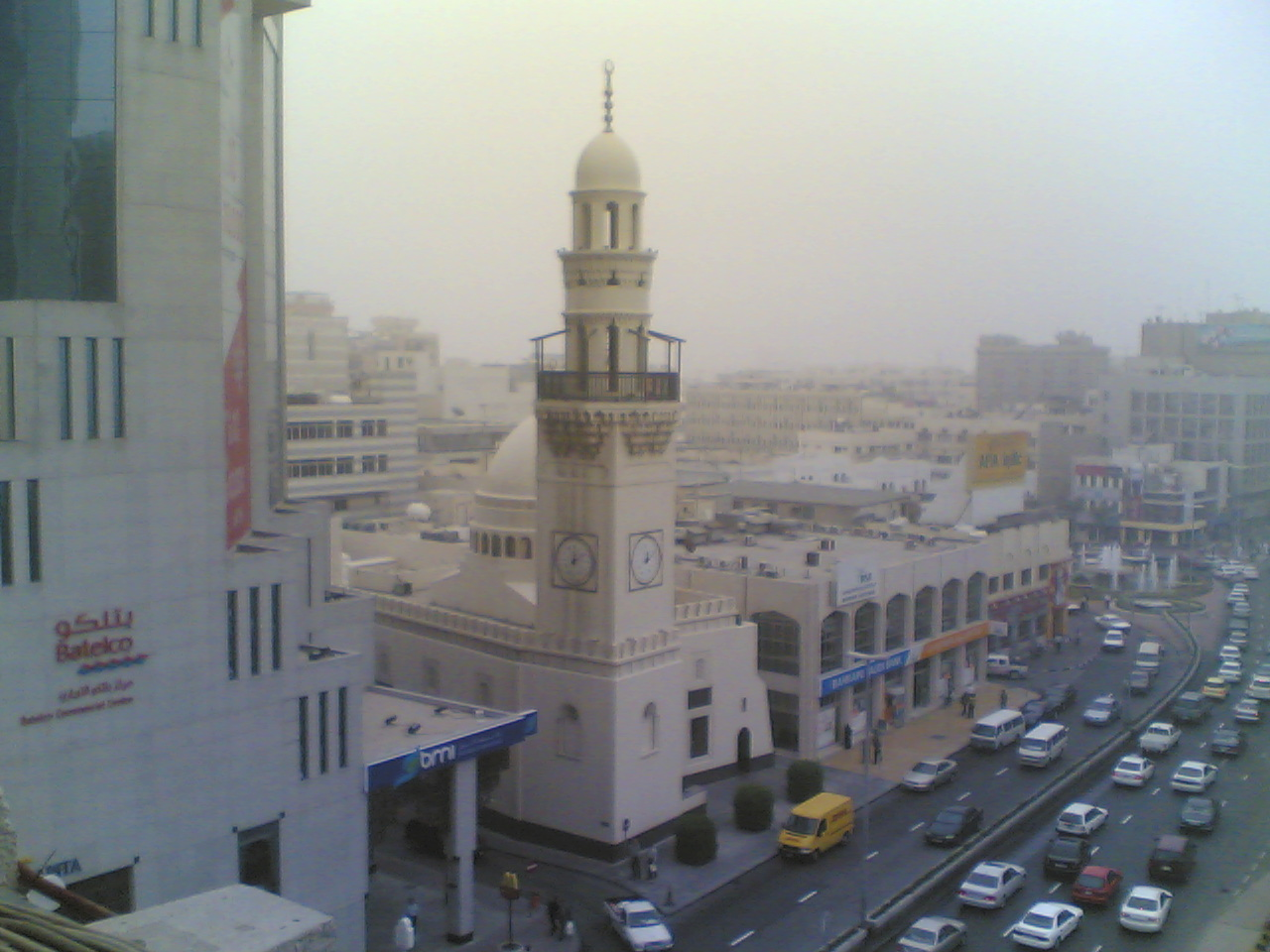
Central Manama

Bahrain Financial Harbour in Manama.

Manama is the focal point of the Bahraini economy. While petroleum has decreased in importance in recent years due to depleting reserves and growth in other industries, it is still the mainstay of the economy. Heavy industry (e.g. aluminium smelting, ship repair), banking and finance, and tourism are among the industries which have experienced recent growth. Several multinationals have facilities and offices in and around Manama. The primary industry in Manama itself is financial services, with over two hundred financial institutions and banks based in the CBD and the Diplomatic Area. Manama is a financial hub for the Persian Gulf region and a center of Islamic banking. There is also a large retail sector in the shopping malls around Seef, while the center of Manama is dominated by small workshops and traders.

Manama's economy in the early 20th century relied heavily on pearling; in 1907, the pearling industry was estimated to include 917 boats providing employment for up to 18,000 people. Shipbuilding also employed several hundred in both Manama and Muharraq. The estimated income earned from pearling in 1926 and subsequent years prior to the Great Depression was £1.5 million annually. Custom duties and tariffs served as the prime source of revenue for the government. With the onset of the Great Depression, the collapse of the pearling industry and the discovery of oil in 1932, the country's economy began to shift towards oil.

Historically, the ports at Manama were of poor reputation. The British described the ports importing systems as being "very bad – goods were exposed to the weather and there were long delays in delivery", in 1911. Indians began maintaining the ports and new resources were built on site, improving the situation. As of 1920, Manama was one of the main exporters of Bahrain pearls, attracting steamships from India. During this time, they also imported goods from India and from other regional countries. They imported rice, textiles, ghee, coffee, dates, tea, tobacco, fuel, and livestock. They exported less of a variety, with a focus on pearls, oysters, and sailcloth. For the year of 1911–12, Manama was visited by 52 steamships, the majority being British and the rest Turkish-Arabian.

== Demographics ==
Historical population
Year	Pop.	±%
1860s	8,000	—
1904	25,000	+212.5%
1941	27,835	+11.3%
1950	39,648	+42.4%
1959	61,726	+55.7%
1965	79,098	+28.1%
1971	88,785	+12.2%
1981	121,986	+37.4%
2010	329,510	+170.1%
Source: Bahrain Census 2010

The role of Manama as a regional port city in the Persian Gulf made it a hub for migrant workers in search of a better living. As a result, Manama has often been described, both in the pre-oil and post-oil era, as a cosmopolitan city. In 1904, it was estimated that Manama's population numbered 25,000, out of which half were believed to have been foreigners from Basra, Najd, al-Hasa and Iran, as well as from India and Europe.

=== Religion ===
The two main branches of Islam, Shia Islam and Sunni Islam, coexisted in Manama for centuries and are represented by distinct ethnic groups. The Shia community is represented by the native Arab Baharna, the Hasawis and Qatifis of mainland Arabia and the Persian Ajam. The Sunni community is represented by Arab Bedouin tribes who migrated in the eighteenth century along with the Bani Utbah and the Huwala.

== Transport ==
=== Road network ===
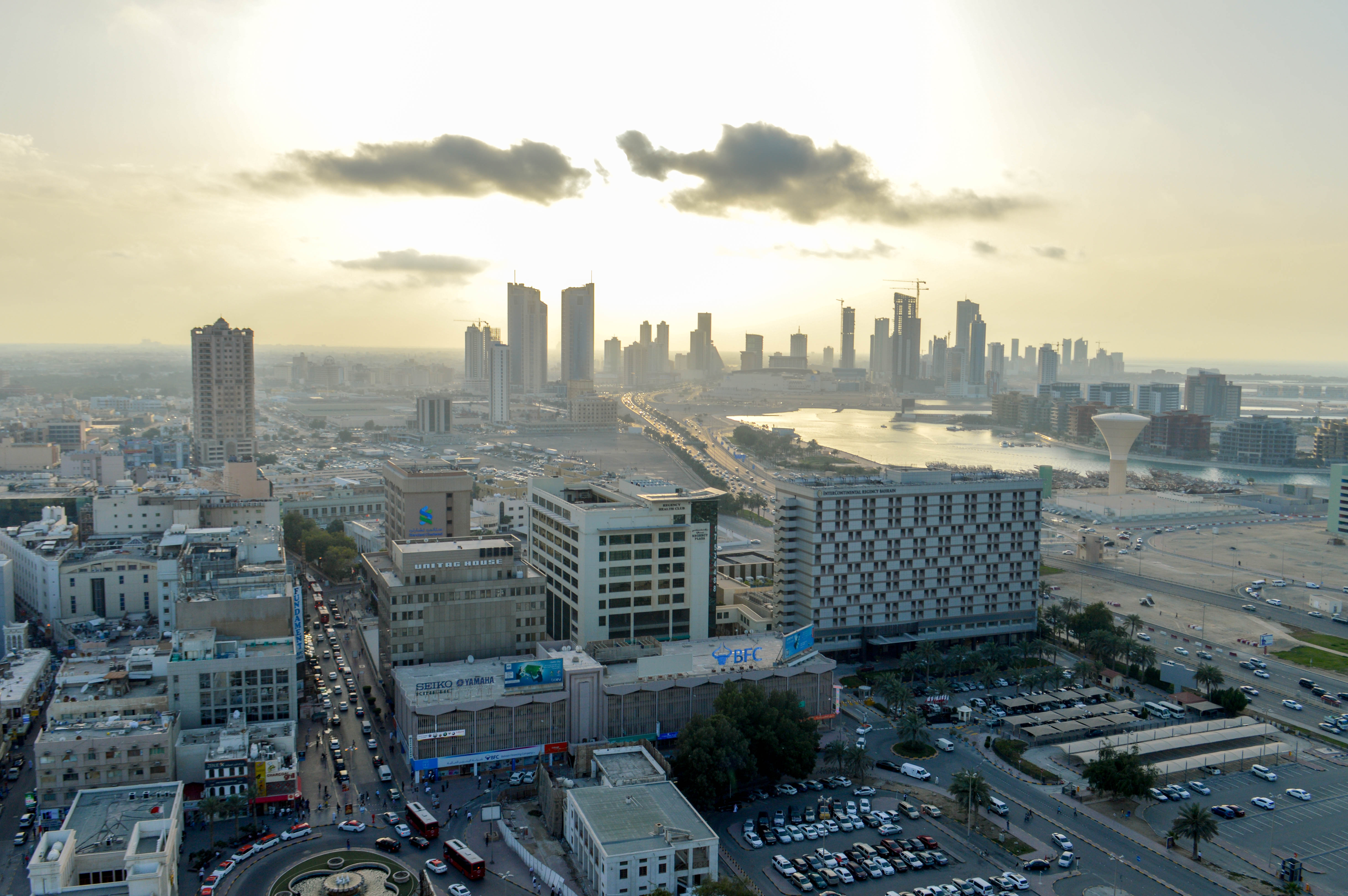
Aerial view of Manama City

Manama night view

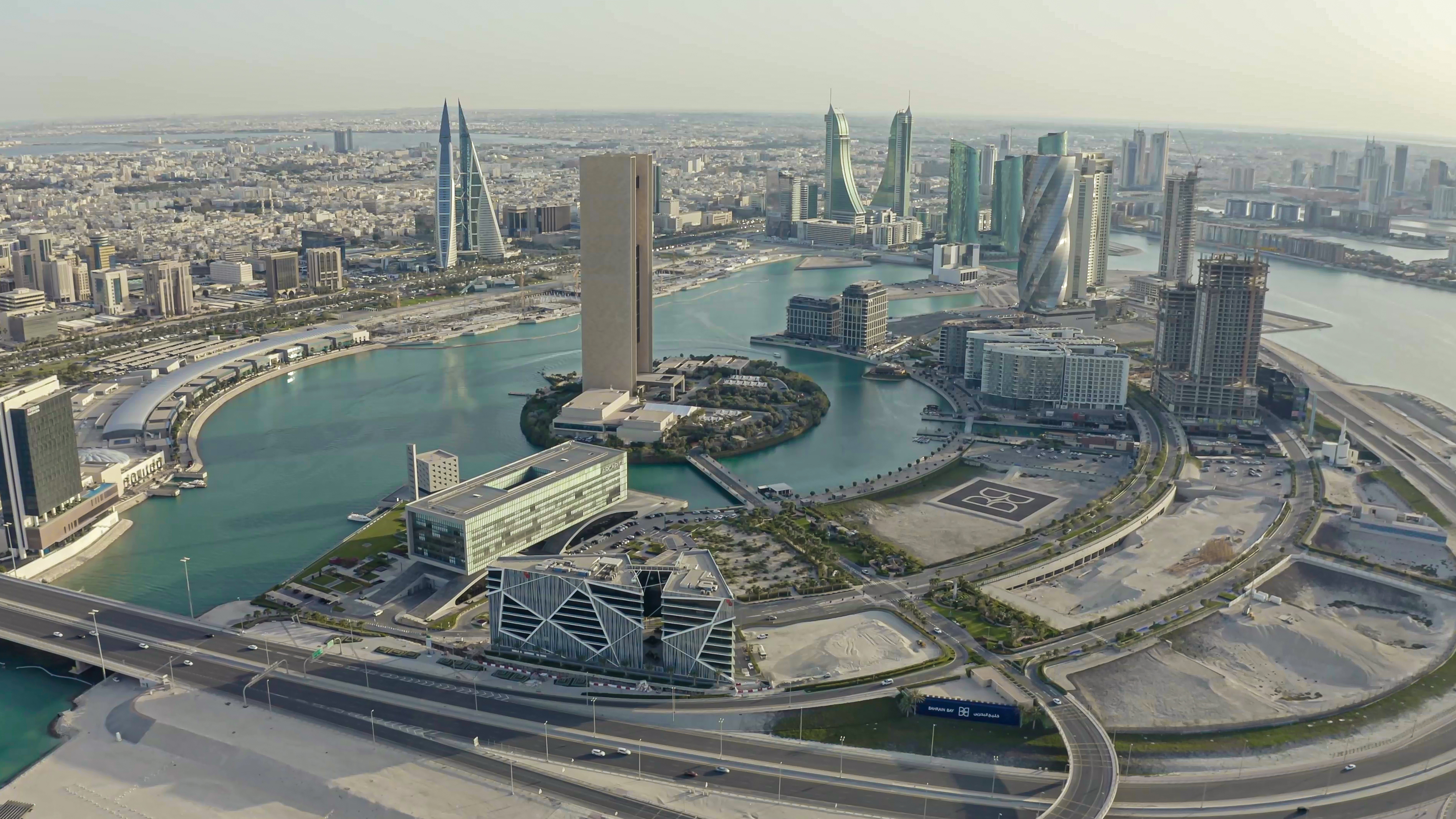
Bahrain Bay overview

Manama is the main hub of the country's road network. At the moment the city's road network is undergoing substantial development to ameliorate the situation of traffic in the city. Due to the fact that it is the capital and the main city in the country, where most of the government and the commercial offices and facilities are established, along with the entertainment centers, and the country's fast growth, vehicle population is increasing rapidly.

The widening of roads in the old districts of Manama and the development of a national network linking the capital to other settlements commenced as early as the arrival of the first car in 1914. The continuous increase in the number of cars from 395 in 1944, to 3,379 in 1954 and to 18,372 cars in 1970 caused urban development to primarily focus on expanding the road network, widening carriageways and the establishment of more parking spaces. Many tracks previously laid in the pre-oil era (prior to the 1930s) were resurfaced and widened, turning them into 'road arteries'. Initial widening of the roads started in the Manama Souq district, widening its main roads by demolishing encroaching houses.

A series of ring roads were constructed (Isa al Kabeer avenue in the 1930s, Exhibition avenue in the 1960s and Al Fateh highway in the 1980s), to push back the coastline and extend the city area in belt-like forms. To the north, the foreshore used to be around Government Avenue in the 1920s but it shifted to a new road, King Faisal Road, in the early 1930s which became the coastal road. To the east, a bridge connected Manama to Muharraq since 1929, a new causeway was built in 1941 which replaced the old wooden bridge. Transits between the two islands peaked after the construction of the Bahrain International Airport in 1932.

To the south of Manama, roads connected groves, lagoons and marshes of Hoora, Adliya, Gudaibiya and Juffair. Villages such as Mahooz, Ghuraifa, Seqaya served as the end of these roads. To the west, a major highway was built that linked Manama to the isolated village port of Budaiya, this highway crossed through the 'green belt' villages of Sanabis, Jidhafs and Duraz. To the south, a road was built that connected Manama to Riffa. The discovery of oil accelerated the growth of the city's road network.

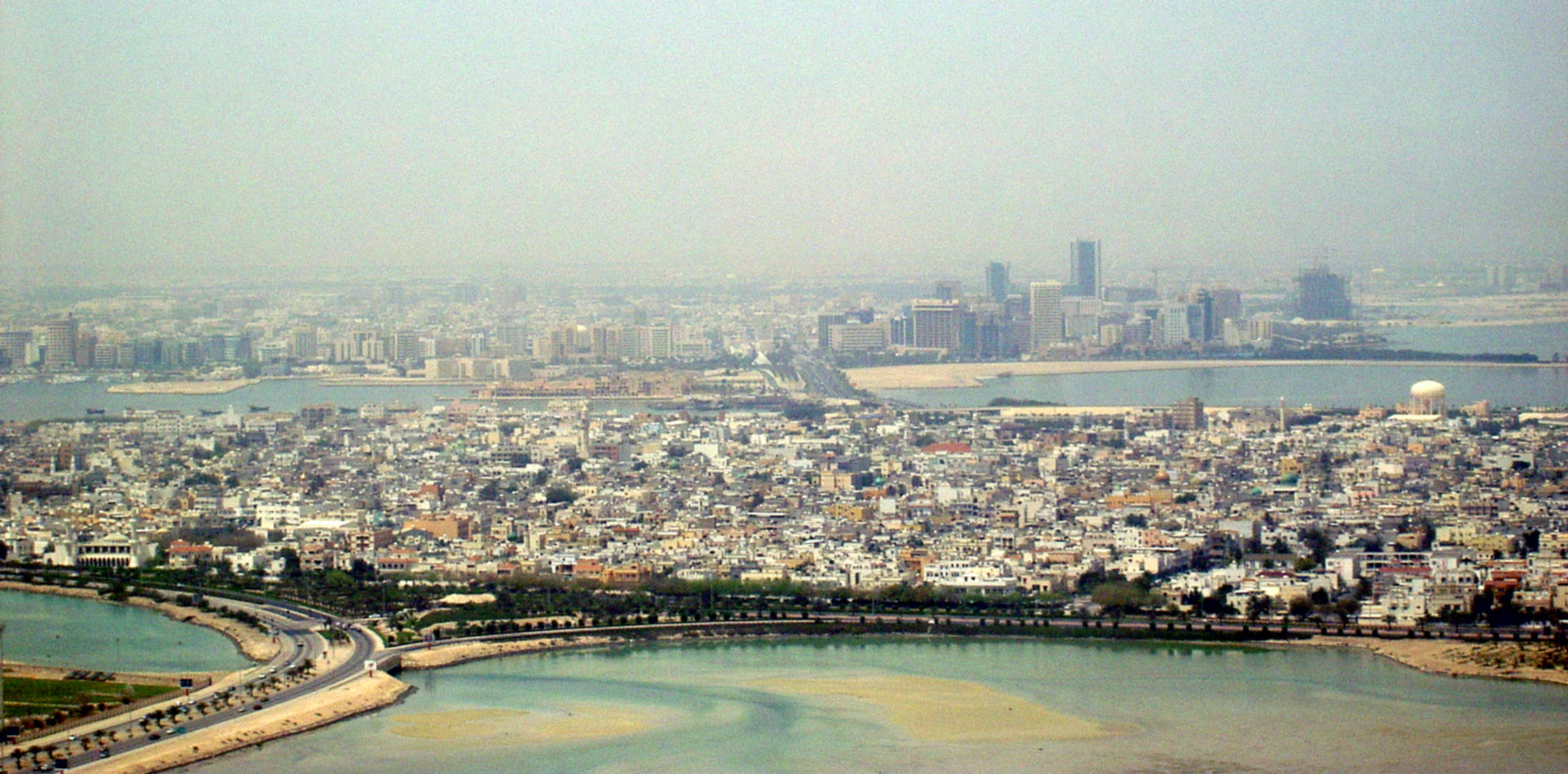
Muharraq

The four main islands and all the towns and villages are linked by well-constructed roads. There were 3,164 km (1,966 mi) of roadways in 2002, of which 2,433 km (1,512 mi) were paved. A causeway stretching over 2.8 km (2 mi), connect Manama with Muharraq Island, and another bridge joins Sitra to the main island. A four-lane highway atop a 24 km (15 mi) causeway, linking Bahrain with the Saudi Arabian mainland via the island of Umm an-Nasan was completed in December 1986, and financed by Saudi Arabia. In 2000, there were 172,684 passenger vehicles and 41,820 commercial vehicles.

Bahrain's port of Mina Salman can accommodate 16 oceangoing vessels drawing up to 11 m (36 ft). In 2001, Bahrain had a merchant fleet of eight ships of 1,000 GT or over, totaling 270,784 GT. Private vehicles and taxis are the primary means of transportation in the city.

=== Buses ===
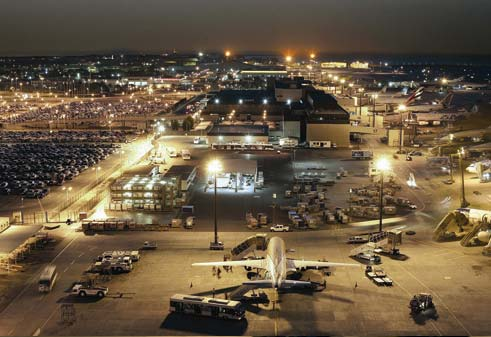
Bahrain International Airport

Manama has a bus service that launched on 1 April 2015, with a fleet of 141 MAN buses. Regulated by the Ministry of Transportation, bus routes extend across Bahrain and around Manama.

=== Air transport ===
Bahrain International Airport is located on the nearby Muharraq Island, approximately 7 km (4 mi) from the Central Business District (CBD). It is a premier hub airport in West Asia. Strategically located in the Northern Persian Gulf between the major markets of Saudi Arabia and Iran, the airport has one of the widest range and highest frequency of regional services with connections to major international destinations in Europe, Asia, Africa, and North America. Bahrain also has a military airbase, the Isa Air Base, located in the south at Sakhir. This is the base of the Bahrain Defence Force, or BDF.

== Education ==
The clock tower of the Applied Science University building

Quranic schools were the only source of education in Bahrain prior to the 20th century; such schools were primarily dedicated to the study of the Qur'an. The first modern school to open in the country was a missionary elementary school set up in 1892 (according to one account) in Manama by the Reformed Church in America, with the school's syllabus comprising English, Mathematics and the study of Christianity. Leading merchants in the country sent their children to the school until it was closed down in 1933 due to financial difficulties. The school reopened some years later under the name of Al Raja School where it operates till the present day. In addition to the American Mission School, another foreign private school was opened in 1910; Al-Ittihad school, funded by the Persian community of Bahrain.

Following the end of the First World War, Western ideas became more widespread in the country, culminating in the opening of the first public school of Bahrain, Al-Hidaya Al-Khalifia Boys school, in the island of Muharraq in 1919. The school was founded by prominent citizens of Muharraq and was endorsed by the Bahraini royal family. The country's first Education Committee was established by several leading Bahraini merchants, headed by Shaikh Abdulla bin Isa Al-Khalifa, the son of the then-ruler of Bahrain Isa ibn Ali Al Khalifa, who acted as the de facto Minister of Education. The Education Committee was also responsible for managing the Al-Hidaya Boys school. The school was, in fact, the brainchild of Shaikh Abdulla, who suggested the idea after returning from post-World War I celebrations in England.

In 1926, a second public school for boys opened up in Manama called the Jafaria School. Two years later, in 1928, the first public school for girls was established. Due to financial constraints suffered by the Education Committee, the Bahraini government took control of the schools in 1930.

Presently, Manama has a wide range of private and public universities and colleges such as Ahlia University, Applied Science University, Arab Open University, Arabian Gulf University, Bahrain Institute of Banking and Finance, and the College of Health and Sport Sciences. Other notable primary and secondary schools situated in the city include the Bahrain School, the Indian School, Al Raja School amongst others.

== Geography ==
The city is located in the north-eastern corner of Bahrain on a small peninsula. As in the rest of Bahrain, the land is generally flat (or gently rolling) and arid.

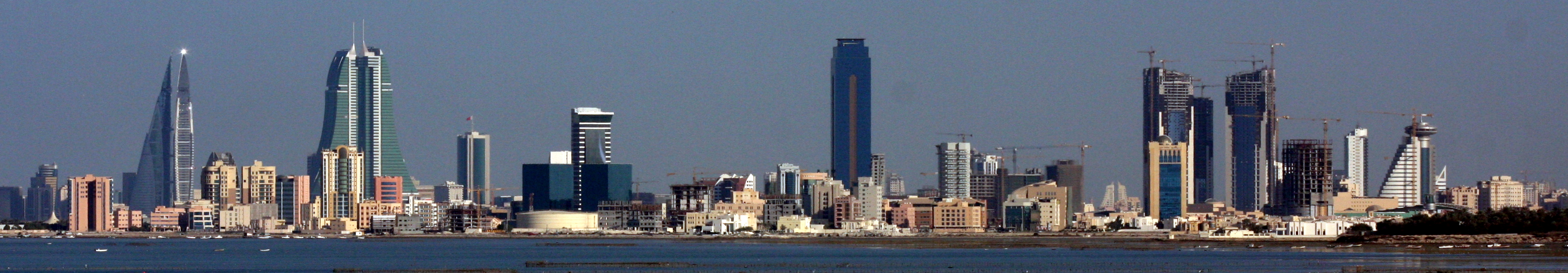
A panoramic view of the skyline of Manama in 2007 from left to right:1. The twin towers of the Bahrain WTC.
2. The twin towers of the Bahrain Financial Harbor (BFH).
3. The NBB tower (short building next to BFH).
4. The Almoayyed Tower (tallest in the photo, center of image).
5. The Abraj Al Lulu residential project (three towers) under-construction on the far-right).

=== Climate ===
Manama has an arid climate. In common with the rest of Bahrain, Manama experiences extreme climatic conditions, with summer temperatures up to 45 °C (113 °F), and winter as low as 7 °C (45 °F) with even hail on rare occasions. Average temperatures of the summer and winter seasons are generally from about 17 °C (63 °F) to about 34 °C (93 °F). The most pleasant time in Bahrain is spring when sunshine is comparatively low, coupled with mild temperatures moderated by soft breezes.

Climate data for Manama (Bahrain International Airport) 1991–2020 normals, extremes 1902–present
Month	Jan	Feb	Mar	Apr	May	Jun	Jul	Aug	Sep	Oct	Nov	Dec	Year
Record high °C (°F)	29.7 (85.5)	34.7 (94.5)	38.1 (100.6)	41.3 (106.3)	47.6 (117.7)	47.3 (117.1)	47.5 (117.5)	45.6 (114.1)	45.5 (113.9)	42.8 (109.0)	37.2 (99.0)	30.6 (87.1)	47.6 (117.7)
Mean daily maximum °C (°F)	20.7 (69.3)	22.0 (71.6)	25.5 (77.9)	30.6 (87.1)	36.1 (97.0)	38.6 (101.5)	39.7 (103.5)	39.6 (103.3)	37.7 (99.9)	34.0 (93.2)	28.0 (82.4)	22.9 (73.2)	31.3 (88.3)
Daily mean °C (°F)	17.5 (63.5)	18.4 (65.1)	21.3 (70.3)	26.0 (78.8)	31.1 (88.0)	34.0 (93.2)	35.1 (95.2)	35.1 (95.2)	33.2 (91.8)	29.9 (85.8)	24.6 (76.3)	19.7 (67.5)	27.2 (80.9)
Mean daily minimum °C (°F)	14.5 (58.1)	15.4 (59.7)	18.1 (64.6)	22.4 (72.3)	27.2 (81.0)	30.0 (86.0)	31.4 (88.5)	31.5 (88.7)	29.5 (85.1)	26.4 (79.5)	21.6 (70.9)	16.8 (62.2)	23.7 (74.7)
Record low °C (°F)	2.7 (36.9)	7.9 (46.2)	10.9 (51.6)	10.8 (51.4)	18.7 (65.7)	18.4 (65.1)	25.3 (77.5)	21.8 (71.2)	18.9 (66.0)	18.8 (65.8)	11.7 (53.1)	6.4 (43.5)	2.7 (36.9)
Average precipitation mm (inches)	18.1 (0.71)	13.0 (0.51)	14.7 (0.58)	7.5 (0.30)	8.0 (0.31)	0.0 (0.0)	0.0 (0.0)	0.0 (0.0)	0.0 (0.0)	0.9 (0.04)	16.8 (0.66)	15.2 (0.60)	94.2 (3.71)
Average precipitation days (≥ 1.0 mm)	2.5	1.9	2.5	1.3	0.3	0.0	0.0	0.0	0.0	0.2	1.6	2.3	12.6
Average relative humidity (%)	69.1	67.2	61.5	54.4	47.6	46.2	50.7	58.0	59.2	62.3	63.6	68.7	59.0
Average dew point °C (°F)	11.5 (52.7)	11.8 (53.2)	13.1 (55.6)	15.4 (59.7)	17.8 (64.0)	19.9 (67.8)	22.5 (72.5)	25.0 (77.0)	23.7 (74.7)	21.5 (70.7)	17.0 (62.6)	13.7 (56.7)	17.7 (63.9)
Mean monthly sunshine hours	232	221	245	256	316	344	337	334	316	306	249	235	3,391
Percentage possible sunshine	70	70	66	67	76	83	80	83	86	86	77	72	77
Average ultraviolet index	5	7	9	11	12	12	12	12	10	8	6	5	9
Source: NOAA, Meteo Climat (record highs and lows) and Weather Atlas (uv index)

== Culture ==
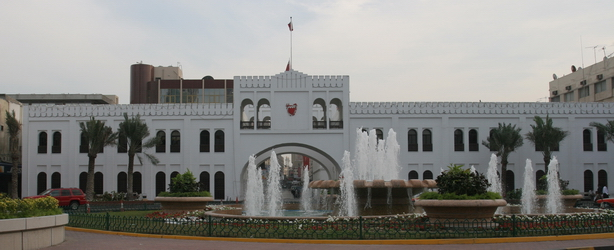
Bab Al Bahrain

Bahrain attracts a large number of foreigners and foreign influences, with about half of the population hailing from abroad. Alcohol is legal in the country, with bars and nightclubs operating in the city. Bahrain gave women the right to vote in elections for the first time in 2002. Football is the most popular sport in Manama (and the rest of the country), with three teams from Manama participating in the Bahraini Premier League.

Notable cultural sites within Manama include the Bab Al Bahrain and the adjacent souq area. In the 2010s, the historic core of Manama underwent revitalisation efforts alongside the Manama souq, which were due to be completed in 2020. The central areas of Manama are also the main location for Muharram processions in the country, attracting hundreds of thousands of people annually from Bahrain and across the Gulf.

== Notable people ==
- Khalid Abdul Rahim (born 1962), business magnate and construction tycoon
- Mahdi Abduljabbar (born 1991), footballer
- Muhammad Abdul Ghaffar Abdulla (born 1949), diplomat
- Hasan Abdulnabi (born 1989), tennis player
- Ayad Al Adhamy (born 1985), American multi-instrumentalist, producer
- Yusuf bin Ahmed Kanoo, merchant and trader
- Khalid Ahmed Mohamed (born 1976), sport shooter
- Mohammed bin Khalifa bin Ahmed (born 1975), politician and Minister for Oil and Gas
- Sayed Shubbar Alawi (born 1985), footballer
- Mohammed Tayeb Al Alawi (born 1989), footballer
- Salah Ali (born), politician
- Thuraya AlArrayed (born 1948), Saudi poet and writer
- Adel Al Asoomi (born 1969), businessman and politician
- Zainab Al Askari (born 1974), actress and screenwriter
- Kamil Al-Aswad (born 1994), footballer
- Ali Assadalla (born 1993), Qatari footballer
- Khalid Baba (born 1996), swimmer
- Hussain Ali Baba (born 1982), footballer
- Ali Bahar (1960–2011), musician
- Ibrahim Bahar (1956–2019), actor
- Ahmed Al-Bahar, politician
- Taqi Baharna (born 1930), poet, diplomat and businessman
- Abdul Rahman Al Bakir (1917–1971), activist and independence leader
- Sayed Baqer (born 1994), footballer
- Ebrahim Bashmi (born 1947), politician, novelist, journalist
- Ahmed Behzad, politician
- Faisal Buressli (born 1961), former basketball player and current coach
- Sabrin Burshid (1985–2019), actress and broadcaster
- Gayan de Silva (born 1988), cricketer
- Ahmed Al Derazi (born 1990), basketballer
- Cyriaco Dias (born 1937), Indian actor and playwright
- Mohamed Duaij Mahorfi (born 1981), footballer
- Kenny Ejim (1994–2022), Canadian basketballer
- Karim Fakhrawi (c.1962–2011), publisher
- Hamad Al Fardan (born 1987), racing driver
- Tareq Al-Farsani (born 1972), bodybuilder
- Jacqueline Fernandez (born 1985), Sri Lankan actress and model
- Naeema al-Gasseer, nurse and midwife
- Parween Habib (born 1969), journalist and poet
- Habib Haroon (born 2000), footballer
- Alawi al-Hashimi (born 1948), poet and academic
- Mohammed Hadi Al Halwaji, poet and politician
- Abd al-Hussein al-Hilli (1883–1956), Iraqi Ja’afari jurist and poet
- Rashed Al-Hooti (born 1989), footballer
- Mahdi Al-Humaidan (born 1993), footballer
- Mohamed Husain (born 1980), footballer
- Sami Al-Husaini (born 1989), footballer
- Ahmed Juma (born 1999), footballer
- Ali Al Jallawi (born 1975), poet, researcher
- Ahmed Salman Kamal (1930–2017), politician, journalist, writer, and broadcaster
- Hassan Salman Kamal (born 1942), poet and broadcaster
- Saud Kanoo (born 1959), businessman and politician
- Abdul Latif Jassim Kanoo (born 1935), structural engineer and writer
- Saud Kanoo (born 1959), politician
- Hussain Karimi (born 1983), racing drive
- Abdurahman Khadr (born 1982), Guantanamo detainee
- Ahmed Al Khalifa (1929–2004), poet
- Meriam bint Abdullah Al Khalifa (born 1980), member of the Bahraini Royal House of Al-Khalifa
- Khalid bin Ahmed Al Khalifa (born 1960), diplomat and former foreign affairs Minister
- Rashid bin Khalifa Al Khalifa (born 1952), member of the Bahraini royal family
- Abdullah bin Isa Al Khalifa (1883–1966), politician and judge
- Fawaz bin Mohammed Al Khalifa (born 1965) diplomat and prince of the Kingdom of Bahrai
- Abdullah bin Mohammad bin Rashed Al Khalifa (born 1960), diplomat
- Mubarak bin Rashid Al Khater (1935–2001), historian and writer
- Ebrahim Al-Khattal (born 2000), footballer
- Jasim Khelaif (born 1998), footballer
- Ebrahim Lutfalla (born 1992), footballer
- Phoebe Licence (born 1999), English footballer
- James Love (born 1987), English rugby union player
- Khalid Al Maskati (born 1959), businessman and politician
- Ahmed Merza (born 1991), footballer
- Mamta Mohandas (born 1984), Indian actress and film producer
- Aqeel al-Mosawi (born 1966), novelist, photographer and endodontist
- Abdullah Al Muharraqi (born 1939), artist
- Isa Ali Abdullah al Murbati (born 1965), Guantanamo detainee
- Fahad Al Musalam (born 1974), racing driver
- Dhiyaa Al-Musawi (born 1970), politician and former cleric
- Ahmed Nabeel (born 1995), footballer
- Abdulla Majid Al Naimi (born 1982), Guantanamo detainee
- Houda Nonoo (born 1964), diplomat
- Rachel Peters (born 1991), Filipino model and beauty pageant titleholder
- Yusuf Qaed (born 1994), tennis player
- Khalifah Hassan Qassim (1940–2005), poet, journalist, and naval officer
- Abdul Rahman Rafi (1936–2015), poet
- Mohamed Al-Romaihi (born 1990), footballer
- Abdulwahab Al-Safi (born 1984), footballer
- Amin Saleh (born 1950), author, scriptwriter, poet
- Mamdouh Abbas Al Saleh (born 1973), art director and politician
- Ahmed Al-Salloum, politician and businessman
- Hashim Sayed Isa (born 1998), footballer
- Mohamed Ali Al-Shaaban (born 1986), television personality and surgeon
- Mohammed Shahid (born 1989), businessman and mixed martial artist
- Jasim Al-Shaikh (born 1996), footballer
- Abdulla Shallal (born 1993), footballer
- Abdul Hakim Al-Shammari (born 1965), businessman and politician
- Hamad Al-Shamsan (born 1997), footballer
- Ali Al Shargawi (born 1948), poet, lyricist and playwright
- Ibrahim Sharif (born 1957), opposition political activist
- Sadiq Al Shehabi (1944–2017), politician
- Cecile Sinclair (born 1987), British-Dutch model
- Fawziyya al-Sindi (born 1957), poet and activist
- Vikramjit Singh Rooprai (born 1983), Indian author and educator
- Ghanem Al Sulaiti (born 1956), Qatari playwright and actor
- Ahmed Al-Taan (1835-1898), cleric and jurist
- Bassam Al-Thawadi (born 1960), filmmaker and film director
- Hala Al Turk (born 2002), actress and singer
- Frank Turner (born 1981), English punk and folk singer-songwriter
- Manasy Veetinal, Indian actress
- Abdulla Yaser (born 1988), footballer
- Afnan Al Zayani, chef

== Twin towns and sister cities ==
- Kuwait City, Kuwait
- Doha, Qatar
- Tunis, Tunisia (1999)
- Tripoli, Lebanon (1977)
- Dubai, United Arab Emirates
- Chiang Mai, Thailand
- Amman, Jordan
- Ta'if, Saudi Arabia
- Singapore

== See also ==
- Outline of Bahrain
