= Mohammed Hadi Al Halwaji =

Politician

Mohammed Hadi Ahmed Mansour Al Halwaji (Arabic: محمد هادي أحمد منصور الحلواجي) is a Bahraini poet and politician.

== Biography ==
Al Halwaji was born in Manama. He earned a high school and management diploma.

He joined the Ministry of Electricity in 1987, then in 2000 shifted to the Ministry of Justice. For a time the Assistant Secretary-General of the Supreme Council for Islamic Affairs, he was appointed to the Consultative Council, the upper house of Parliament, in 2002. He served on the Council from 2002 to 2014, resigning briefly in March 2011 in protest of the suppression of the Bahraini uprising of 2011 before retracting it a month later.
