= Ahmed Salman Kamal =

Bahraini politician and journalist

- أحمد سلمان كمال
- Born: 1 January 1930; Manama, Bahrain
- Died: May 9, 2017 (aged 87)
- Resting place: Manama Cemetery
- Years active: 1944—2017

Ahmed Salman Kamal (Arabic: أحمد سلمان كمال, January 1, 1930, Manama—May 9, 2017, Riffa) was a Bahraini politician, journalist, writer, and broadcaster.

== Early life and education ==
Kamal was born on January 1, 1930, in Bahrain’s capital of Manama. His father was an intellectual who curated a commercial library, co-founded the publisher al-Muntada al-Islami (Arabic: المنتدى الإسلامي) in 1928, and managed the local branch of the British Library. As a youth, he became a Hafiz by memorizing the Quran, and went on to graduate from Manama’s Naim Secondary Boys School in 1944.

== Early journalism career ==
Kamal started his career in the federal school supply Department, but two years later joined the Ministry of Education. In 1956, he became a secretary at Al Sharqiyah School in Manama. Becoming interested in literature, he began to write for the magazine Sawt al-Bahrain. He edited for the newspaper Al-Qafila from 1953 to 1954, during summer vacation from school. From 1957 to 1963, he worked as a broadcaster, presenter, writer, and producer for Bahrain Radio and Television Corporation. In 1961, he took a six-month course at the BBC in London. He briefly directed Al-Adwaa Press, but he left in 1966 for the publications department of the Information Affairs Authority (then the Ministry of Information). He was editor-in-chief of Hana Bahrain magazine there, and from 1973 to 1979 he served as the Ministry’s Director of Publications. From 1979 to 1995, he served as editor-in-chief of Akhbar Al Khaleej and supervised publication of its sister publication, the Gulf Daily News, for which he wrote a weekly article dealing with local, Arab, and global issues.

== Political career ==
In 1992, Kamal was appointed to the Consultative Council, the nation’s upper house, in which he remained until 1999.

== Return to journalism ==
Kamal continued to write for the local press on a daily basis. He has written many literary works and short stories.

== Death ==
Kamal died at his home on May 9, 2017, and was buried the next day in Manama Cemetery.

== Personal life ==
Kamal married and had two sons and four daughters.

== Work ==
Kamal is one of the pioneers of the short story in Bahrain, as he wrote more than 50 stories published in several collections. “المجنونة,” (“Crazy”), “جناية أب” (“Father’s Crime”), and “الكأس الأخيرة” (“The Last Cup”) are among the highlights.

A number of publications have been issued about it him, such as أحمد كمال صحفياً وقاصاً (“Ahmed Kamal, Journalist and Storyteller,” Makki Muhammad Sarhan) and أحمد سلمان كمال .. عطاء بلا حدود (“Ahmed Salman Kamal…Giving Without Borders,” Dr. Muhammad Sarhan).
