= Ibrahim Bahar =

Bahraini actor (1956–2019)

- إبراهيم بحر
- Born: Ibrahim Khamis Ibrahim Bahr; August 2, 1956; Manama, Bahrain
- Died: February 15, 2019 (aged 62); Manama
- Education: Saint Joseph University
- Occupation: actor
- Relatives: Ali Bahar

Ibrahim Bahar (Arabic: إبراهيم بحر, August 2, 1956—February 15, 2019) was a Bahraini actor.

== Biography ==
Ebrahim Bahar is the older brother of Bahraini singer Ali Bahar. A leading actor and director on the Bahraini theatre scene, he graduated from the Higher Institute of Dramatic Arts in 1982 and earned a postgraduate degree at Saint Joseph University in Beirut. He married and had four daughters and a son. He was the Director of Radio and Television Production for a time at the Center for Educational Technologies, part of the Ministry of Education. Bahar featured and sometimes directed many plays and television series in Bahrain and around the Gulf states.

== Death ==
Ebrahim Bahar died on Friday, February 15, 2019, after a struggle with kidney disease. Several prominent actors mourned him on social media.
