= Khalifah Hassan Qassim =

- خليفة حسن قاسم
- Born: 1940; Al Hidd, Bahrain
- Died: November 5, 2005 (aged 64–65); Manama
- Education: University of Mumbai, University of Southampton
- Occupations: poet, journalist, naval officer
- Organization: Federation of Arab Journalists

Khalifah Hassan Qassim (Arabic: خليفة حسن قاسم, Al Hidd, 1940 – November 5, 2005, Manama) was a Bahraini poet, journalist, and naval officer. He earned a Certificate of Proficiency in Navigation from the Australian Maritime Safety Authority. Qassim worked as a teacher, journalist, and naval officer. He co-founded the Kuwaiti magazine Al-Nahda and Al-Bairaq Military Magazine, as well as his own publishing house, Maisarah Press. He has published poetry collections and books in various fields.

== Biography ==
Khalifah bin Hassan bin Jassim Qassim Al-Rabiah was born in 1940 in the city of Al Hidd. He graduated from Bahrain School in 1957, going on to study economics and political science at the University of Mumbai and oceanography at the University of Southampton. He earned a certificate of navigation in Australia as well.

He returned to his homeland to work as a teacher, journalist, and naval officer. Qassim co-founded the Kuwaiti magazine Al-Nahda, the military magazine Al-Bairaq, and the general-interest magazine Al-Maisarah, the latter the namesake of his publishing house. He also helped edit Akhbar Al Khaleej from the beginning, including his commentary column "Tash ma Tash."

He was appointed Secretary of the League of Arab Students in India, and was an observer member of the Federation of Arab Journalists from 1979 to 1990. He spent several years as a tourism consultant for the Ministry of Information.

Qassim died on November 5, 2005, of an illness from which he had suffered for his last two years.

== Works ==
Poetry collections:

- أخي الجندي العربي ("My Brother, the Arab Soldier"), 1967
- حادي بادي من مقامات الحد أبادي ("Hadi Badi from the Al-Haddabadi Maqama"), 1988

Non-fiction:

- نهج الأوائل والاواخر ("Early and Late Approaches")
- الموجز في تاريخ البحرين السياسي ("A Brief Political History of Bahrain")
