= Ahmed Al-Salloum =

Bahraini politician

- أحمد صباح سلمان السلوم
- In office 2018–2022
- Monarch: Hamad bin Isa Al Khalifa
- Prime Minister: Khalifa bin Salman Al Khalifa
- Constituency: 5th District, Central Governorate

Personal details
- Party: Independent
- Occupation: Businessman

Ahmed Sabah Salman Al-Salloum (Arabic: أحمد السلوم (born in Salmaniya) is a Bahraini politician, businessman, author, and columnist. He has served as a Member of Parliament since December 12, 2018, for the Fifth District of the Capital Governorate.

== Education ==
He went to Al-Mutanabbi Primary Boys' School in Gudaibiya and Naim Secondary School. Earning top grades in physics and mathematics at the latter, he obtained a government scholarship to study electrical engineering at the University of Bahrain. Although his grades were high, he convinced his mother to let him change his major to management information systems.

== Personal life ==
Al-Salloum is married and has three daughters: Fatima, Zainab, and Amna.

== Career ==
His father was a close friend of Ali bin Yousif Fakhro, the late chair of the Bahrain Chamber of Commerce and Industry. From the age of eight, Al-Salloum accompanied his father to Fakhro's store to discuss business matters, eventually joining Fakhro at the age of twelve on tours to the Chamber headquarters at Al-Ahsa Oasis and to Kuwait after Fakhro was appointed in 1989. Al-Salloum's father was a government employee, but his paternal grandfather, mother, and uncles worked in the private sector.

He trained at the Bahrain Flour Mills Company at a time when the Chamber was pushing computerization, and what was supposed to be two months of training became a year in which he studied at night after working the early shift. Each week, he moved to a different department to study its function.

He was hired on to the international sales division. Among his achievements was a deal to supply Somali merchants with flour in exchange for livestock imports. Somali customers would open credit accounts in Bahraini banks to maintain the trade, and the merchants began importing feed from the company as well.

Al-Salloum left Bahrain Flour Mills in 1998 to start his own mobile phone dealership in 1998, and then began investing in restaurants and cafés. Struggling to invest in troubled restaurants from 2000 to 2005, he turned to real estate in 2006.

== National Assembly ==
He entered politics by running for the fifth district in the Capitol Governorate section of the National Assembly. The first round was held on November 24, 2018, and he earned 1,364 votes for 42.64%, necessitating a second round on December 1. On the night before the runoff, a video spread on social media showing the brother of his opponent, Nasser Al-Qusayr, trading electrical devices and cash for pledges on a Quran to vote for Al-Qusayr. On the morning of the 1st, the Higher Committee for Supervising the Safety of Elections nevertheless authorized the vote, which was marred by riots over the matter. Security forces apprehended the alleged perpetrators, mostly women. In the end, Al-Salloum defeated Al-Qusayr, the deputy speaker of the House from 2014 to 2018, earning 1891 votes for 69.17%.

== Publications ==
- كتاب المؤسسات الصغيرة: رؤية خاصة (“Small Business: A Special Vision”)
