= Seqaya =

Seqaya (Arabic: السقية) is a suburb located in the Kingdom of Bahrain. It used to be a village separate from the capital Manama, but rapid urbanization of the city engulfed the village. It is predominantly a residential area and lies close to Salmaniya.

It is the site of the annual Seqaya Ramadan Soccer Tournament, held in the month of Ramadan. The area is also home to the Bahrain Keraleeya Samajam.

== History ==
According to British historian J. G. Lorimer's Gazetteer of the Persian Gulf, the village was described as having 40 huts inhabited by the Baharna, who were growing date palms. Lucerne was stated to have been grown alongside 700 palm trees. Lorimer also mentions the presence of a Hindu house in the village.
