= Abd al-Hussein al-Hilli =

Iraqi Islamic scholar and poet

- عبد الحسين الحلي
- Born: Abd al-Hussein bin Al-Qasim bin Saleh al-Hilli; 1883; Hillah, Iraq
- Died: March 14, 1956 (aged 72–73); Manama, Bahrain

Philosophical work
- School: Twelver Shia Islam
- Language: Arabic, Ottoman Turkish
- Main interests: fiqh, poetry, teaching

Abd al-Hussein bin Al-Qasim bin Saleh al-Hilli (Arabic: عبد الحسين بن القاسم بن صالح الحلّي, born 1883, died March 14, 1956) was an Iraqi Ja’afari jurist and poet. Born in Hillah, he studied fiqh (Islamic jurisprudence) in Najaf with leading scholars in the field from 1896 to 1902, then taught the subject. He held the position of Ja’afari Sharia Cassation Judge in Bahrain, where he spent twenty years. In addition to his prowess in judicial studies and Arabic literature, he played a role in reforming the Ottoman Turkish language. He wrote an extensive body of poetry, and died in Bahrain's capital of Manama.

== Biography ==
Born in Hillah, Iraq, in 1883, Al-Hilli belonged to a prominent family there. He lived in Hillah until the age of thirteen, when he moved to Najaf for his studies. Among his instructors in Najaf were Sheikh Fethullah Qa'ravi Isfahani, Mohammed Kazem Yazdi, and Muhammad Kadhim Khorasani, the last-named having been his instructor in ijtihad. Among al-Hilli's most prominent students were Ahmed Al-Waeli, Syed Kamal al-Din al-Gharifi al-Bahrani, and Muhammad Ali Zain al-Din al-Darazi.

Al-Hilli worked as a Cassation Judge in the Ja’afari Sharia Courts of Bahrain from 1935 to 1955.

He died at his home in Manama of an incurable disease, and his funeral took place on March 15, 1956.

== Personal life ==
He had children with each of his two wives. He and his Iraqi wife had three sons and two daughters, among the sons an Abdul Amir. With his Bahraini wife, who died on February 18, 2007, he had two sons (Faiq and Muhammad Hadi) and three daughters.

== Works ==
- حياة الشريف الرضي (“Life of Al-Sharif al-Radi”)
- شرح منظمة في الإرث (“Exegesis of a Community’s Legacy”)
- مسائل فقهيّة (“Issues of Fiqh)
- ديوان شعر (“Collected Poetry”)

Examples of his poetry are included in Sheikh Ali al-Khaqani's شعراء الغري (“Allure of Poetry”).
