= Saud Kanoo =

Bahraini businessman and politician

Saud Abdul Aziz Kanoo (Arabic: سعود عبد العزيز كانو; born November 23, 1959) is a Bahraini businessman and politician. He became a member of the Shura Council in 2002.

== Career ==
Kanoo was born in Manama on November 23, 1959. He received a Bachelor of Science in Civil Engineering from Georgia Tech in 1980 and a Master of Business Administration with an Economics concentration from Mercer University in 1984.

At first he worked in the Ministry of Housing, but then he went into the private sector, working as a real estate developer at Yusuf Bin Ahmed Kanoo. He also served on boards for USS Real Estate Development Company, Nuetel Communications, and Saraya Contractors. Kanoo has been vice-president of Real Estate at YBA Kanoo as well as an administrator at Abdul Rahman Kanoo International School. He was appointed to the Shura Council and served there from 2002 to 2010.
