= Hassan Salman Kamal =

Bahraini poet and radio personality

Hassan Salman Kamal (Arabic: حسن سلمان كمال; born September 1942) is a Bahraini poet and broadcaster. He was born in Manama. He started working for the Bahrain Radio and Television Corporation (BRTC) in 1959, rising from an editor and broadcaster up to the directorship until his retirement in 1988. He held the position of Secretary-General of the National Council for Culture, Arts, and Letters. He has also published several books of poetry and songs.

== Biography ==
Hassan bin Salman bin Muhammad-Hassan Bukamal was born in September 1942 in the Fareej el-Fadhel neighborhood of Manama. He obtained a high school diploma with a teacher's emphasis and proceeded to attend several courses on media.

He worked as a broadcaster, programmer, and presenter on the national radio from 1959 to 1980, directing all radio programming from 1980 to 1988. In 1988, he was appointed the BRTC Director of Culture and Arts, also serving as Secretary-General of the National Council for Culture, Arts, and Letters. He has written for Bahrain magazine. He is a member of the Board of Trustees of the Shaikh Ebrahim bin Mohammad Al Khalifa Center for Culture and Research in Muharraq.

== Work ==
He wrote many poems, ranging from formal poetry to colloquial works influenced by that of Al-Mawal Al-Sabai to popular songs. He wrote a libretto for at least one Bahraini operetta in classical Arabic.

== Personal life ==
He is married to broadcaster Aisha Abdul Latif, and they have four children: Khaled, Salman, Rehab, and Dana.

== Awards ==
State Award for National Achievements (1992) First Class Efficiency Medal from King Hamad bin Isa Al Khalifa (2002) Bahrain History and Antiquities Society Lifetime Achievement Award (May 27, 2009)

== Books ==
ذكرياتي مع الإذاعة (“My Memories of Radio,” 2006)
