= Al Raja School =

Coordinates: 26.2323°N 50.5846°E

- Manama; Bahrain

Information
- Type: Private
- Established: 1899
- Principal: Nicky Perfect
- Grades: K-12
- Colors: Navy gold
- Mascot: ARS Lions
- Accreditation: Cognia (previously known as AdvancEd)
- Website: alrajabahrain.org

Al Raja School, commonly abbreviated as "ARS", is a private, bilingual, coeducational, multicultural non-profit K-12 institution in the capital city Manama, in the Kingdom of Bahrain. Founded in 1899 by Amy Zwemer as the country's first Western school, it was formerly known as the Acorn School and then as the American Mission School. Located in near proximity of the heart of the capital, Al Raja School lies adjacent to the American Mission Hospital, Bahrain's financial and diplomatic area.

== History ==
In 1899, Amy Zwemer saw a need. There were a few students - her daughters and a few other girls from the neighborhood - who were eager and ready to learn. Armed with only a few books and an enthusiasm that was second to none, Ms. Zwemer met with these seven girls on her back porch and taught writing and reading. She called her school The Acorn School. Connected with the American Mission Hospital, and the work directed by her husband, Samuel Zwemer, her little school began to grow. In less than three years, there was a need for a school building to be built.

With donations from churches from the Reformed Church in America in the US, a church and school building was built in 1902. Every day 10-15 students attended to learn reading, writing and arithmetic. In the afternoons, trade crafts were taught by American staff and Bahraini members of the community. The school continued to grow over the years, eventually becoming an all girls school. In the 1930s, there was a demand to begin a formal boys section in the school. Eventually the school became known as the American Mission School, the name by which many in the community know it today, serving students from KG - Grade 9. During that time it held classes at the church facilities, which themselves morphed and changed over the decades.

In 1994, the current campus was built, and the school moved to its current campus. In the early 2000s, grades 10, 11, and 12 were added, and the first graduating class walked in 2008. Most recently, the school has added the Advanced Placement curriculum for students, and earned accreditation with AdvancED. The school continues to work towards building strong community through building strong students.

== Academics ==
The school offers the American Diploma and is accredited by Cognia, previously known as AdvancED, an American accreditation agency. The Ministry of Education has also approved the high school diploma as equivalent to their Tawjihi High School Diploma. Students in grades 11 and 12 have the option of taking Advanced Placement courses.

Some of the classes provided by the school include:

- Languages: English, Arabic.
- Sciences: Chemistry, Biology, Physics, Math, Environmental Science with their respective laboratories
- Perspectives and Social Sciences: 20th Century History, Economics, Social Studies, Geography, Civics, Health, Sociology
- Religion: Islamic studies, Christian Religious studies.
- Miscellaneous: Visual Arts, Physical Education, C.A.S, Computer Science, Accounting, Business Math

== See also ==
- List of educational institutions in Bahrain
