= Arig =

Reinsurance company based in Bahrain

Arab Insurance Group B.S.C..

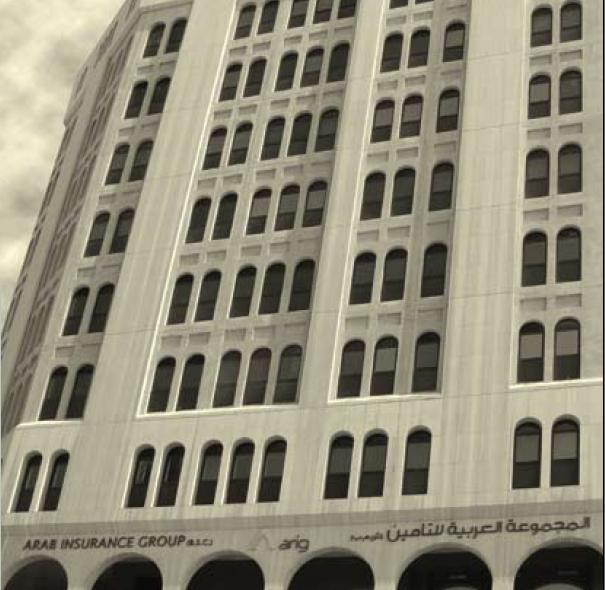
- Company type: Principal
- Industry: Re-Insurance
- Founded: 1980
- Headquarters: Bahrain
- Area served: MENA, Middle east & Far east
- Products: Insurance & Re-Insurance
- Website: arig.net

Arig (Arab Re-Insurance Group) was founded in 1980, Established by the governments of Kuwait, Libya and the United Arab Emirates, is the largest Arab owned re-insurer. Arig is listed on the stock exchanges in Bahrain, Dubai and Kuwait and held by nearly 5000 individual share holders.
