= Fareej el-Hammam =

Map of Manama in 1926.

Fareej el-Hammam (Arabic: فريج الحمام, Fareej el-Hammam), also called Fareej el-Khawaja after a prominent family, is an old district close to the Manama Souq in the heart of Manama, in the Kingdom of Bahrain. It is adjacent to Fareej el-Makharqa. Along with the other districts of the souq, it formed the core districts of Manama prior to the expansion of the city in the 20th century.

Many famous Matams are located in the district, including Matam Algassab and Matam Al-Hahj Abbas (Matam Haji Abbas).

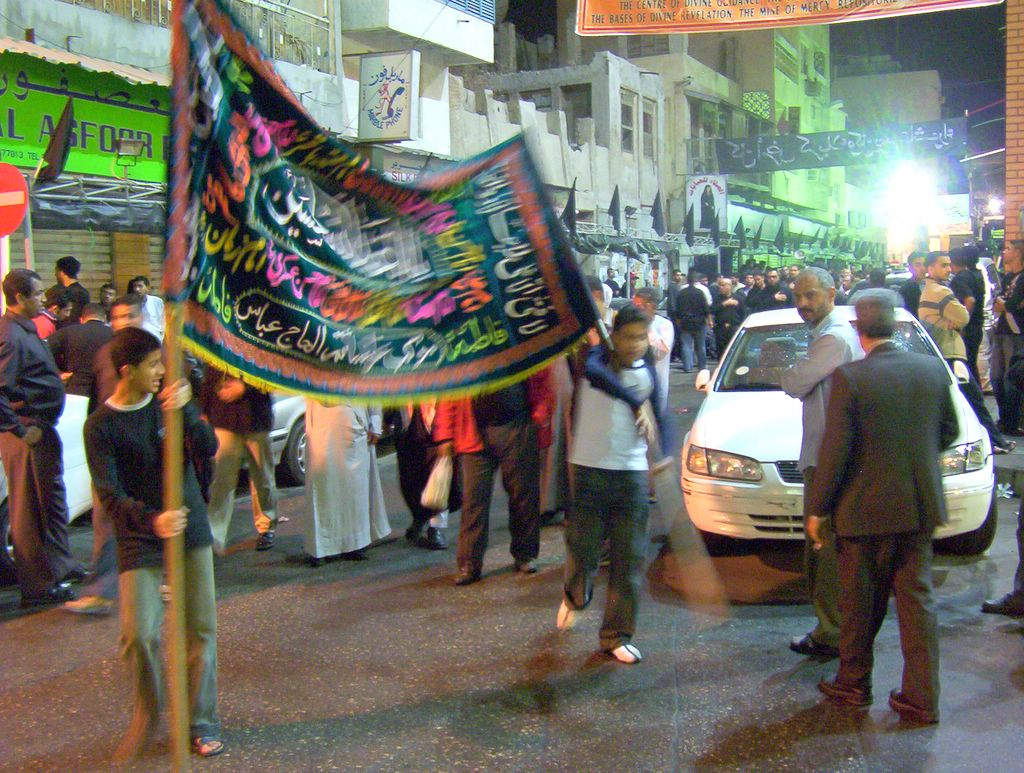
Procession in the district, organized by Matam Al-Haji Abbas
