= Ras Rumman =

Ras Rumman رأس الرمان
- Village
- Location in Bahrain
- Coordinates: 26°14′13″N 50°35′6″E
- Country: Bahrain
- Governorate: Capital Governorate

Ras Rumman (Arabic: رأس الرمان) is a neighborhood of Manama in Bahrain.

== Etymology ==
Map of Manama in 1926.

The name Ras Rumman translates to "head of pomegrante" in Arabic. This name derives from the historically large fields starting at Ras Rumman and ending near Budaiya.

== History ==
Historically it was a separate village of its own, however with the expansion of Manama, it became incorporated into the capital city as one of its neighbourhoods as the city began unprecedented urbanization in the 20th century.

It lies to the east of the Manama Souq and roughly south of the Diplomatic Area. It has traditionally had an identity with a tradition of Pomegranate cultivation. The area was also the site of the British Overseas Airways Corporation in the 1930s.

== Notable buildings ==
The British Embassy of Bahrain is located in Ras Rumman. It also contains the Ras Rumman Mosque.
