= Capital Governorate, Bahrain =

Governorate of Bahrain

Coordinates: 26°14′10″N 50°34′59″E

Capital Governorate محافظة العاصمة Muḥāfaẓat al-ʿĀṣimah
- Governorate
- Flag

- Map of Bahrain showing Capital Governorate
- Country: Bahrain

Government
  - Governor: Khalid bin Humood bin Abdullah Al Khalifa

Area
  - Land: 78.71 km^{2} (30.39 sq mi)

Population (2020 Census)
  - Total: 548,345
  - Density: 6,967/km^{2} (18,040/sq mi)
- Time zone: UTC+3 (Arabia Standard Time)
- Website: www.capital.gov.bh

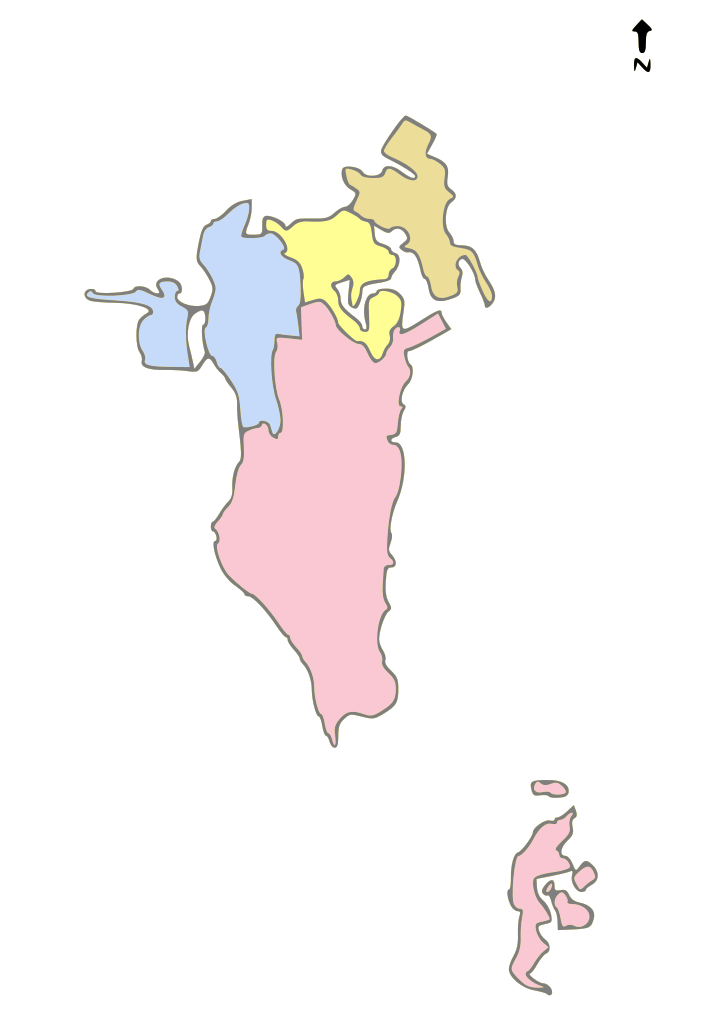
Governorates of Bahrain

The Capital Governorate (Arabic: محافظة العاصمة, romanized: Muḥāfaẓat al-ʿĀṣimah) is one of the four governorates of Bahrain. The governorate includes Manama, the capital of Bahrain. It is the most populous administrative region in the country, with a population of over half million people in 2020.

== Formation ==
The Capital Governorate was formed by royal decree on 3 July 2002. The present governorate incorporates the municipalities of Al Manamah, Jid Ali, Ras Rumman and parts of Jidd Haffs.

== Boundary Changes ==
In 2014, the boundaries of the governorates were redrawn in order to redraw the boundaries of electoral constituencies. Prior to the reorganisation, Capital Governorate had 8 constituencies, but expanded to 10, taking some territory from the Central Governorate, which was abolished with this change, and Northern Governorate. In addition to this, the borders of the existing constituencies changed, which altered the demographics of the voters within them.

== Demographics ==
According to a census conducted in 2010, there are 329,510 people living in the Capital Governorate, which is the highest of the four governorates; 261,921 non-Bahraini citizens and 67,589 Bahraini nationals. The vast majority of housing in the Capital Governorate are flats, with around 34,000 flats. Private villas were the second most-common form of housing, accounting for 7,284 of housing in the governorate.

As at the 2020 Census, the governorate's total population stands at 548,345 people in a land area of 78.71 km^{2}, with a population density of 6,967 per km^{2}.

== Governance ==
The first governor of the governorate was appointed in 1997, according to Decree No. (7), after the formation of the governorate according to Decree Law No. 16 in 1996. Governors are appointed by the Prime Minister of Bahrain. The previous governors were as follows:

- Shaikh Abdul Aziz bin Abdullah bin Atiyat Allah bin Al Rahman al Khalifa (1997–2002)
- Shaikh Hamoud bin Abdullah bin Hamad Al Khalifa (2002–2011)
- Shaikh Hisham bin Abdul Rahman bin Mohammed Al Khalifa (2011–2022)

The current governor is Shaikh Rashid bin Abdulrahman bin Rashid Al Khalifa, who was appointed on 25 May 2022.
