= Abu Baham =

Village in Northern Governorate, Bahrain

Coordinates: 26°12′N 50°33′E

Abu Baham (Arabic: أبو بهام) is a small village situated in the northern region of the Kingdom of Bahrain, on the western outskirts of the capital city Manama. The village lies under the Northern Governorate administrative region. The village lies directly south of Al Musalla, west of the village of Khamis and east of Sehla.

Notable places in the area include the Khamis Mosque, Adhari Park and the Bahrain Fort.
