= List of mosques in Bahrain =

This is a list of mosques in Bahrain.

Name	Images	Location	Built (CE)	Remarks
Khamis Mosque		Khamis	692	Believed to be the first mosque in Bahrain
Mausoleum of Sa'sa'a ibn Sawhan		Askar	8th century	Contains a tomb attributed to Sa'sa'a ibn Sawhan, a companion of Ali ibn Abi Talib
Sayyid Hashim al-Tublani Mosque		Tubli	12th century	Entombs the remains of Sayyid Hashim al-Bahrani, a notable Shi'ite scholar
Al Darah Mosque		Bilad Al Qadeem, Manama	1741	
Nabih Saleh Mosque		Nabih Saleh	1923	Built around the shrine of Salih, a pious man who lived in the 14th century
Al Fateh Grand Mosque		Manama	1988	Largest mosque in Bahrain in terms of capacity
Beit al-Quran Mosque		Manama	1990	Mosque attached to the Beit al-Quran Islamic museum
Al Hasan Mosque		Busaiteen	2018	Its design is a combination of modern construction and traditional Islamic art and architecture. It has 12 domes, two minarets, and the biggest mihrab in Bahrain
Salman bin Hamad Mosque		Awali	2018	One of the Beautiful Mosque and Architecture Design
Ahmed Bin Salman Bin Khalid Al Khalifa Mosque		Riffa	2022	
Muhammad bin Salman Al Khalifa Mosque		Budaiya		
Isa bin Salman Al Khalifa Grand Mosque		Diyar Al Muharraq		
Rashid Abdulrahman al-Zayani Mosque		Galali		
Gudaibiya Mosque		Gudaibiya		
Ebrahim Khalil Kanoo Mosque		Gufool		
Yusuf bin Ahmed Kanoo Mosque		Hamad Town		
Abdulrahman Jasim Kanoo Mosque		Hamad Town		
Khalid bin Mohamed bin Salman Mosque		Hamala		
King Khalid Grand Mosque, Bahrain		Umm Al Hassam		

== See also ==
- Islam in Bahrain
- Lists of mosques
- Destruction of Shia mosques during the 2011 Bahraini uprising
