= Al Musalla =

Village in Northern Governorate, Bahrain

Coordinates: 26°13′N 50°32′E

Al Musalla (Arabic: المصلى) is a village situated in the northern region of the Kingdom of Bahrain, on the western outskirts of the capital city Manama. The villages lies under the Northern Governorate administrative region. The village lies west of the village of Tashan and Khamis, north of Sehla and south of Jidhafs.

The village is one of the most prominent villages in the country. As with most villages in the country, it was the site of clashes between anti-government protesters and police during the Bahrain uprising.
