= Mausoleum of Sa'sa'a ibn Sawhan =

Shrine of a companion of Ali ibn Abi Talib in Bahrain

- ضريح صعصعة بن صوحان
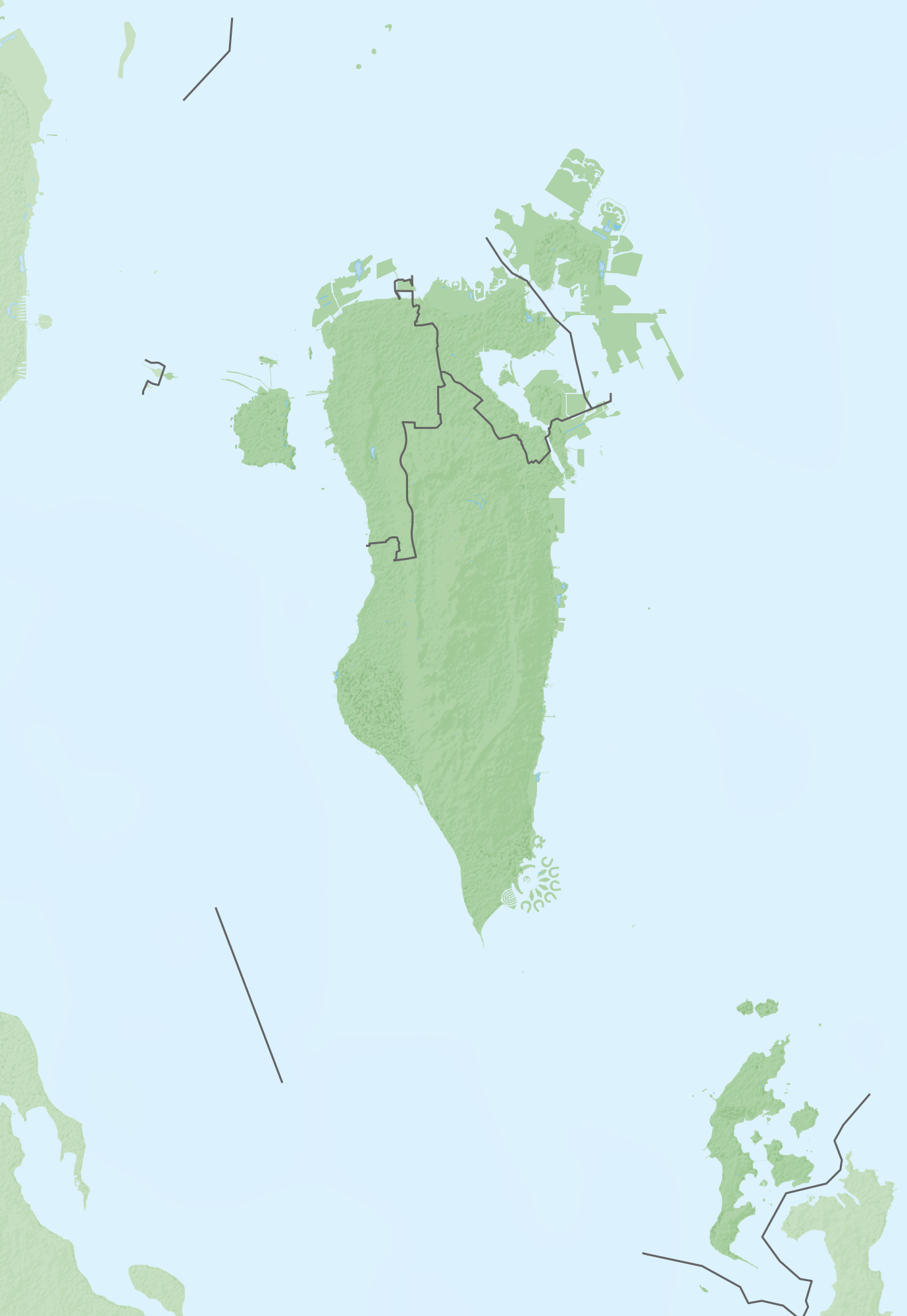
- Location of the mausoleum in Bahrain

Religion
- Affiliation: Shia (Twelver)
- Ecclesiastical or organizational status: Mausoleum
- Status: Closed to the public

Location
- Location: Askar
- Country: Bahrain
- Interactive map of Mausoleum of Sa'sa'a ibn Sawhan
- Coordinates: 26°03′24″N 50°37′06″E

Architecture
- Type: Islamic architecture
- Completed: 8th century CE
- Shrine: One: (Sa'sa'a ibn Sawhan)

The Mausoleum of Sa'sa'a ibn Sawhan (Arabic: ضريح صعصعة بن صوحان) is a mausoleum and shrine dedicated to Sa'sa'a ibn Sawhan, a companion of the fourth Rashidun Caliph, Ali ibn Abi Talib. It is located in southern Askar, Bahrain. The shrine is currently closed to the public and is in a dilapidated state.

== Controversy ==
It is disputed whether Sa'sa'a ibn Sawhan is actually buried in Askar. Ibn Hajar al-Asqalani mentions that he was buried in Kufa, where a mosque dedicated to him still stands. Sayyid Abdul-Jabbar al-Bahrani instead attributes his grave as being in Askar without any basis for his claims.

== Incidents ==
=== 2011 uprising ===
The mausoleum of Sa'sa'a ibn Sawhan was attacked during the uprising. The tomb was damaged badly and looted. The aluminum windows from the zarih around the grave were also removed as well. The incident was reported only a year later, in 2012, when the uprising had stopped.

=== 2016 vandalism ===
The mausoleum was vandalized heavily in 2016 and offensive remarks were spray painted on the walls of the building. Ever since then, the building was shut down by the government.

== See also ==
- List of mosques in Bahrain
- Shia in Bahrain
