= Al Darah Mosque =

Mosque in Bilad Al Qadeem, Manama, Bahrain

- مسجد الدارة
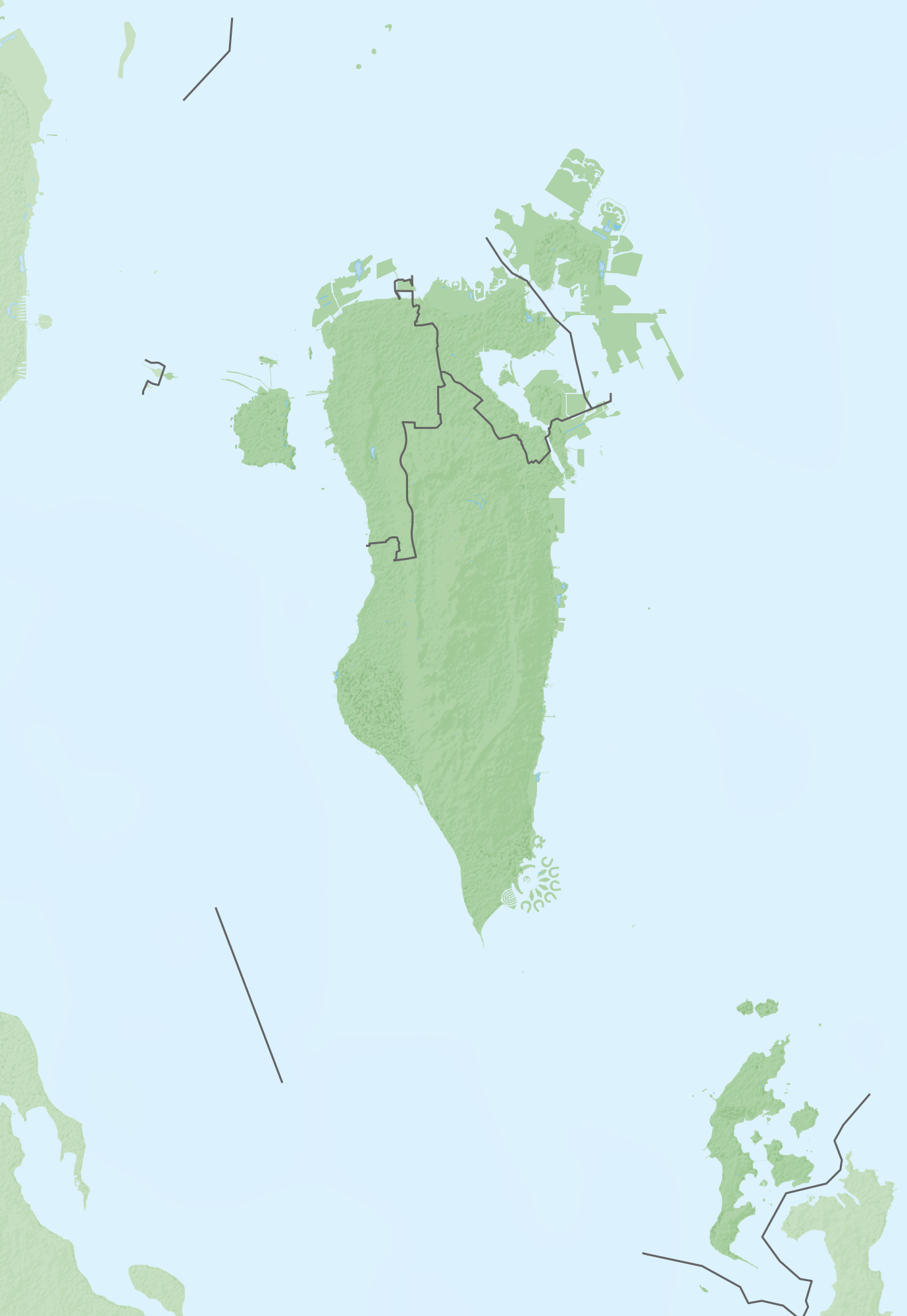
- Location of the mosque in Bahrain

Religion
- Affiliation: Shia Islam
- Ecclesiastical or organisational status: Mosque
- Status: Active

Location
- Location: Bilad Al Qadeem, Manama
- Country: Bahrain
- Interactive map of Al Darah Mosque
- Coordinates: 26°12′35″N 50°33′10″E

Architecture
- Type: Mosque
- Founder: Ali Al-Baladi Al-Bahrani
- Completed: 1741

The Al Darah Mosque (Arabic: مسجد الدارة) is considered one of the oldest mosques in the Bilad Al Qadeem, Manama, Bahrain. It is located east of the village in an earlier settlement and was founded by Shiite cleric Sheikh Ali Al-Baladi Al-Bahrani, buried in Abu Anbara Cemetery. The inscription marks it as built in 1741.

The mosque, like most in the village, is on foundations that rise above the since-eroded ground level.

== See also ==
- Shia in Bahrain
- List of mosques in Bahrain
