= KHR Arkitekter =

KHR Architecture AS
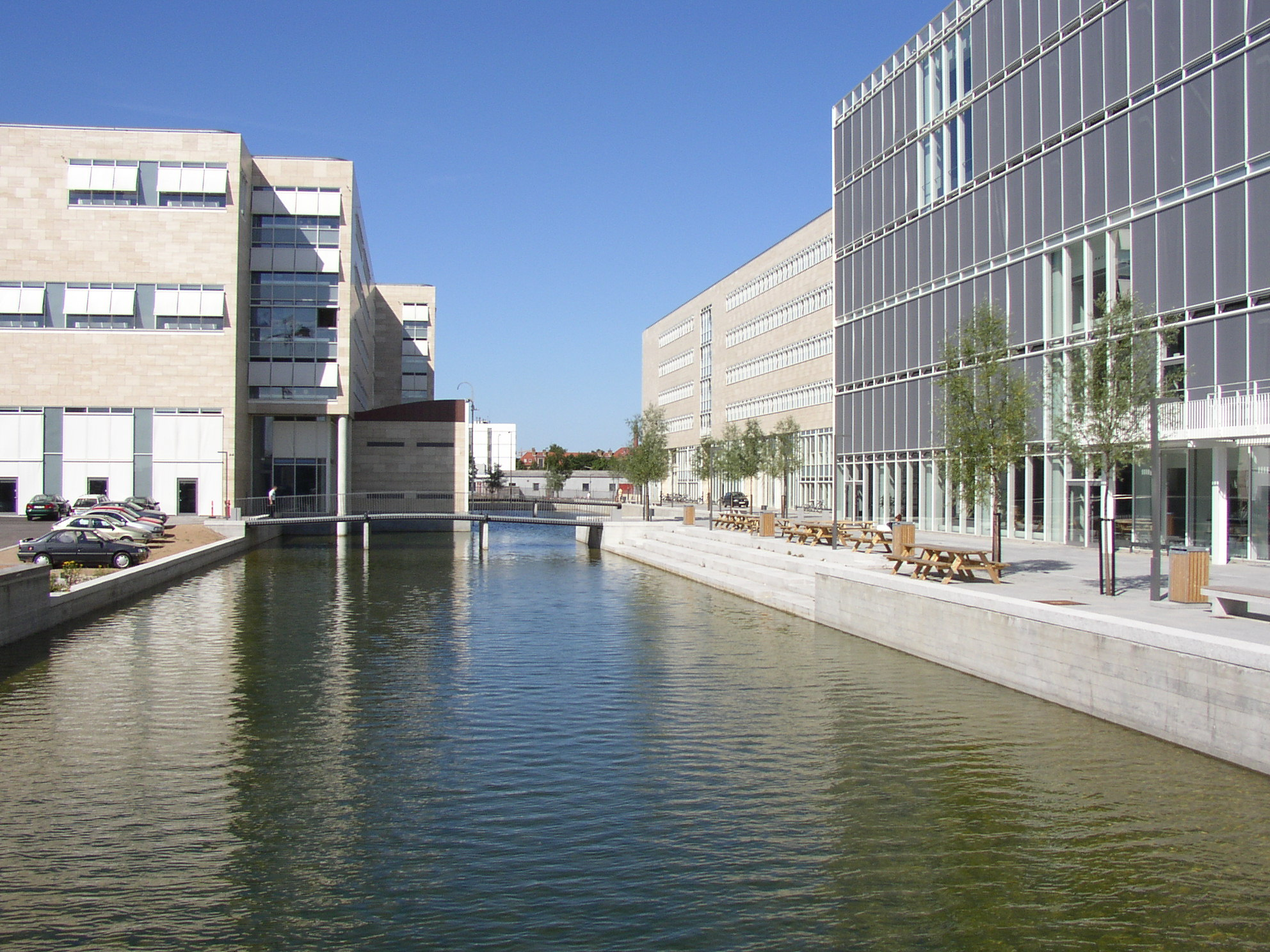
- Faculty of Humanities

Practice information
- Key architects: Janina Zerbe; Mikkel Beedholm; Torben Juul; Morten Nøhr Frandsen; Kristian Kjær Nielsen
- Founded: 1946
- Location: Copenhagen

Significant works and honors
- Buildings: Copenhagen Airport; Stockholm-Arlanda Airport; Bahrain National Museum; University of Copenhagen Faculty of Humanities; St. Olavs University Hospital
- Projects: Ørestad; Copenhagen Metro
- Awards: Nykredit Architecture Prize (1992)

KHR Architecture A/S, formerly known as KHRAS and KHR Arkitekter is a Danish architecture company founded as Krohn & Hartvig Rasmussen in 1946. The company was founded by Gunnar Krohn and E. Hartvig Rasmussen after winning an architectural competition for the machine factory Atlas.

During the 1960s, the company started focusing on European styles applied to public buildings in Denmark. The company has around 100 employees and six partners involved in the daily management: Janina Zerbe, Henrik Richter Danielsen, Mikkel Beedholm, Lars Kragh And, Torben Juul and Peter Nielsen. Several works have been nominated for the European Union Prize for Contemporary Architecture and Mies van der Rohe Award. In 1992, the company was awarded the Nykredit Architecture Prize.

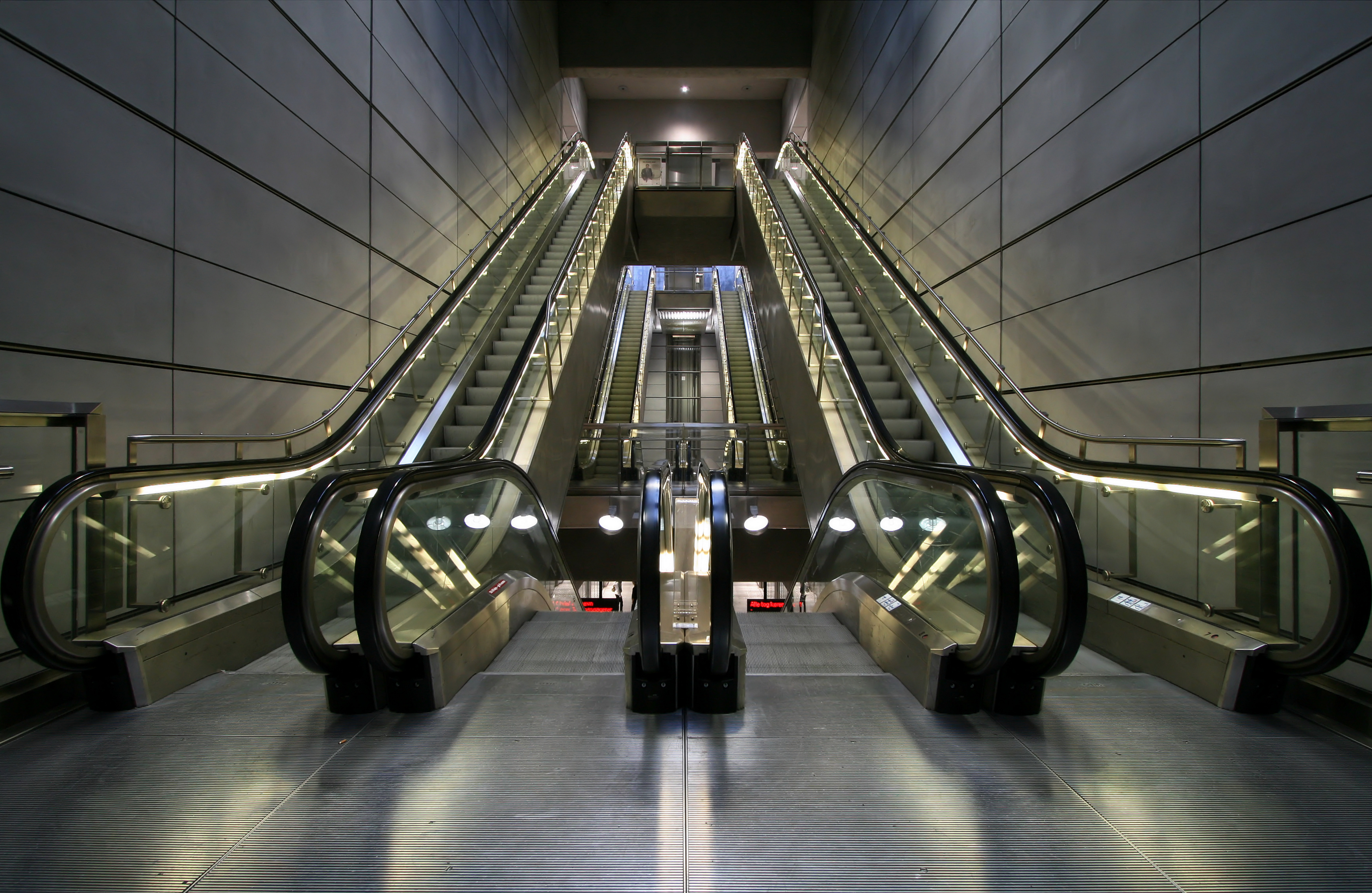
Escalators at Amagerbro Station of the Copenhagen Metro

Among the company's projects are Sct. Hans New Forensic Psychiatry (2021), Østerport 2 office building (2021), Copenhagen Airport (several terminals), Rødovre Centrum (1966), Hvidovre Hospital (1968), University of Southern Denmark (1970), Bahrain National Museum (1987), the Danish pavilion at Expo 92 (1992), Fonnesbæk Church (1992), Frederiskberg Centret (1996), Copenhagen Metro stations (1996), Billund Airport (1997), Bang & Olufsen head office (1998), Stockholm-Arlanda Airport (1999), University of Copenhagen Faculty of Humanities (2000), Forum Horsens (2002), St. Olavs University Hospital (2002), KMD head office (2002), Fiberline (2004), Haukeland University Hospital (2006), Biocenter (2007), Hillerød Town Hall (2008), Church of the Holy Cross (2008), Campus Rådmandsmarken of the Metropolitan University College (2008) and Hedorfs Kollegium (2009), Ørestad School and Library (2012), Amalie Skrams School and AdO Arena in Bergen (2014). Nyt SUND, Faculty of Health at the University of Southern Denmark in Odense (2023) and many more.
