= Zayd ibn Suhan =

Zayd ibn Suhan (Arabic: زيد بن صوحان) was a companion of the Islamic prophet Muhammad, and is revered by Shia Muslims. He was the brother of Sa'sa'a bin Sohan. He is mentioned in Sahih al-Bukhari. He was killed in the Battle of the Camel by Amr Al Yathribi.

Zayd originated from the city of Qatif, Saudi Arabia.

His grave and shrine lies in the village of Malkiya in Bahrain. He is sometimes referred to as "Ameer Zayd".
