= Al Hasan Mosque =

Mosque in Bahrain

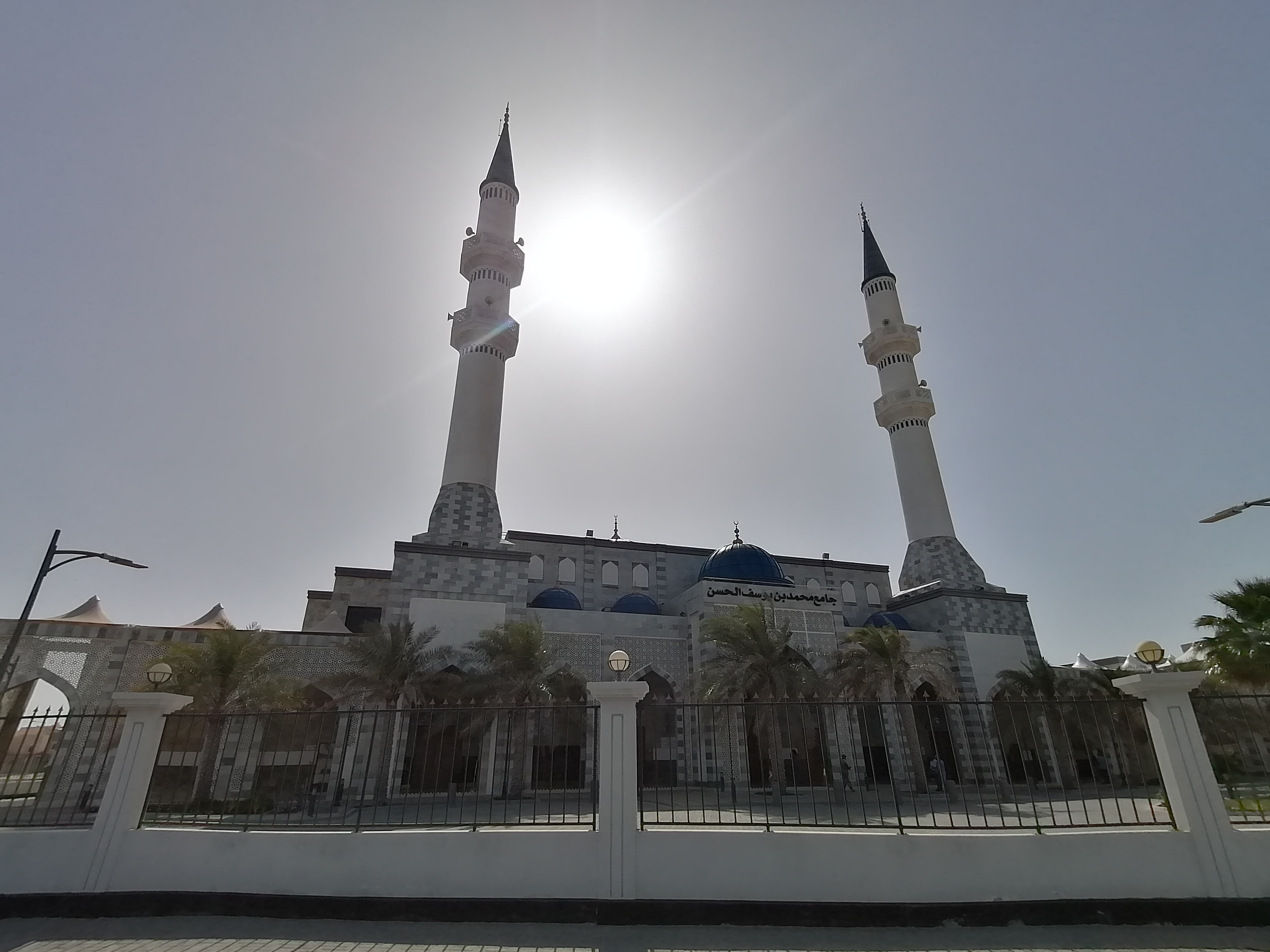
- The mosque in 2012

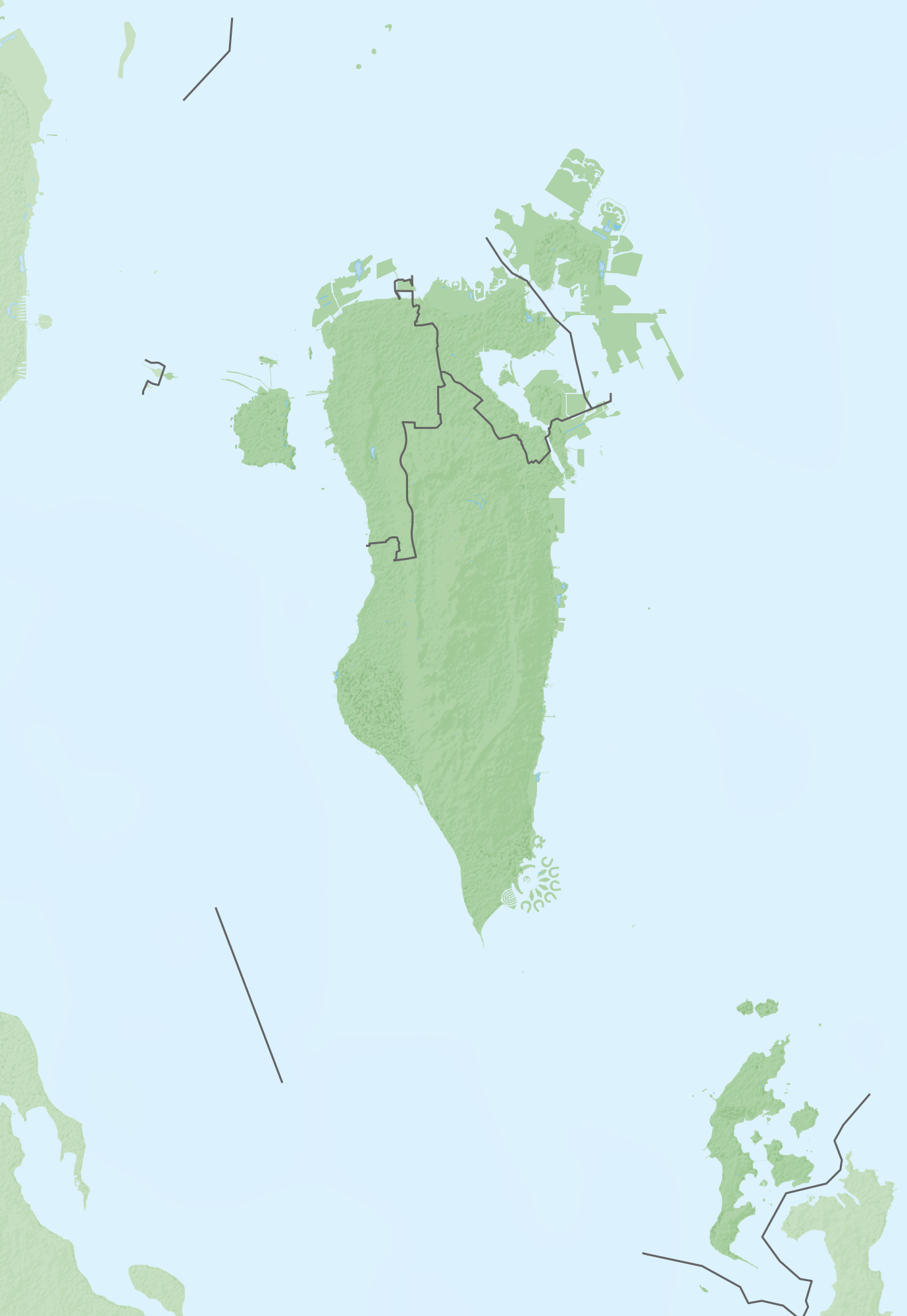
- Location of the mosque in Bahrain

Religion
- Affiliation: Islam
- Ecclesiastical or organisational status: Mosque
- Status: Active

Location
- Location: Busaiteen
- Country: Bahrain
- Interactive map of Al Hasan Mosque
- Coordinates: 26°16′34″N 50°35′57″E

Architecture
- Style: Islamic
- Founder: Mohamed bin Yusuf Al-Hasan
- Completed: 2018

Specifications
- Capacity: 2,000 worshippers
- Dome: 12
- Dome dia. (outer): 10.5 m (34 ft)
- Minaret: 2
- Minaret height: 55 m (180 ft)
- Site area: 9,400 m^{2} (101,000 sq ft)
- Materials: Teak wood; fiberglass

Website
- alhasanmosque.com

The Al-Hasan Mosque is a mosque located in Busaiteen, Bahrain. Built by Mohamed bin Yusuf Al-Hasan, the mosque has 12 domes, two minarets, and the biggest mihrab in Bahrain, styled in a combination of ancient, traditional and modern Islamic art.

== Structure ==
The mosque was designed by Turkish architects and completed in 2018. The two conical Ottoman style minarets are 55 metres (180 ft) tall so as to be visible from a distance. There are twelve domes; and the main dome is surrounded by four medium-sized domes and below them are seven smaller domes. The fiberglass domes were all made in the UAE. The doors were made in India of teak wood. The carpet and 21 chandeliers were made in Turkey.

The mosque includes two prayer halls, a Qur'an center, two function halls, a media center and housing for the imam, the muadhin, cleaners and workers. It can accommodate 2,000 worshippers in the prayer halls and in the porticos. The mihrab (prayer niche) is in the Egyptian style and was made by Egyptian engineers and specialists.

Besides being a place of worship, the mosque started tours for people of all faiths in January 2022.

== Gallery ==
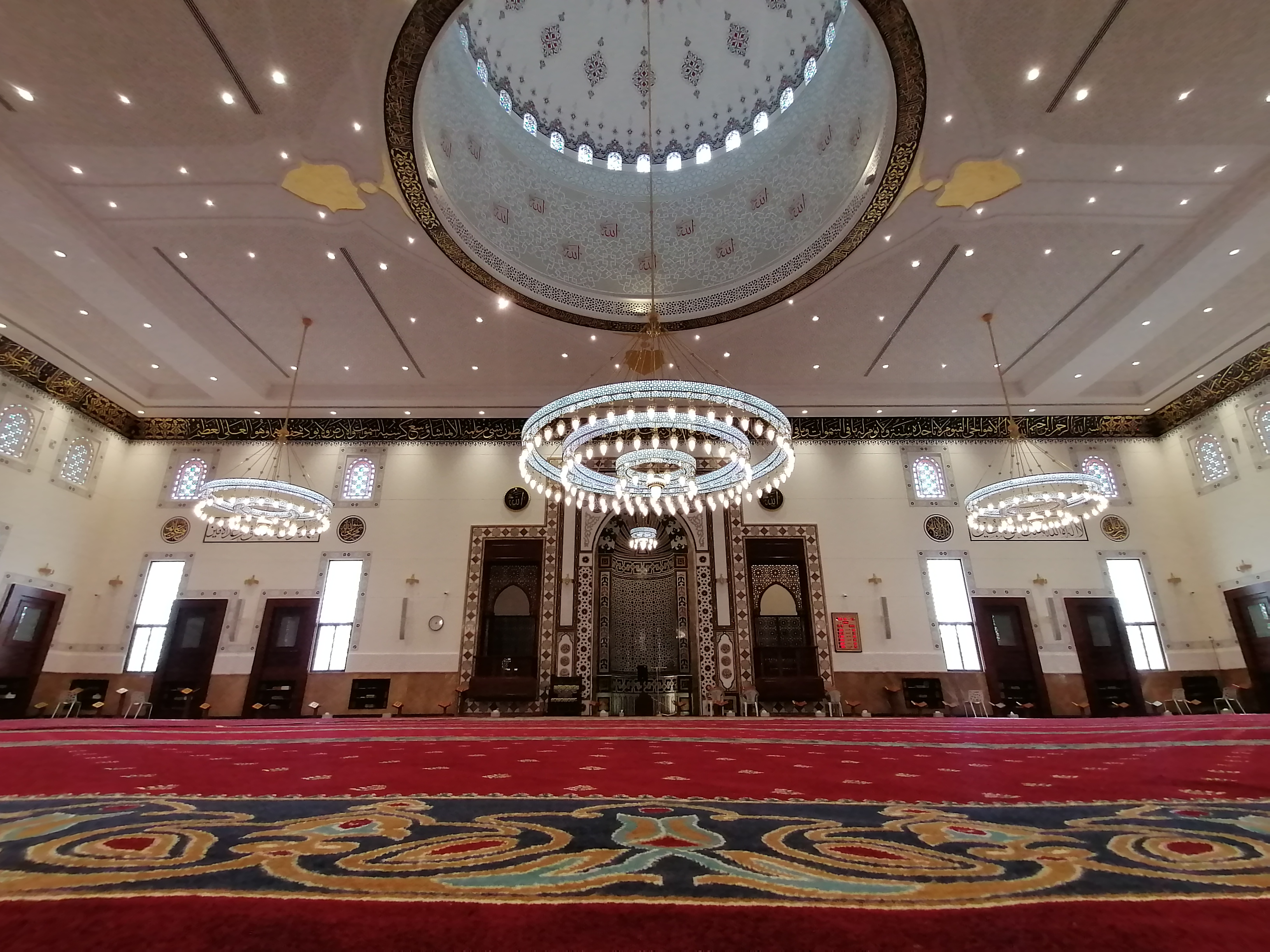
Al Hasan Mosque interior

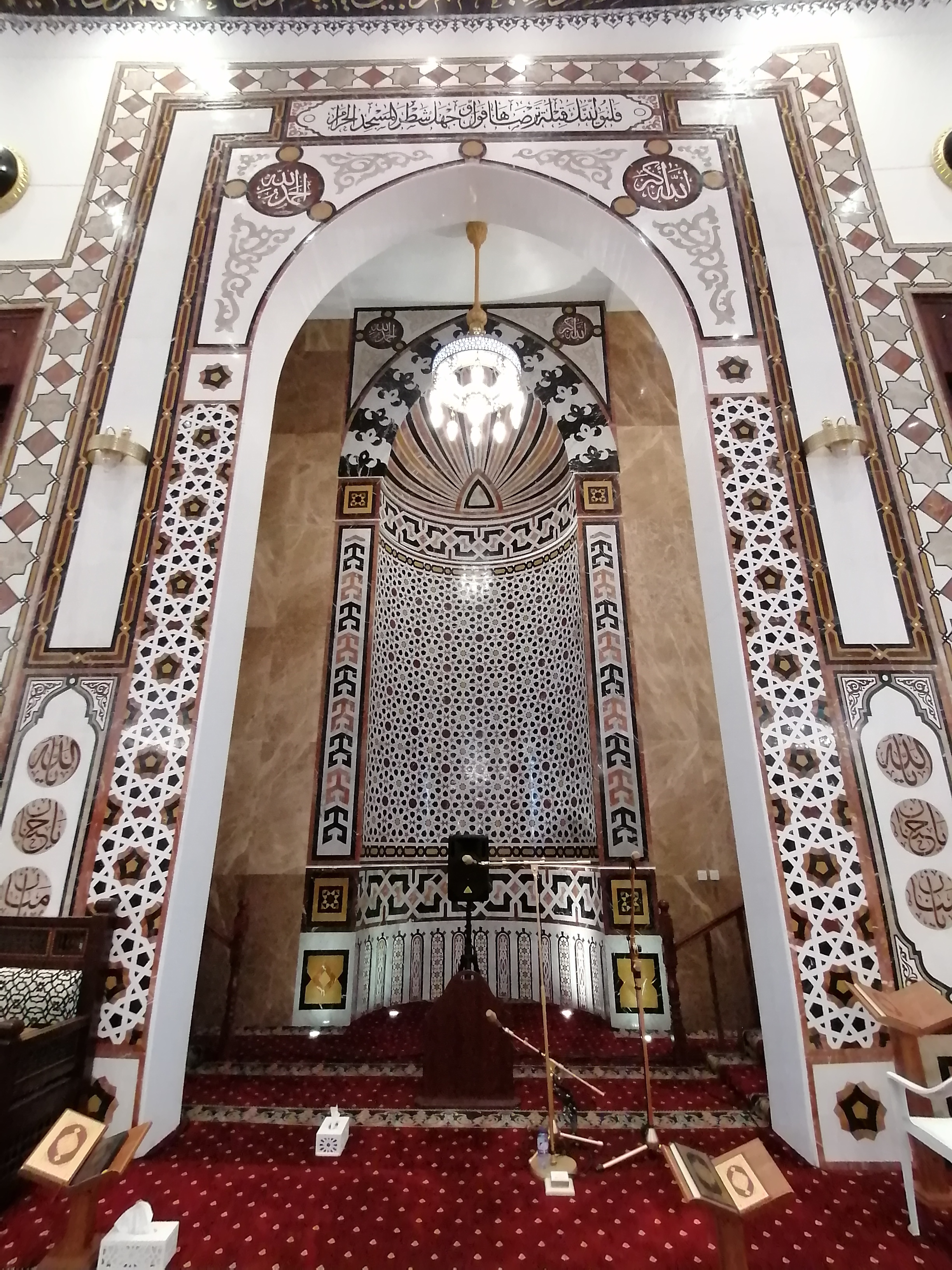
Al Hasan Mosque interior mihrab

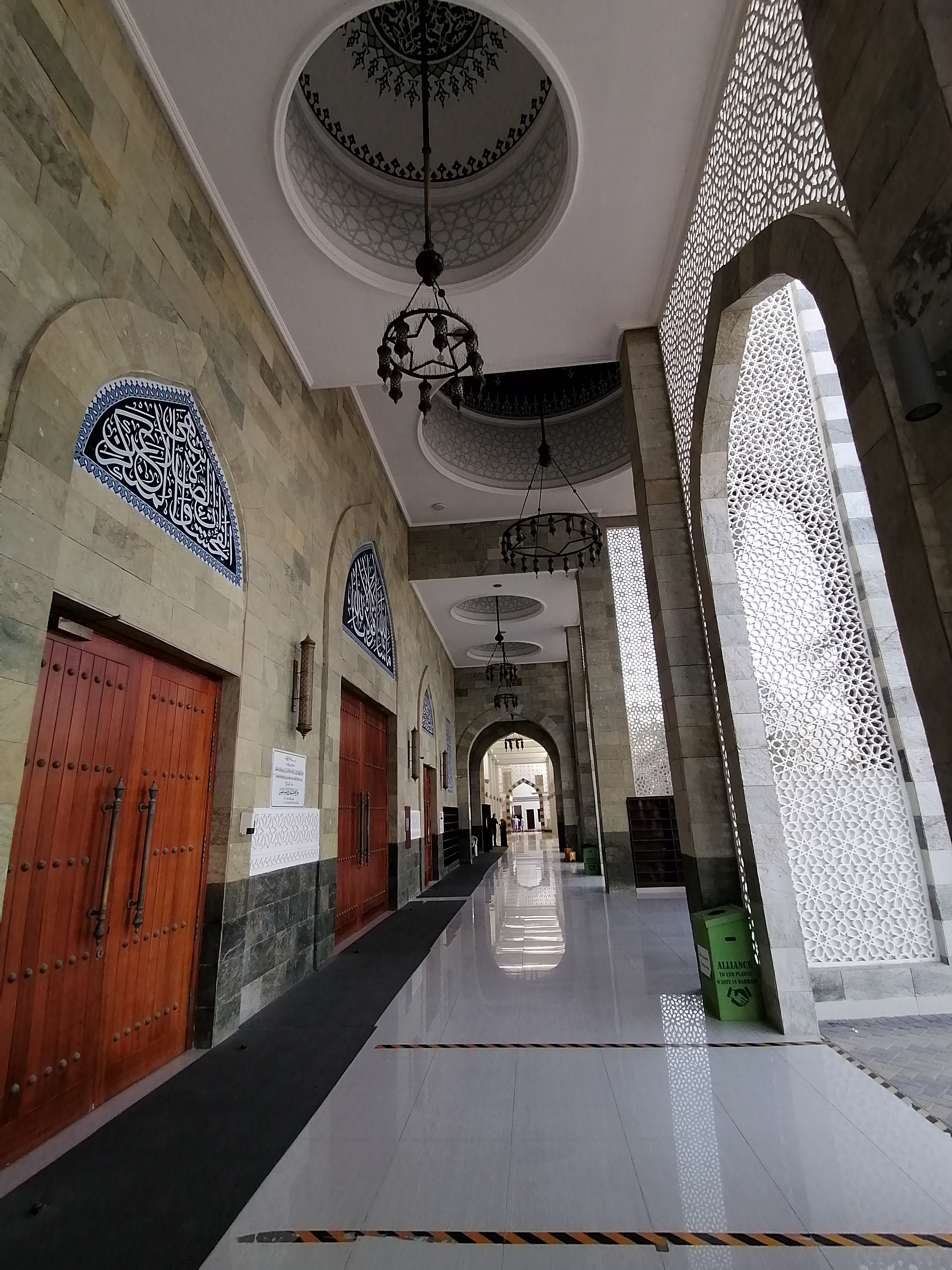
Al Hasan Mosque teak wood doors

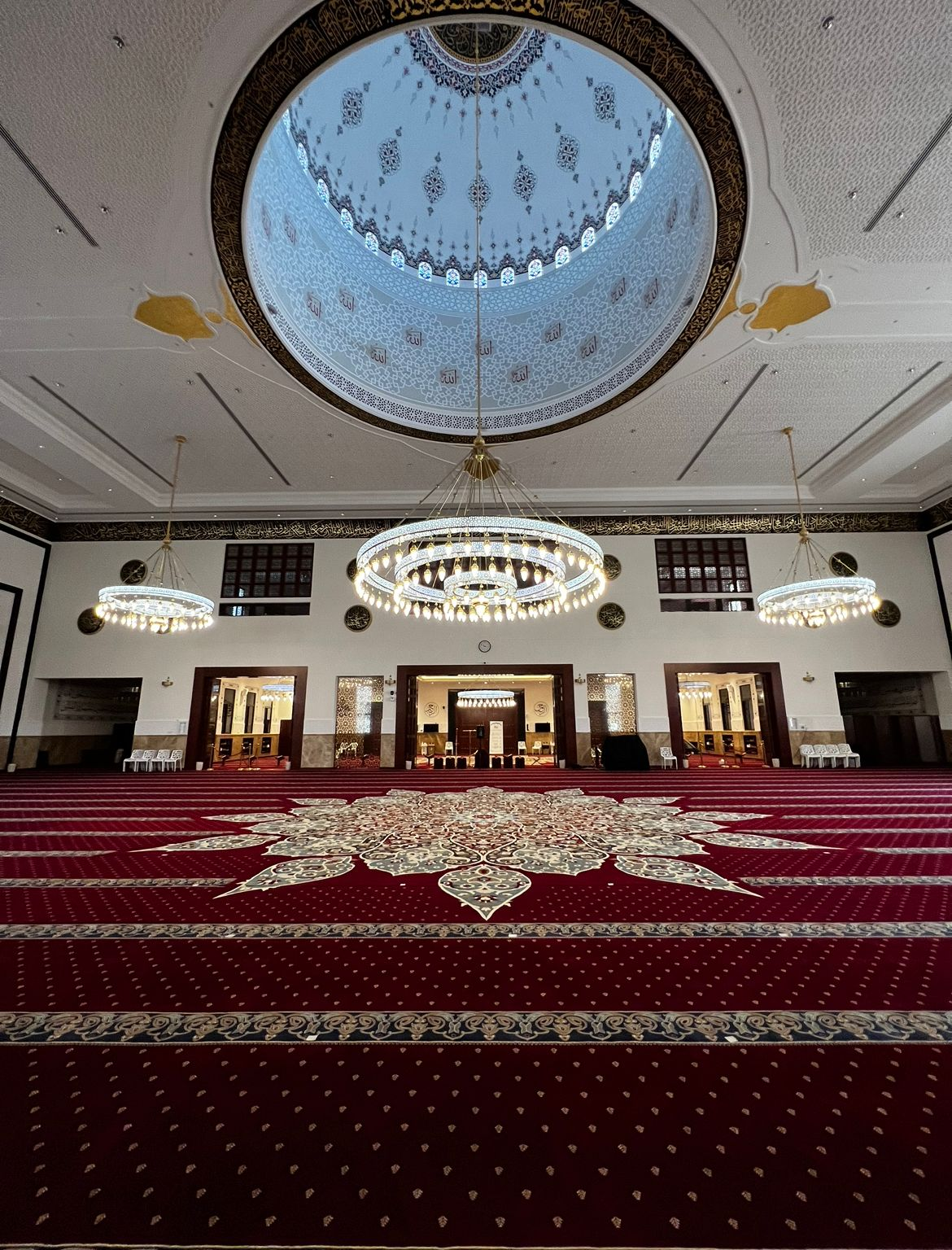

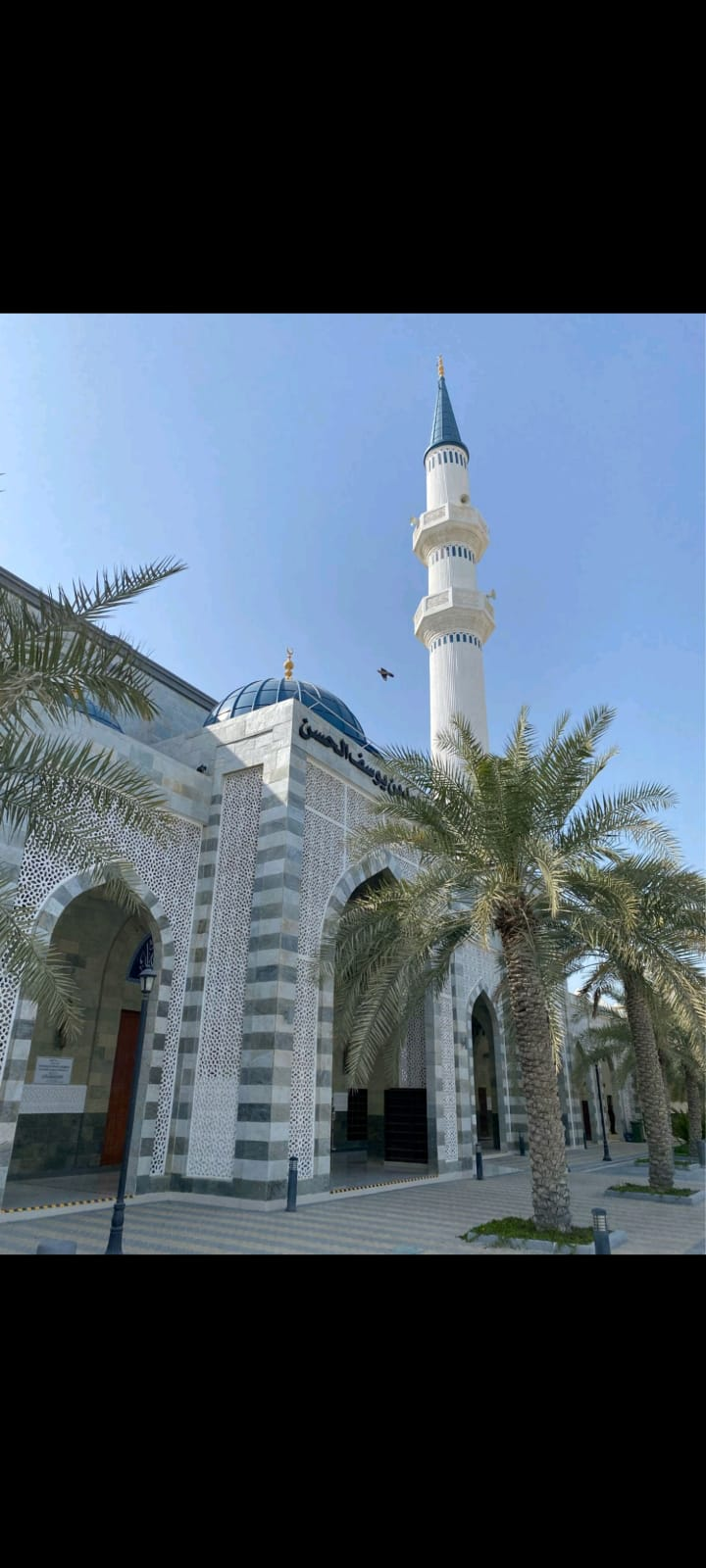

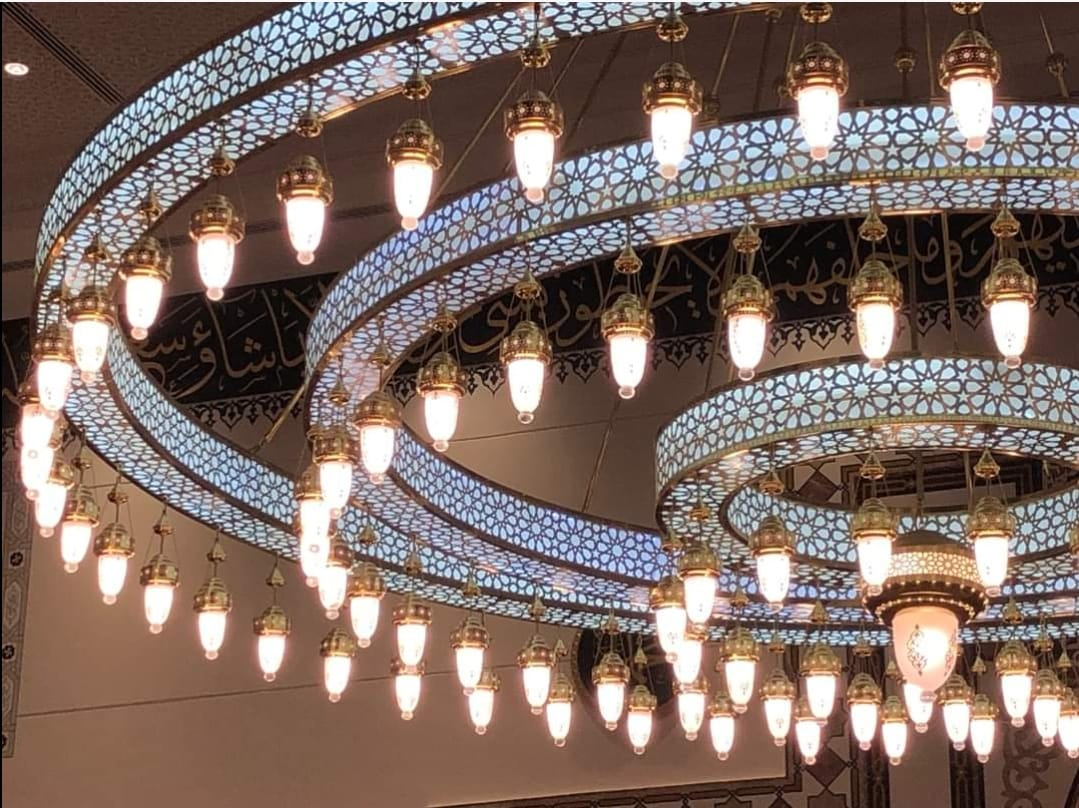

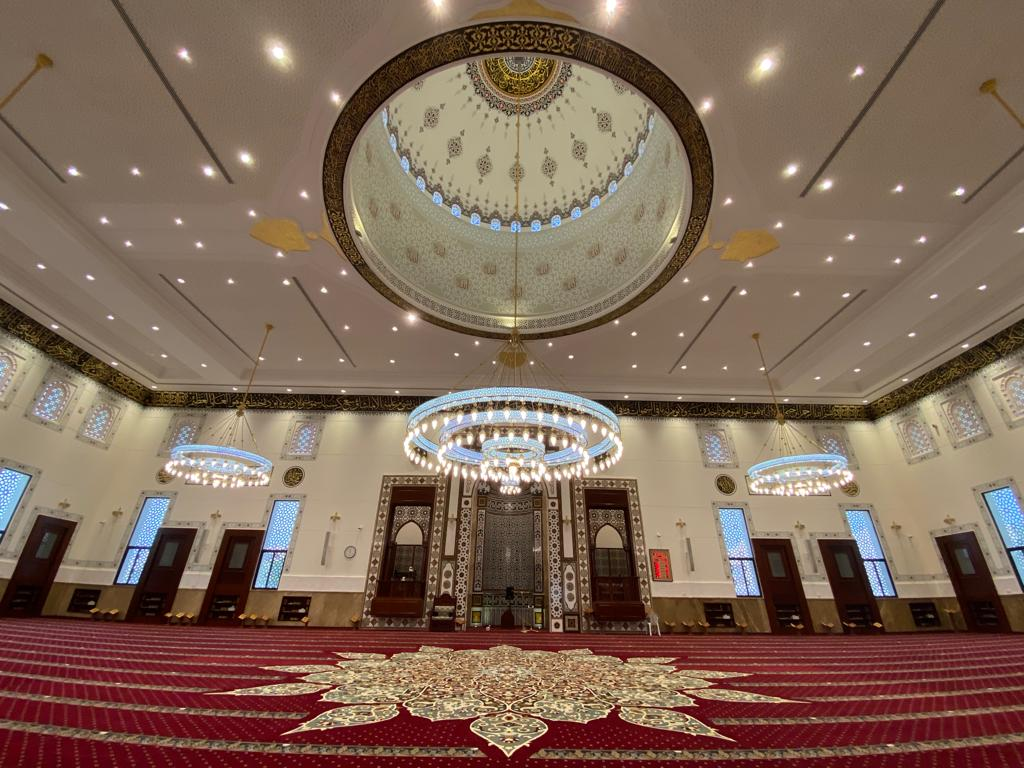

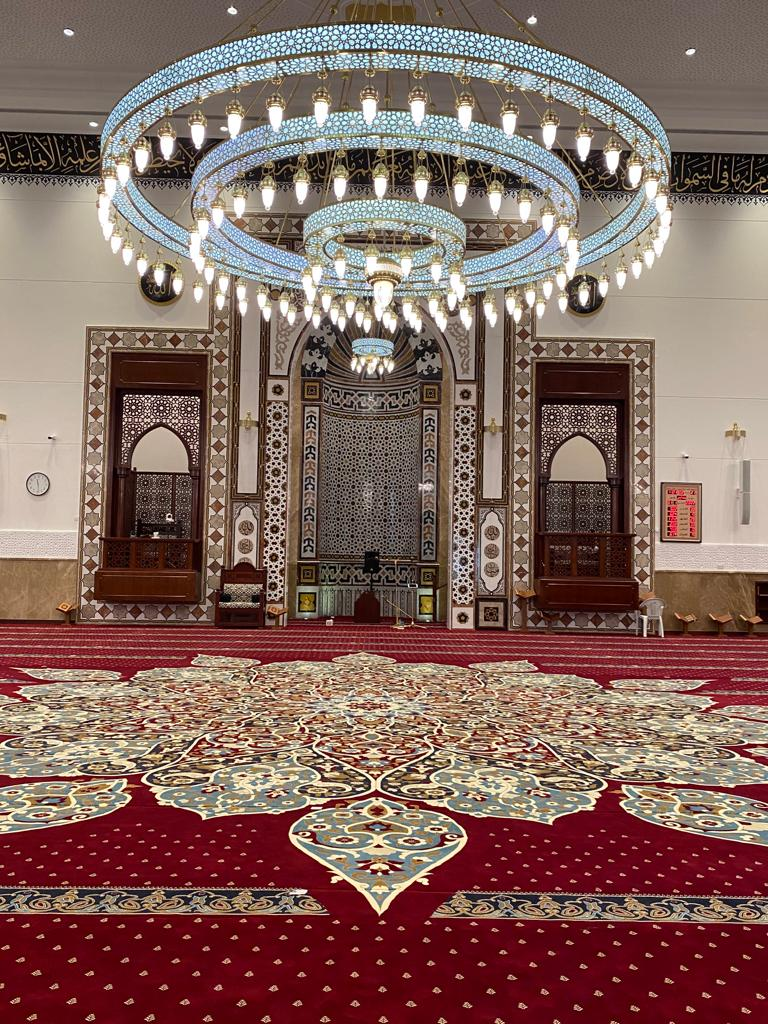

== See also ==
- List of mosques in Bahrain
- Islam in Bahrain
