= Bahrain National Museum =

Public museum in Bahrain

- متحف البحرين الوطني
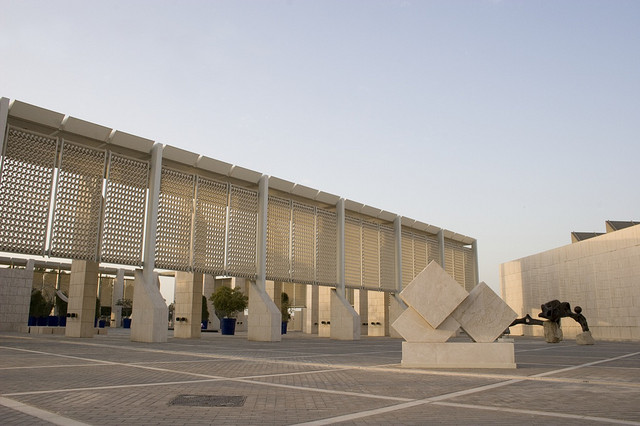
- Bahrain National Museum

- Location within Bahrain
- Established: 15 December 1988; 37 years ago
- Location: Manama, Bahrain
- Coordinates: 26°14′26″N 50°35′54″E
- Type: Public
- Collection size: Dilmun artifacts
- Director: Khalifa bin Ahmed Al Khalifa
- Curators: Pierre Lombard, Nadine Boskmati-Fattouh
- Parking: Free on-site
- Website: Government site

The Bahrain National Museum (Arabic: متحف البحرين الوطني, romanized: Matḥaf al-Baḥrayn al-Waṭanī) is the largest public museum in Bahrain and is the oldest national museum in the Persian Gulf. It is situated in Manama, adjacent to the National Theatre of Bahrain. Opened on 15 December 1988 by the Emir of Bahrain Isa bin Salman Al Khalifa, the $30 million museum complex covers 27,800 sq meters and is the country's most popular tourist attraction. It is widely considered to be the region's first modern museum.

== History ==
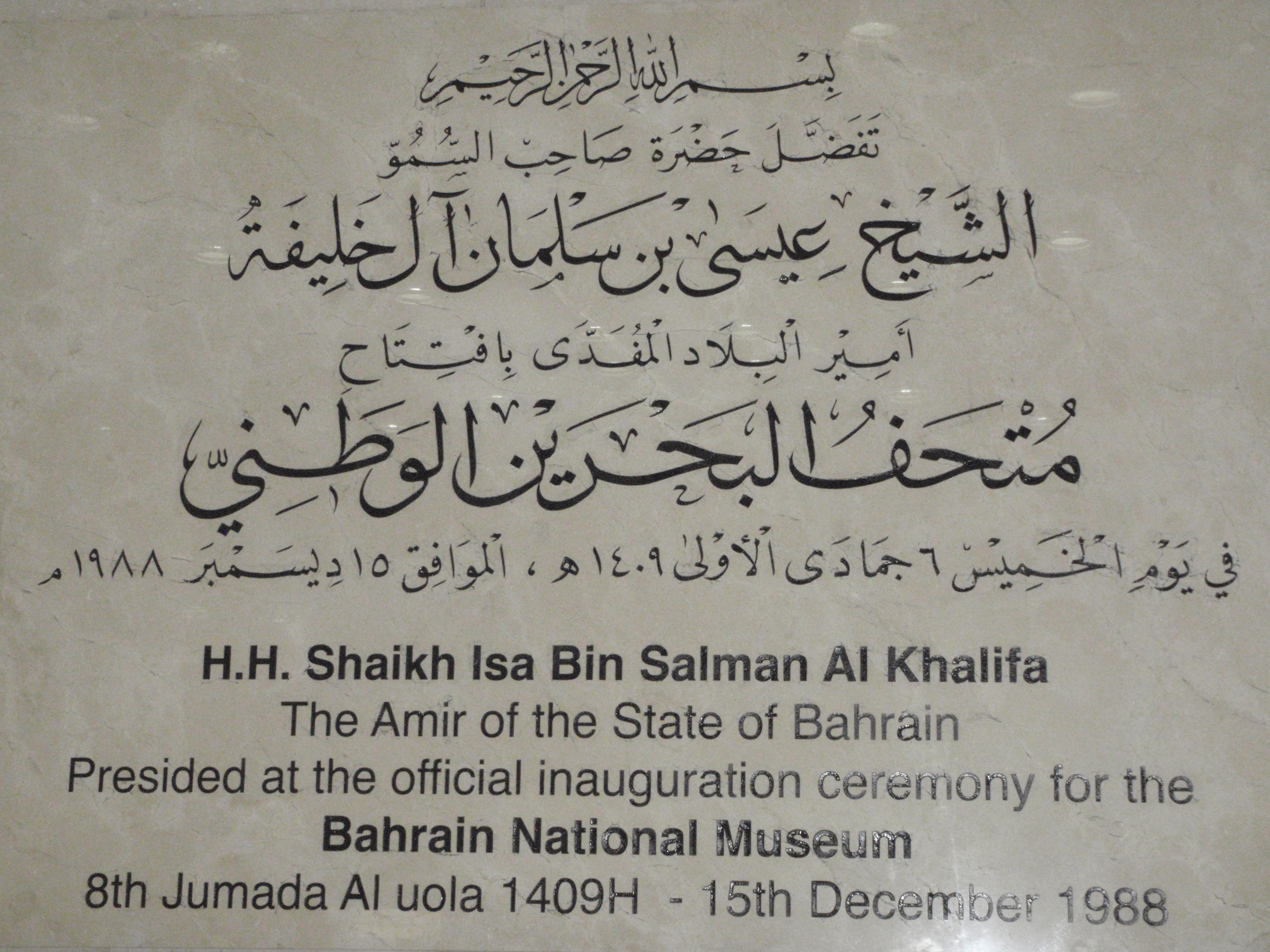
Commemorative plaque of the museum's inauguration

In 1957, the first exhibition of archaeological artifacts in Bahrain occurred at the Hidaya Boys School in collaboration with the Danish Archaeological Expedition sent to the Bahrain Fort. The temporary exhibition lasted for a few days but drew significant interest in archaeology from the Bahraini community. In 1967, a cultural agreement was signed between UNESCO and the Bahraini government which helped pave the way for the construction of a national museum. A national museum was first opened at Government House in Manama on 4 March 1970 by the head of state council at the time, Khalifa bin Salman Al Khalifa.

The modern museum was designed by Danish architects Krohn & Hartvig Rasmussen and officially opened in December 1988. It was constructed on an artificial peninsula overlooking the neighbouring island of Muharraq. The museum is made of two buildings spanning a floor space of 20,000 square meters. The complex contains six permanent exhibitions, an educational hall, a gift shop and a cafeteria, in addition to administrative offices, laboratories and warehouses for the Conservation of holdings and parking. The museum celebrated its 25th anniversary in 2013 by renovating the Hall of Dilmun Graves, and hosting an international conference on museum development.

== Collections ==
The museum possess a collection of Bahrain's ancient archaeological artifacts acquired since 1988, and covering around 5000 years of Bahrain's history. The complex includes three halls devoted to archaeology and the ancient civilisation of the Dilmun, while two other halls depict the culture and lifestyle of Bahrain's recent pre-industrial past. In 1993, a further hall was opened, the Natural History Hall, focusing on the natural environment of Bahrain. This hall features specimens of Bahrain's flora and fauna.

=== Hall of Dilmun ===
The exhibit focuses on artifacts and the history of the Dilmun civilization from 5000 BC to 400 BC, including its widespread trading network with Mesopotamia and the Indus Valley. On display are Dilmunite stamp seals, artifacts from Barbar temple and Saar Temple, and Dilmunite pottery. A notable exhibit is the Durand Stone, a long black basalt sculpture dating back to the Babylonian era. Another feature is a tableau which depicts a scene from the Epic of Gilgamesh (in which reference to Bahrain is made as the paradise of Dilmun).

=== Hall of Dilmun Graves ===
The exhibit focuses on burial practices of the Dilmun civilization and features an actual burial mound which was transported from its site A'ali and reassembled within the museum. The hall was closed for renovation in 2013 and re-opened to the public on 26 June 2018. Re-designed by French architect Didier Blin, the revamped hall features newly installed multimedia as well as findings from the most recent archaeological excavations. In 2019, the Dilmun Burial Mounds of Bahrain were recognized as a UNESCO World Heritage Site.

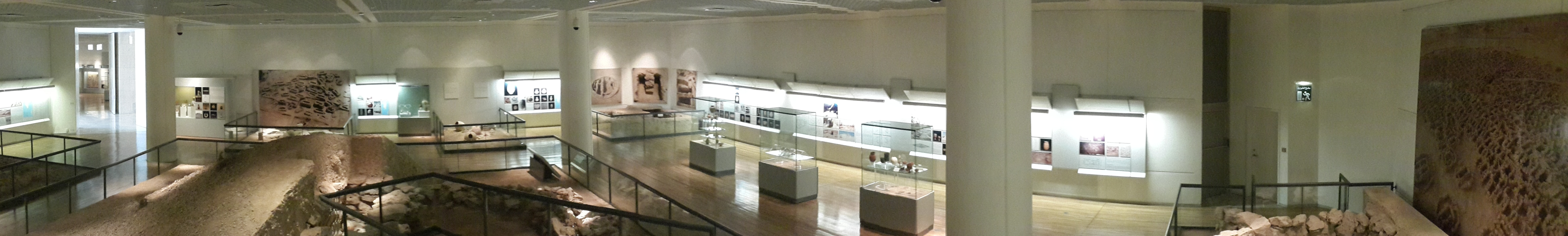
Panorama of the Hall of Graves exhibit prior to renovation

=== Hall of Tylos and Islam ===
The hall covers the Hellenic-influenced history of Bahrain from the 2nd century BC onwards as well as interactions with the Seleucid Empire and Characene kingdom. This exhibit hosts glazed pottery and glasses, alabaster containers and jewelry dating from that era. The Islamic portion of the exhibit follows Bahrain's adoption of Islam in the 7th century AD until the 18th century. It features artifacts from the Khamis Mosque, the oldest mosque in Bahrain, as well as Kufic inscriptions, timber beams, ceramic and glass.

=== Hall of Documents and Manuscripts ===
Rare copies of the Qur'an dating back from the 13th and 14th centuries, notes on astronomy and historical documents and letters from the ruling Al Khalifa family are exhibited in the hall.

=== Hall of Customs and Traditions ===
This exhibit focuses on the customs and traditions of Bahrain prior to the discovery of oil in 1932 and its subsequent modernization. Aspects of everyday life such as childhood, marriage, fashion, local religious and medical practices, and the structure of a traditional Bahraini house are exhibited.

=== Hall of Traditional Trades and Crafts ===
Featuring a recreation of a traditional Bahraini souq, this exhibit showcases traditional craftsmen and includes a section on pearl diving, a key component of the country's pre-oil economy.

== Gallery ==
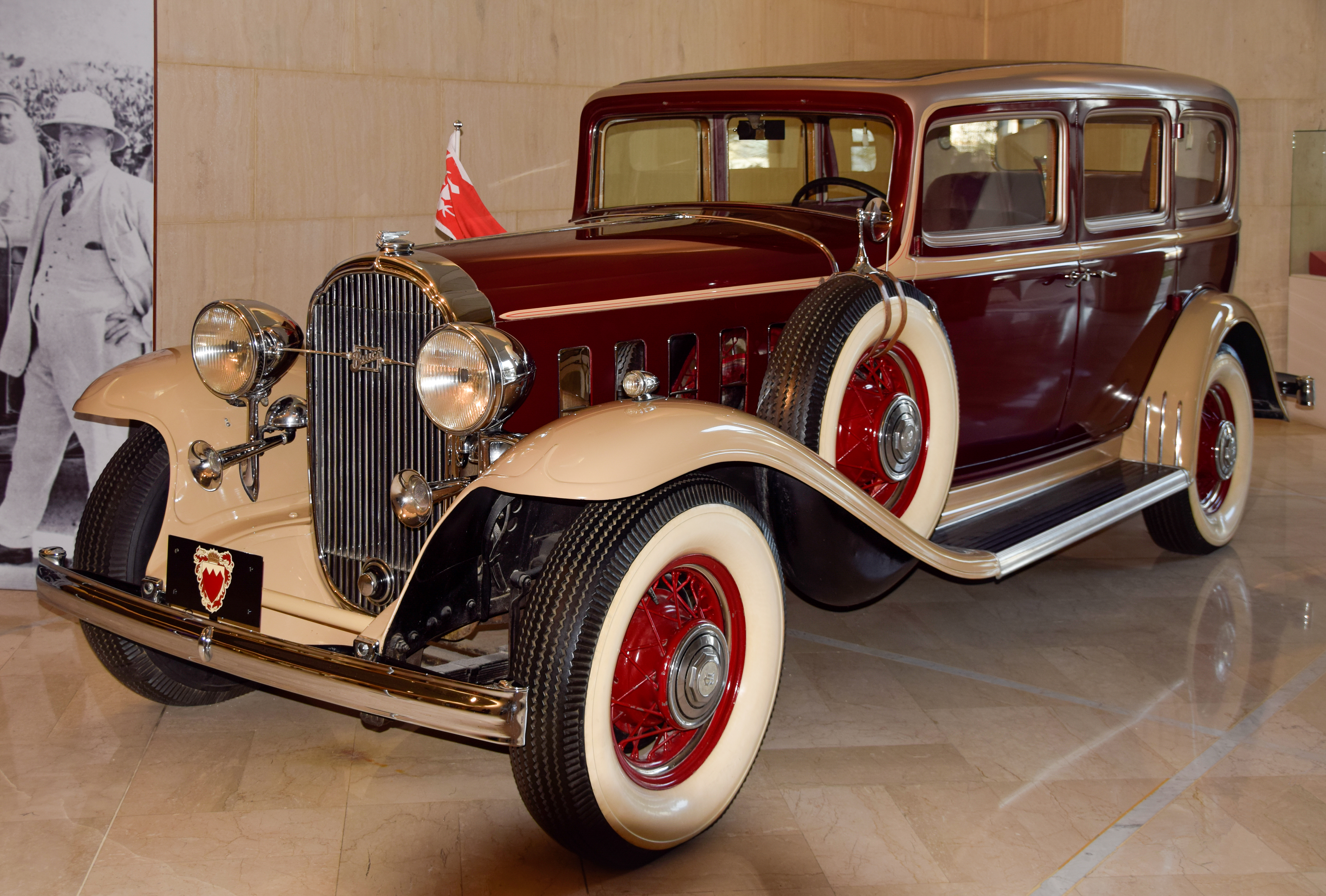
A restored 1932 Buick given to Isa bin Salman Al Khalifa by the American government. Donated to the Museum in 1992.

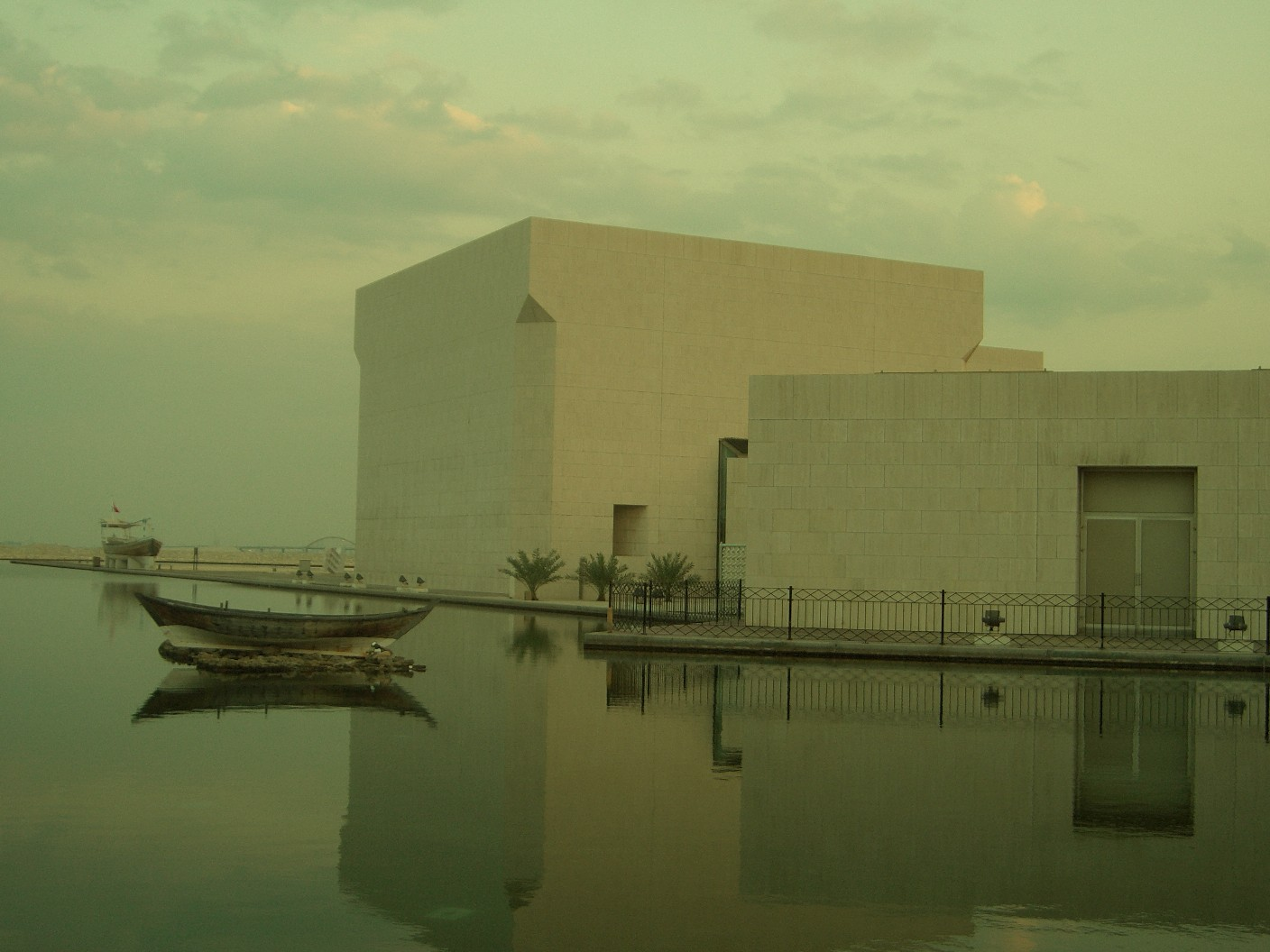
The museum's exterior.

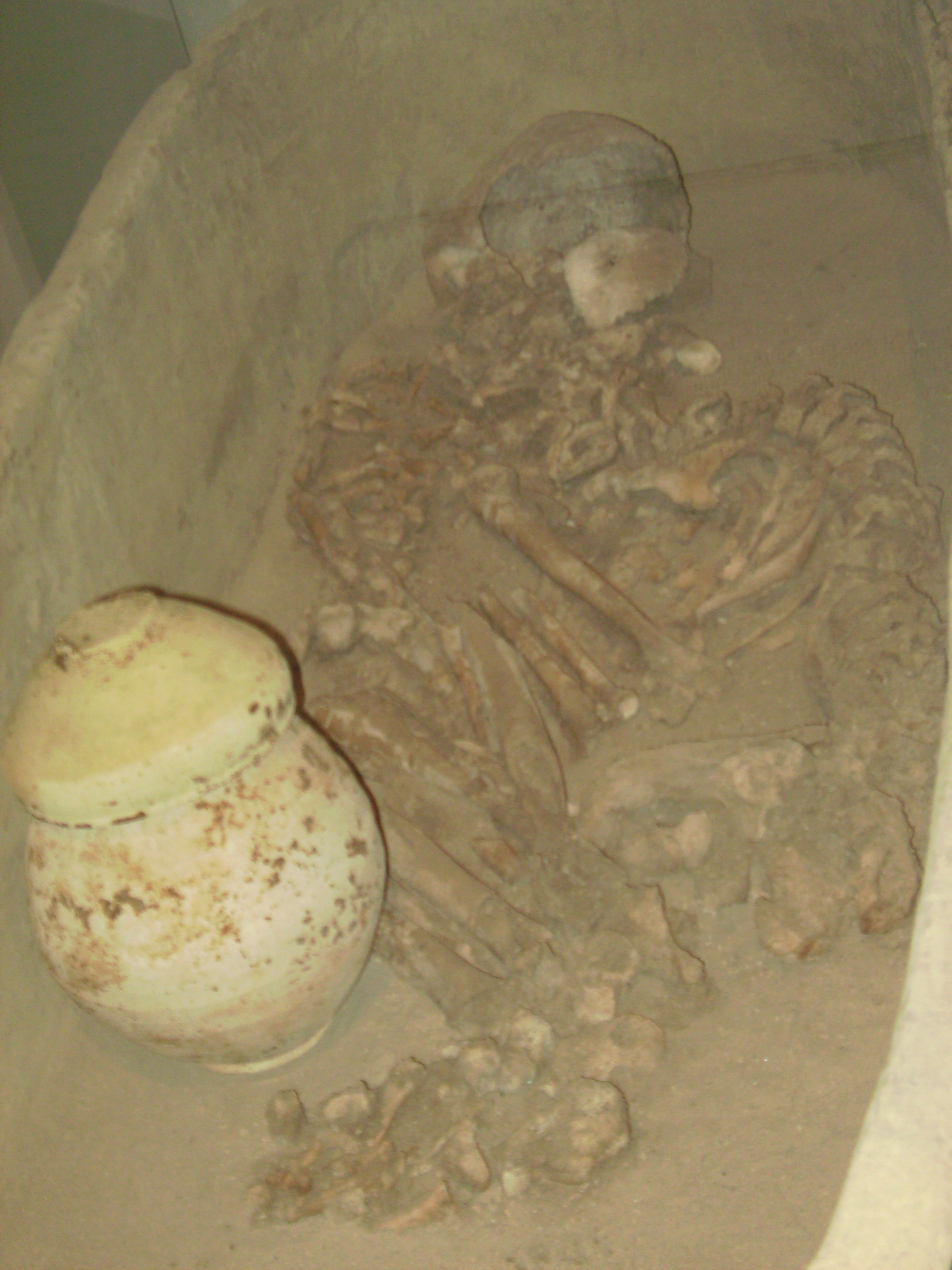
Assyrian Clay Coffin, dating from the 6th century BC.

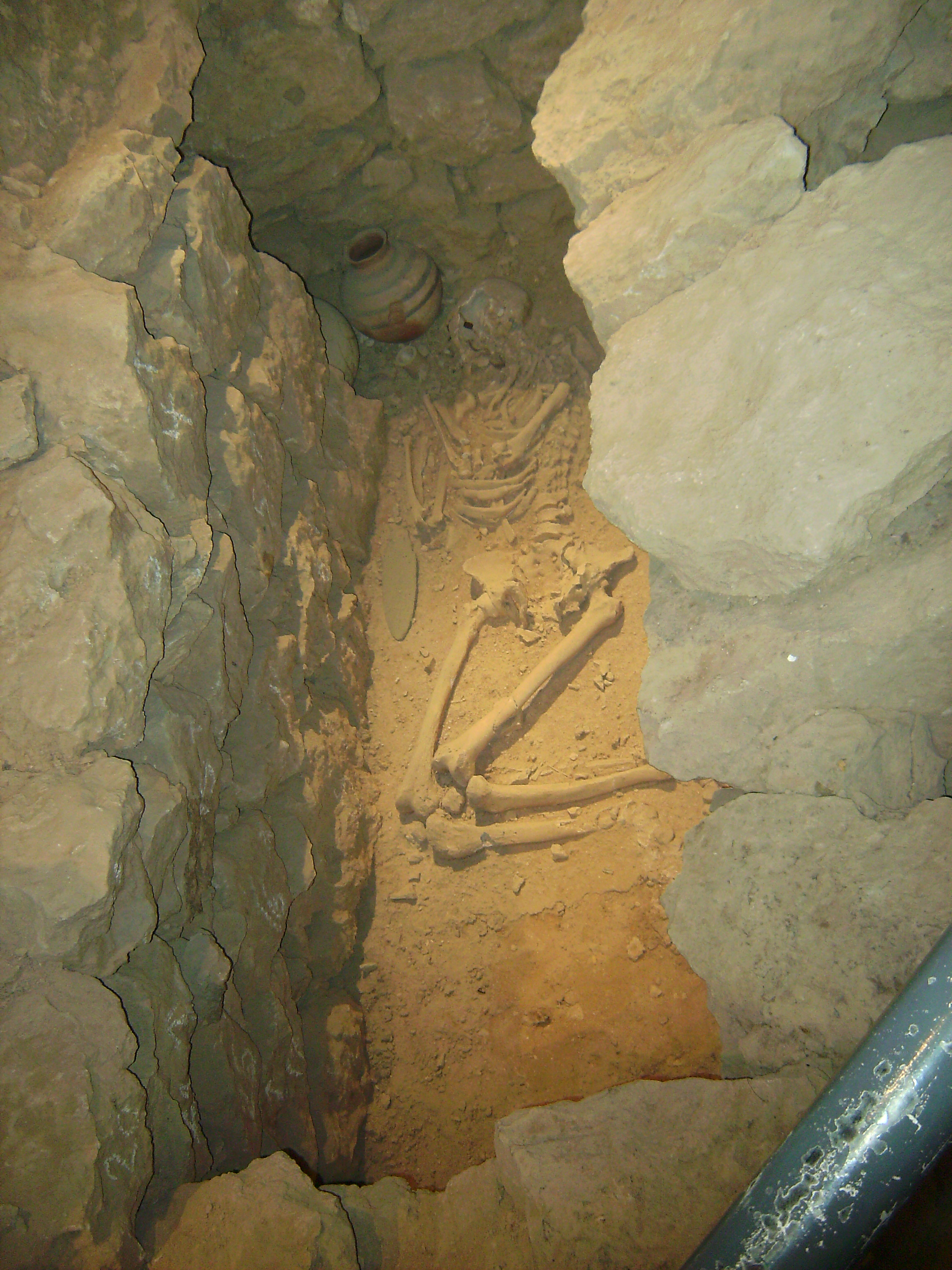
Early burial mound, originally in Hamad Town, moved to the museum.

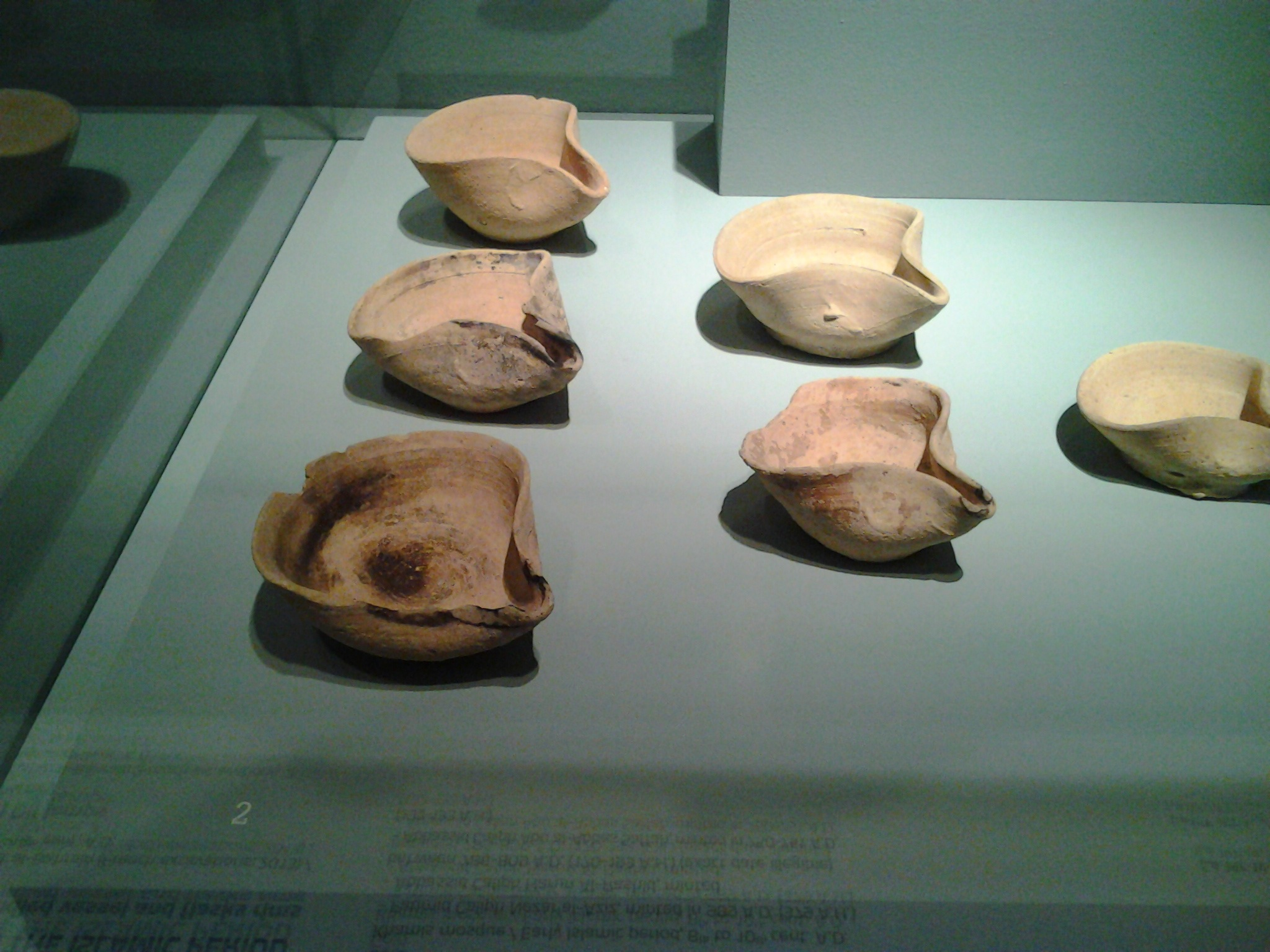
Oil lamps on exhibit

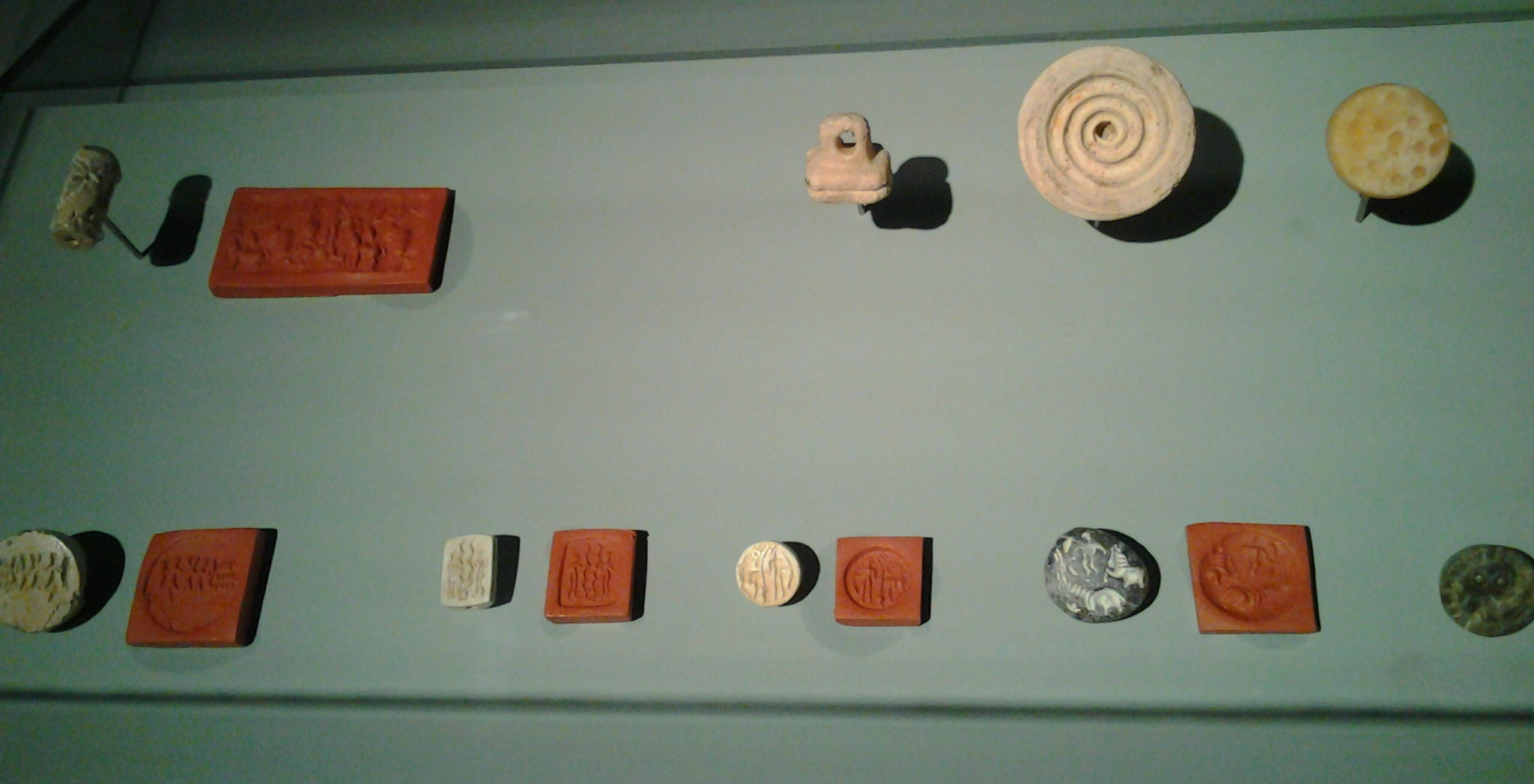
Seals from early Dilmun period (2000-1800 B.C.).

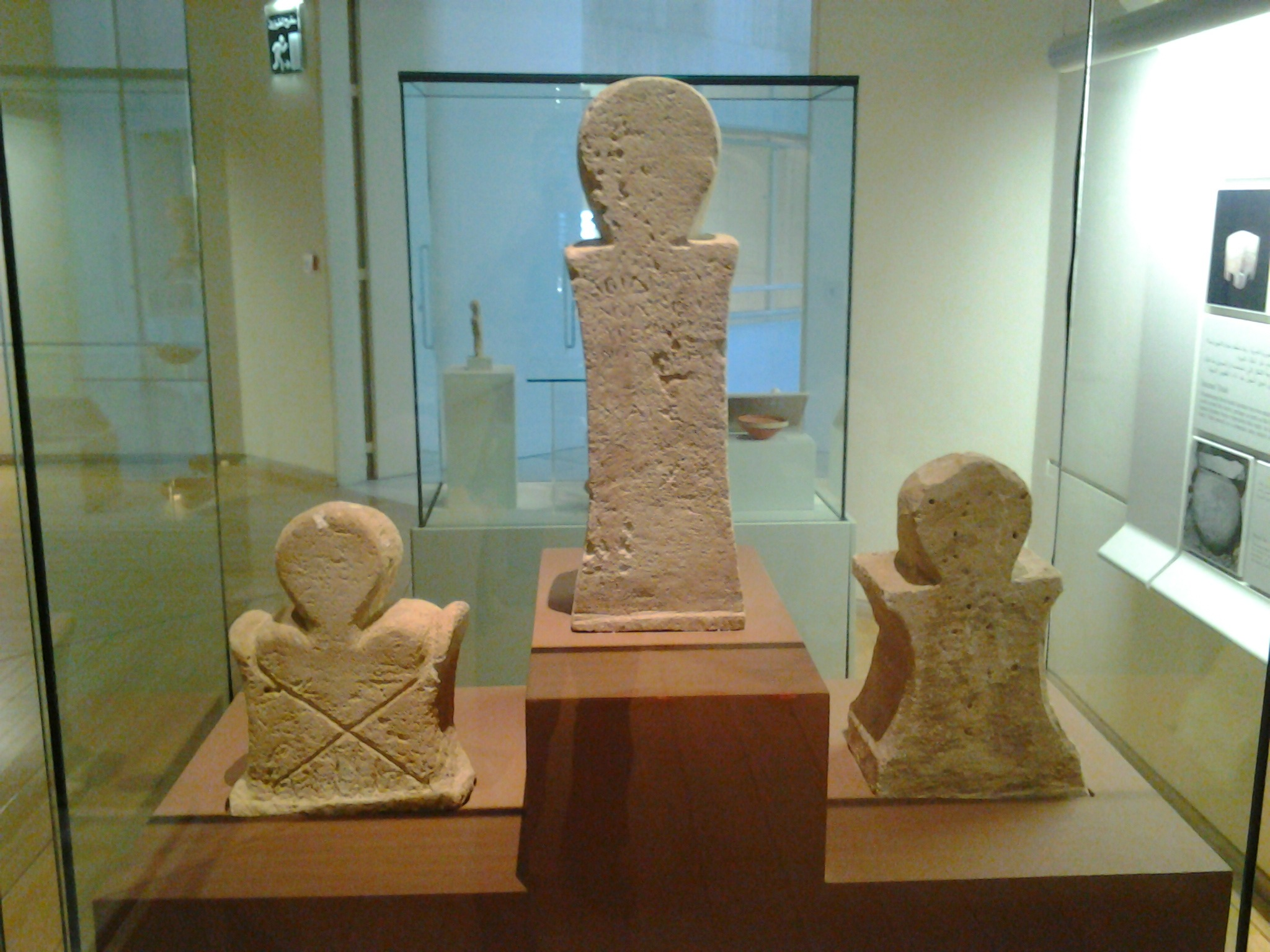
Hellenic tombstones from the Tylos era.

== See also ==
- Beit Al Qur'an
- History of Bahrain
- Tourism in Bahrain
- List of museums in Bahrain
