= Durand Stone =

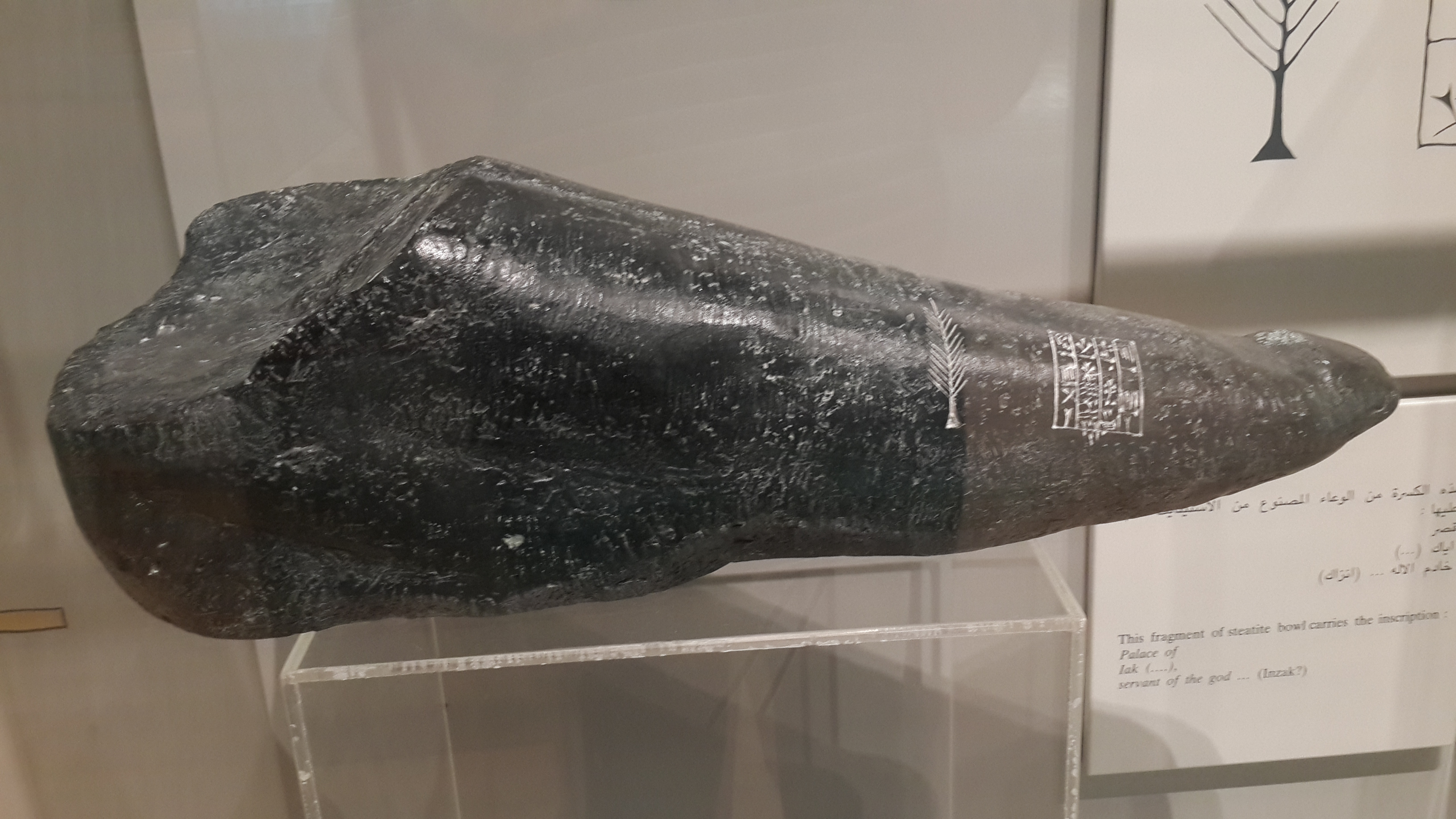
- Material: Basalt
- Size: length: c. 75 cm width: c. 27.5 cm
- Created: c. 1378 BC
- Present location: Manama, Capital, Bahrain

The Durand Stone is an artifact in Bahrain dating back to the Kassite period (1600 BC — 1155 BC). Named after Captain Edward Law Durand who had first identified it, the stone is a 25–30 cm wide and 70–80 cm long black diorite sculpture identified by Durand as "shaped like the prow of a boat, or an animal's tongue" with inscriptions in "evidently Babylonian or Assyrian Cuneiform, but some of the characters look like hieroglyphs."

== Contents ==
The inscription, in Old Babylonian cuneiform script, was translated by Henry Rawlinson to read: "The palace of Rimum, servant of (the god) Inzak, (and) man of (the tribe of) Agarum". Inzak, son of Enki, was a principal god of Bahrain, and the Durand Stone provides archaeological evidence for identifying these islands as 'the abode of the blessed' of Dilmun referred to by Sumerian literature.

== History ==
Originally housed in the "holy of holies" (perhaps the Mihrab) of the Madrasseh-i Daood mosque (now destroyed) in Bilad Al Qadeem, it was acquired in 1878 by Captain Edward Law Durand who told the local "Moolahs" that the stone was used by "fire worshippers" and offering money to repair the mosque in exchange for taking it. The stone itself was reportedly removed by a slave of "Sheikh Ahmed."

=== Today ===
According to the records of Charles Belgrave, the Durand Stone was destroyed during World War II. A replica of the Durand Stone lies in the Bahrain National Museum.
