= Adhari Park =

Amusement park in Bahrain

Coordinates: 26.1985264°N 50.5454798°E

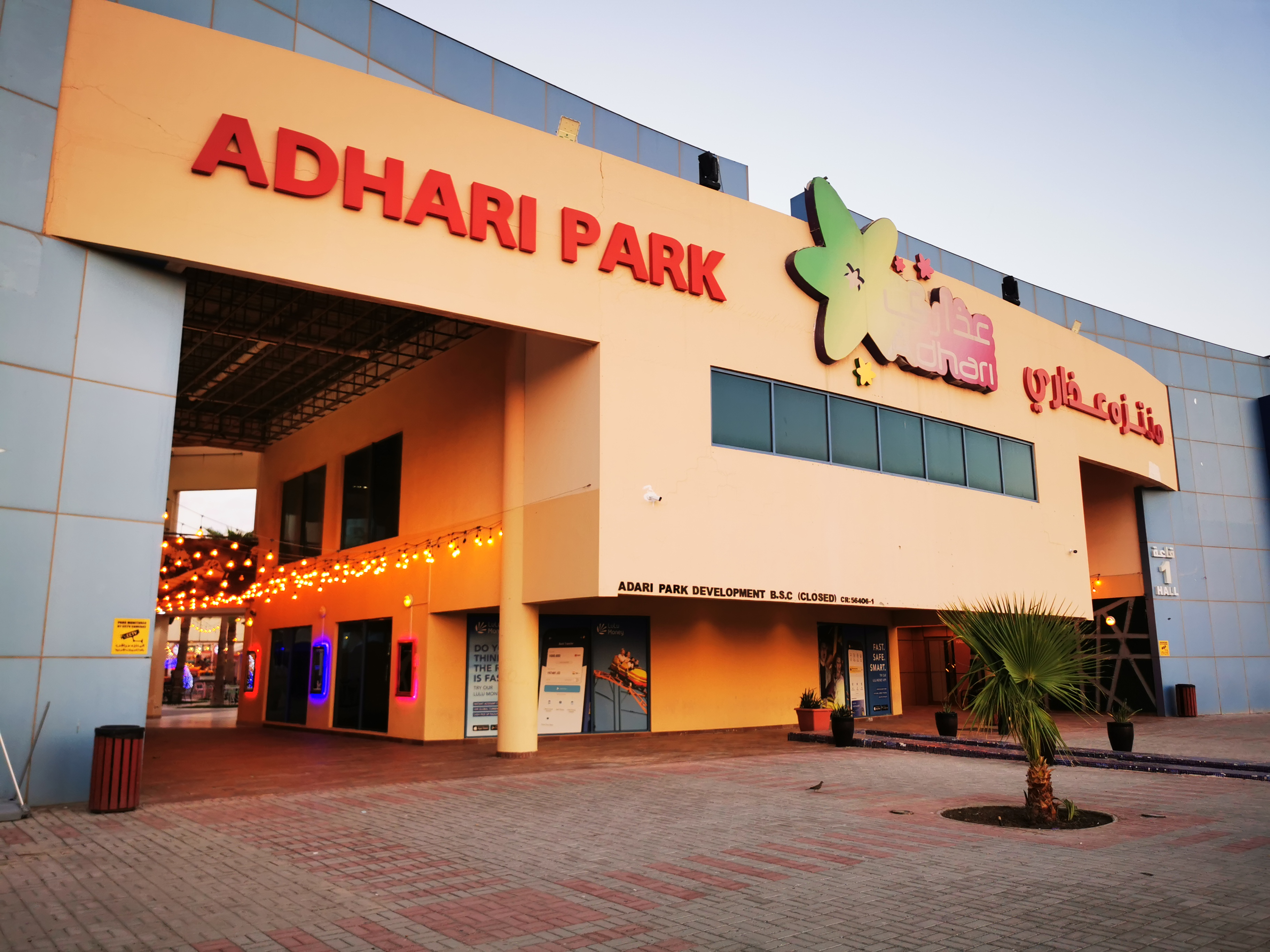
Adhari park entrance, 2023.

Adhari Park is an amusement park located in the Kingdom of Bahrain. It is named after the nearby historic freshwater spring known locally as Ain Adhari (Arabic: عين عذاري).

== Park history ==
The park is located south of the town of Bilad Al Qadeem and west of the Zinj district of the Bahraini capital Manama. It is positioned alongside the Shaikh Isa Bin Salman highway which connects southern Manama westbound to central Bahrain and ending at the King Fahd Causeway to Saudi Arabia. The area surrounding the spring being first remodeled in 2003 at a cost of 600,000 Bahraini dinars. Further renovation work in the 2000s costing 15 million Bahraini dinars ($22 million) was completed. It opened to the public in April 2008 and covers an area of 165,000 square meters. It has 8 outdoor and indoor rides for people of all ages, a Family Entertainment Centre, a food outlet at the Food Court, a dine-in restaurant, multiple coffee shops, and 1200 parking spaces.

In 2009, the park reported 800,000 visitors since its opening.

In the 2010s, the park developed debts exceeding 900,000 Bahraini dinars in municipal and rental fees. This was partly blamed in the aftermath of the 2011 Bahrain unrest which saw a decline in visitors to the park in the years that followed, a trend that was observed in the tourism sector overall at the time. An out of court settlement was achieved in 2017 between the Adhari Park Development Company which manages the park and the Capital Trustees Authority. The park temporarily closed in September 2020 during the COVID-19 pandemic as it was unable to pay 34,000 Bahraini dinars in outstanding electricity and water bills.

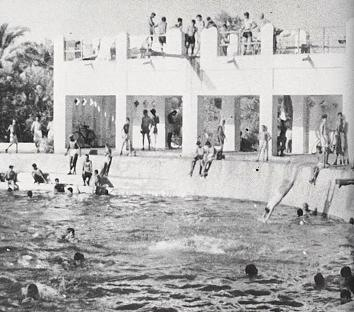
The Adhari spring, c. 1940s.

== Adhari Spring ==
Adhari Spring is a freshwater spring that is regarded as the largest in Bahrain; it had been mentioned in Bahraini folklore for at least 800 years, with historians believing it being much older. One myth states the spring was founded by a girl searching for water although other folklore exist.

The spring is traditionally a site for recreation amongst Bahraini families with its cool waters, and its natural channels were historically used as a washing site for clothes prior to the widespread use of laundry machines. It fell into disrepair by the early 2000s with its stagnant waters leading to the proliferation of algae and moss, and the spring itself drying out alongside its channels.

The spring was re-developed in 2006 into a modern swimming pool but was plagued with persistent structural issues such as tile damage, water seepage and crack formations. The spring was closed in early 2020 during the COVID-19 pandemic in Bahrain and has yet to be re-opened as of January 2026.

== See also ==
- Tourist attractions in Bahrain
