= Tashan, Bahrain =

Village in Bahrain

Coordinates: 26.210°N 50.546°E

Tashan (Arabic:طشان) is a village located in the Kingdom of Bahrain, on the western outskirts of the capital city Manama. It is a village adjacent to Bilad Al Qadeem but significantly smaller.

== History ==
Tashan is situated 'constituency one' in the Northern Governorate administrative region. The constituency is also the largest constituency in the country, with more than 17,000 voters. In the 2010 Bahraini parliamentary elections, the constituency's seat in parliament was won by Matar Matar from Al Wefaq National Islamic Society, after obtaining a landslide victory of 85.7%. The seat was vacated after Matar resigned as part of an en-masse resignation by 18 Al Wefaq MPs during the Arab Spring uprising in February 2011, in protest of an earlier crackdown on protesters. By-elections were held for the seats were held on 24 September later that year, with independent Ali Hassan Ali winning constituency one's seat.

The village was hit economically by the unrest, with traders reporting in March 2011 that there was a low turnout of customers.
