= Khamis, Bahrain =

Village in Northern Governorate, Bahrain

Coordinates: 26°12′21″N 50°32′59″E

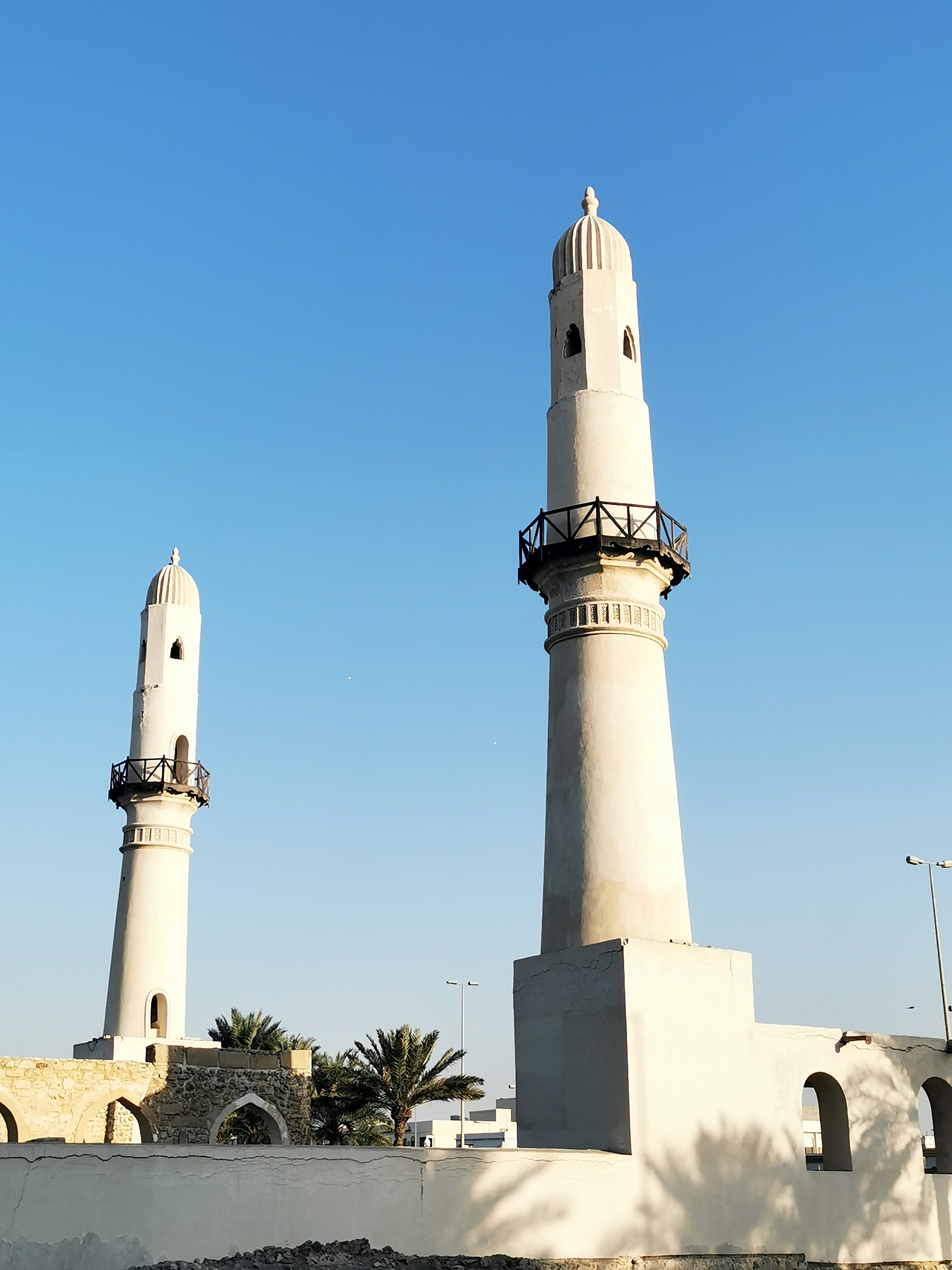
Khamis mosque in 2019.

Khamis (Arabic: الخميس) is a village located in the Kingdom of Bahrain. It is most famous for being the site of the Khamis Mosque, Bahrain's first mosque which dates back to 692 AD, and a popular tourist attraction.

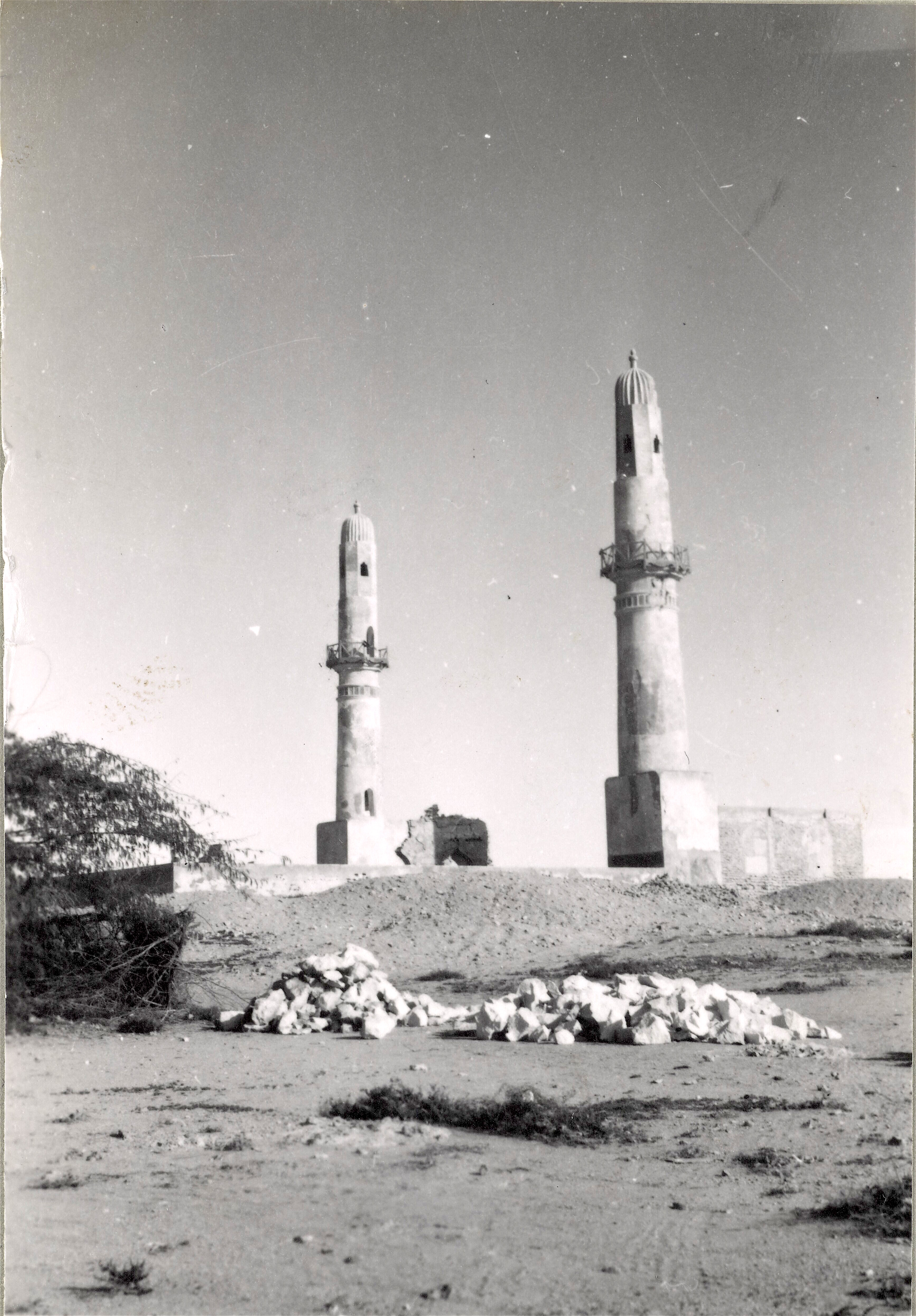
The Khamis Mosque in 1956.

== Etymology ==
The area used to be host a weekly souq every Thursday, hence its name Khamis which is the Arabic word for Thursday.

== Geography ==
Khamis lies west of the capital Manama. It is bordered by Tashan to the north, Bilad al Qadeem to the east, Sehla to the west and the freshwater Adhari area to the south.

Khamis is largely a residential area with a number of shops and business establishments.

== See also ==
- Khamis Mosque
- Manama
