= Bilad Al Qadeem =

Bilad Al Qadeem البلاد القديم
- Town
- Location in Bahrain
- Coordinates: 26°12′25″N 50°33′28″E
- Country: Bahrain
- Governorate: Capital Governorate

Bilad al-Qadeem (Arabic: البلاد القديم, The old country) is a suburb of Manama, the capital city of Bahrain.

Bilad al-Qadeem used to be a separate town situated next to the village of Zinj until it was incorporated into Manama in the 20th century. The town was the historical and Islamic capital of Bahrain during much of the country's history.

== History ==
The town is believed to have been one of the earliest settlements on the island of Bahrain. The area was a traditional area of rich agriculture and learning, with multiple date farms, orchards and gardens in the town's vicinity. In the 1600s, the visiting Portuguese explorer Pedro Teixeira noted that the town cultivated an extensive amount of wheat and barley.

=== Safavid era ===
Prior to the Portuguese invasion in 1519, Bilad al-Qadeem served as the provincial capital of Bahrain and did so again later when Safavid rule was restored in 1602. The town was traditionally a centre for Twelver Shi`ism, particularly in the Usuli theological thought, and was the seat of the chief mujtahid of the islands, who was the second most influential political figure after the Persian governor. The cleric, locally known as Shaikh al-Ra'is (Arabic: شيخ الرئيس), was carefully chosen from the Safavid capital, Isfahan.

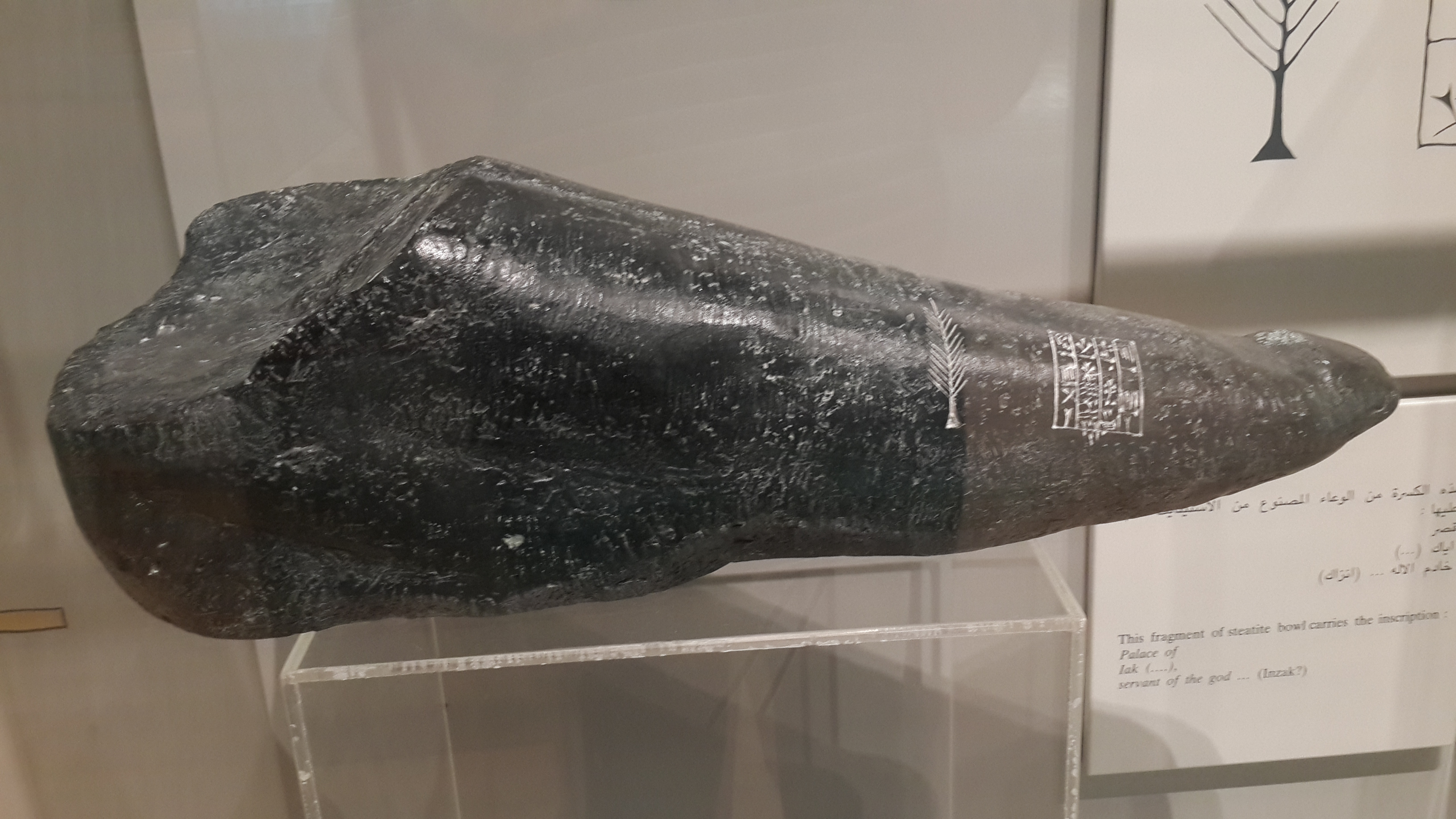
Durand Stone replica at the Bahrain National Museum.

=== 19th century ===
The Durand Stone, an artifact that provided the first archaeological evidence of the existence of the Dilmun civilisation in Bahrain, was first discovered here by Captain Edward Law Durand.

=== 20th century ===
In J. G. Lorimer's Gazetteer of the Persian Gulf, the town was described as a large scattered village with some 350 mud houses and ruins in 1908. The village had several quarters including Bilad-ar-Rafi (Arabic: بلاد الرفيع) to the west, and the Khamis souq (Arabic: سوق الخميس) to the northwest where a weekly market was held year long. The ruins of the Madrasah Abu Zaidan (likely the Khamis Mosque) are situated 0.5 mile west of the village. The Abu Zaidan spring was also reported to be located amongst the ruins of the village. The population of Bilad al Qadeem in 1908 consisted of the Baharna, many of whom worked as pearl merchants, tailors and farmers. Amongst crops grown were date palms (estimated number of 11,500), figs, pomegranates, roses, jasmines, and almonds.

== Notable sites ==
Bilad al-Qadeem is a well known site for ancient monuments such as the Khamis Mosque in the Khamis area, Saboor Mosque, Al Darah Mosque, Holy Alawyyah school and Abu-Anbarah cemetery.
