= Destruction of Shia mosques during the 2011 Bahraini uprising =

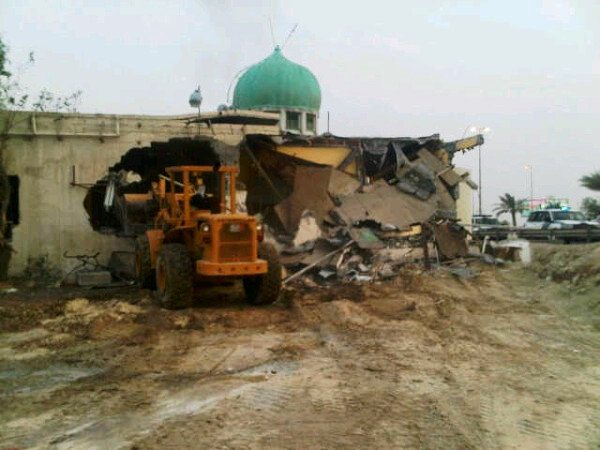
The 400-year-old Sheikh Mohammed al-Barbaghi Mosque being demolished.

During the 2011 Bahraini uprising, as many as 43 Shia mosques and tens of other religious structures including graves, shrines and hussainiyas (religious meeting houses) were intentionally destroyed or damaged by the ruling Sunni Bahraini authorities in the country. The widespread action in Shiite villages across this island was seen as part of a government crackdown on Shiite dissidents, although Bahrain's Minister of Justice and Islamic Affairs, Sheikh Khalid bin Ali bin Abdulla al Khalifa, claimed that only mosques illegally built without permission had been targeted.

The Bahrain Center for Human Rights has classified the widespread cultural destruction as "crimes of genocide under the UN Convention on Genocide (1948)."

== Extent of destruction ==
In July 2011, Iranian media reported that at least 52 mosques and over 500 religious Shi'ite sites had been levelled in Bahrain. Among those destroyed was the 400-year-old Amir Muhammad Barbaghi Mosque in the town of Aali. In Nuwaidrat, where the first anti-government protests began on February 14, only the portico of the Mu'min Mosque was left standing. Many others in the village were also bulldozed. Graffiti insulting the Shi'ites was also left on some of the desecrated mosques.

Funerary monuments and shrines belonging to Shi'ites were attacked as well. The tomb of Abdul Amir al-Jamri, who died in 2006, was stripped of its golden dome. The 8th-century mausoleum of Sa'sa'a ibn Sawhan was also damaged and looted during the uprising.

== Motivation ==
The government of Bahrain made it clear that “they had engaged in dismantling structures which had been erected without legal authorisation.” However, the widespread demolitions were reprisals for Shia involvement in the protests against the ruling Sunni discrimination against their community. The involvement of Saudi troops indicated that some elements were trying to impose the Wahhabi doctrine which views shrines as un-Islamic.

== Reaction ==
In May, senior Bahraini Shiite clerics, including Isa Qassim, condemned what they called "the shameless destruction of mosques." Qassim later urged the government to show "full respect" and rebuild all the demolished sites. The Ministry of Justice had earlier stated mosques had been demolished "to protect houses of worship and maintain their sanctity." The government continued to defend its actions saying "these are not mosques; these are illegal buildings," having been built recently without permits. Sheikh Ali Salman of the main opposition group al-Wefaq said some of the mosques had been 20 to 30 years old, some even older. Al-Wefaq said the government couldn't justify the demolition and that "any attempt to showcase the measure as a legal action will neither be convincing nor objective."

The US State Department said it was "concerned by the destruction of religious sites" and in a policy speech about the Middle East on May 19, President Obama mentioned "Shia must never have their mosques destroyed in Bahrain."

Sunni politician Faisal Fulad of the pro-government Bahrain Human Rights Watch Society said “large or old mosques had not been affected.” "These are small mosques, buildings built there without papers." New York based Human Rights Watch said the government's sudden interest in mosque licences when it was busy with security issues was suspicious. Human Rights First noted that the demolitions had triggered demonstrations in other parts of the Arab world and said they could exacerbate Sunni-Shia tensions throughout the region. A spokesman said "Bulldozing mosques will only inflame the tensions in Bahrain, not restore stability," and that the "US government's silence on [the destruction of places of worship in] Bahrain is deafening." In response to an article appearing in The Independent (19 April 2011), the London-based Mosques and Imams National Advisory Board condemned "in the strongest sense the actions of the Bahraini government in the destruction of Mosques in Bahrain."

== Recent developments ==
In January 2012, it was reported that the Bahraini government said it would rebuild 12 Shia mosques demolished during unrest after an independent report addressed the issue. In December, police had hindered residents of Nuwaidrat who were attempting to rebuild the mosques themselves.

== See also ==
- 1953 East German uprising
- Wahhabi sack of Karbala
