= Askar, Bahrain =

Village in Bahrain

Coordinates: 26°3′24.97″N 50°36′58.79″E

Askar (Arabic: عسكر) is a village on the southeastern coast of Bahrain, it is a separate village and is different from Madinat Khalifa. It is also home to the shrine of Sa'sa'a bin Sohan, a companion of Imam Ali. The majority of the inhabitants today are from the tribes of Al-Buainain, Al-Kaabi, Al-Awazem, and Al-Mansoori. Many of the inhabitants have been living in the village for more than three to four generations. The population in the area after 2020 has doubled due to the government housing projects.

== History ==
Ṣa‘ṣa‘ah Bin Sohan was exiled by Muawiyah I to Bahrain, where it is believed he lived in the village of Askar until he died in 666 AD. His grave lies in the village of Askar, and is visited by many Shia Muslims.

Askar was believed to be founded Shortly before the arrival of Islam to the islands of Bahrain, It used to be primarily resided by Baharna Shi’ite Muslims however sometime in the 1700s it was abandoned due to Bedouin Raids and large Sunni Migrations, and with no protection the Shia population fled and migrated to the village of Ma’ameer close to the island of Sitra.

== See also ==
- Mausoleum of Sa'sa'a ibn Sawhan
