= Sehla =

Village in Northern Governorate, Bahrain

Sehla سهلة
- Village
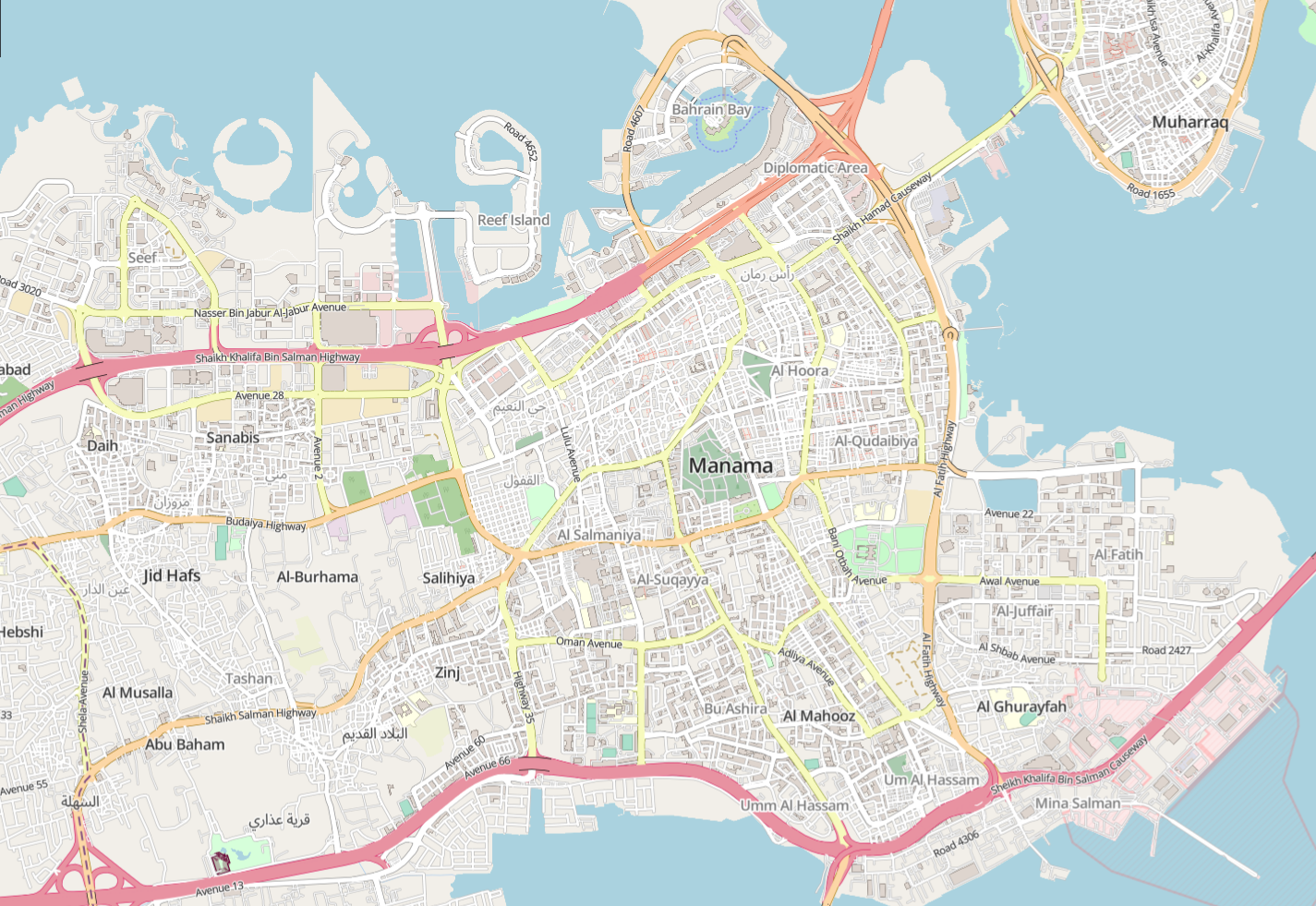
- Map of Manama including Sehla to the west.

- Location within Bahrain
- Coordinates: 26°12′07″N 50°32′03″E
- Country: Bahrain
- Governorate: Northern Governorate
- Time zone: UTC+03:00

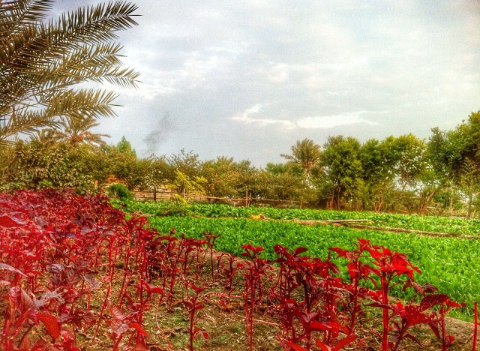
A South Sehla farm

Sehla (Arabic: سهلة) is a village located in the north of Bahrain, on the outskirts of the capital city Manama. It is located in the Northern Governorate administrative region and is west of Khamis. The village is divided into two sections; North Sehla and South Sehla. This is due to the construction of a highway that passes through the village's centre.

== Subdivisions ==
Sehla is divided into two sections:

- North Sehla - Most trading facilities and schools are located in this part of the village.
- South Sehla - It is the smaller part of the two divisions, composed predominantly of farmland.

== History ==
Sehla is the location of the Shaikh Abdul Aziz mosque, a revered local shrine. Situated in the middle of a busy traffic intersection, it contains the grave of a local religious scholar named Abdul Aziz which was slated to be removed in the 1970s to make way for new roadworks as part of ongoing urbanisation in the country. Local folklore stated that every bulldozer sent to the site to remove the grave malfunctioned; in some versions, the lead foreman tried to detonate the grave with dynamite but accidentally killed himself whilst leaving the grave unharmed. Following this, Bahraini authorities rerouted the road around the grave leading to the current shrine being sited in a traffic junction. The shrine later became famous nationally as news of its resistance to demolition had spread. The area sees regular visitors from across Bahrain as well as from Saudi Arabia, with the mosque being particularly busy on weekends.

In 2008, protestors clashed with police in the village, which left three cars and a workshop burned down.

== Infrastructure ==
The highway passing through the village is currently scheduled for expansion work.

== Notable residents ==
- Jameel al-Nasser - In 2004, he broke the world record for the longest non-stop talk given by a person in 66 hours, breaking previous record-holder Zimbabwean Errol Muzawazi, who spoke on Polish democracy for 62 hours. He had spoken about neurolinguistic programming in Arabic during the 66 hours.
