= Sa'sa'a ibn Suhan =

Ṣa‘ṣa‘ah ibn Suhān (Arabic: صعصعة بن صوحان) was born in the year 598 CE, corresponding to about 24 years before Hijra in Qatif, Saudi Arabia. He was a companion of ‘Alī and is revered by the Shia.

He belonged to the tribe of Abdul Qays. He was a prolific writer, an orator, and brother of Zayd ibn Suhan.

Ṣa‘ṣa‘ah was exiled by Muawiyah I to Bahrain, where he died in 666 CE, corresponding to 44 AH. His grave lies in the village of Askar, and is visited by many Shia Muslims.
