= Khamis Mosque =

Mosque in Khamis, Manama, Bahrain

Al Khamis Mosque
- مَسْجِدُ ٱلْخَمِيسِ
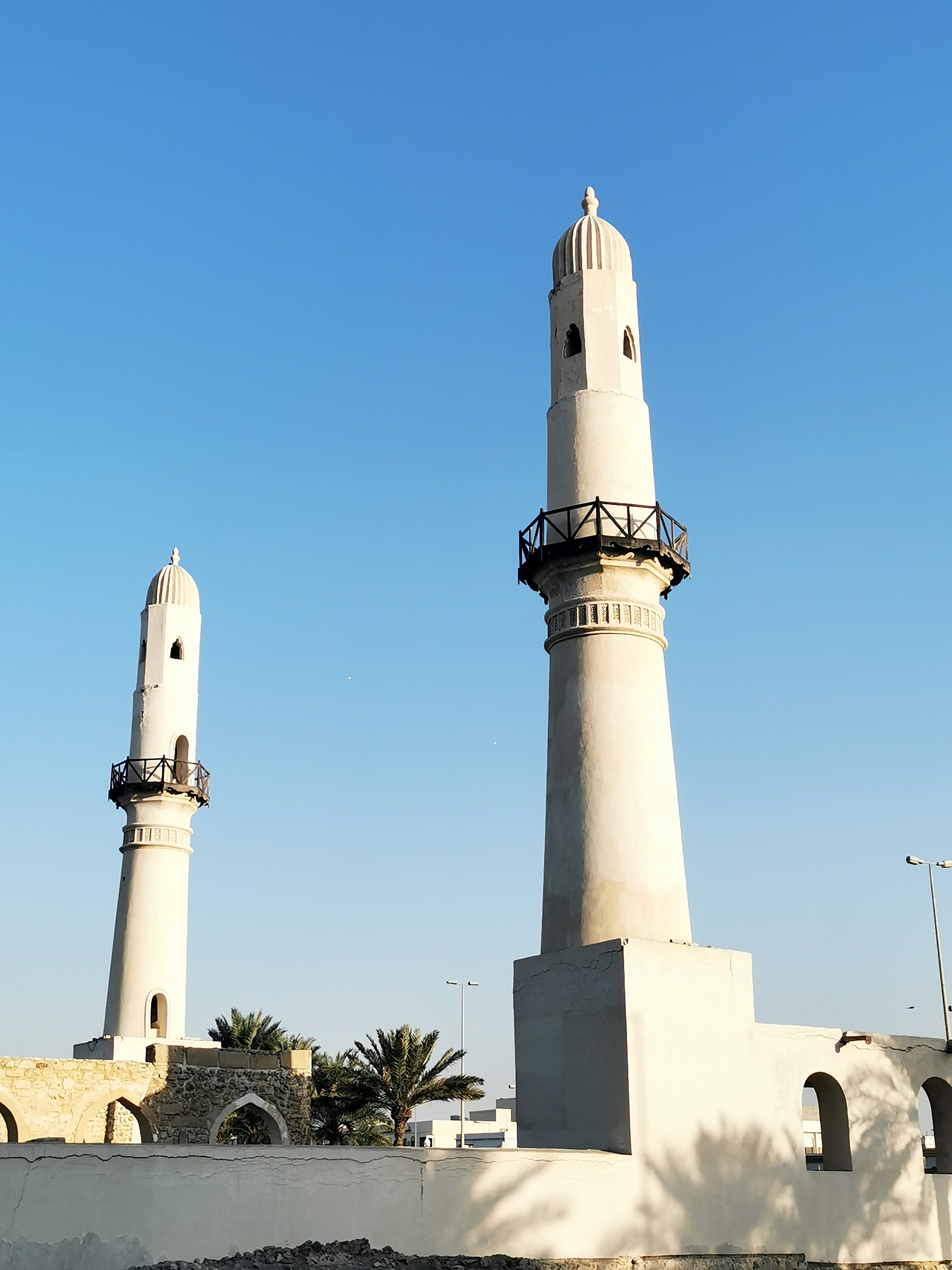
- The mosque in 2019

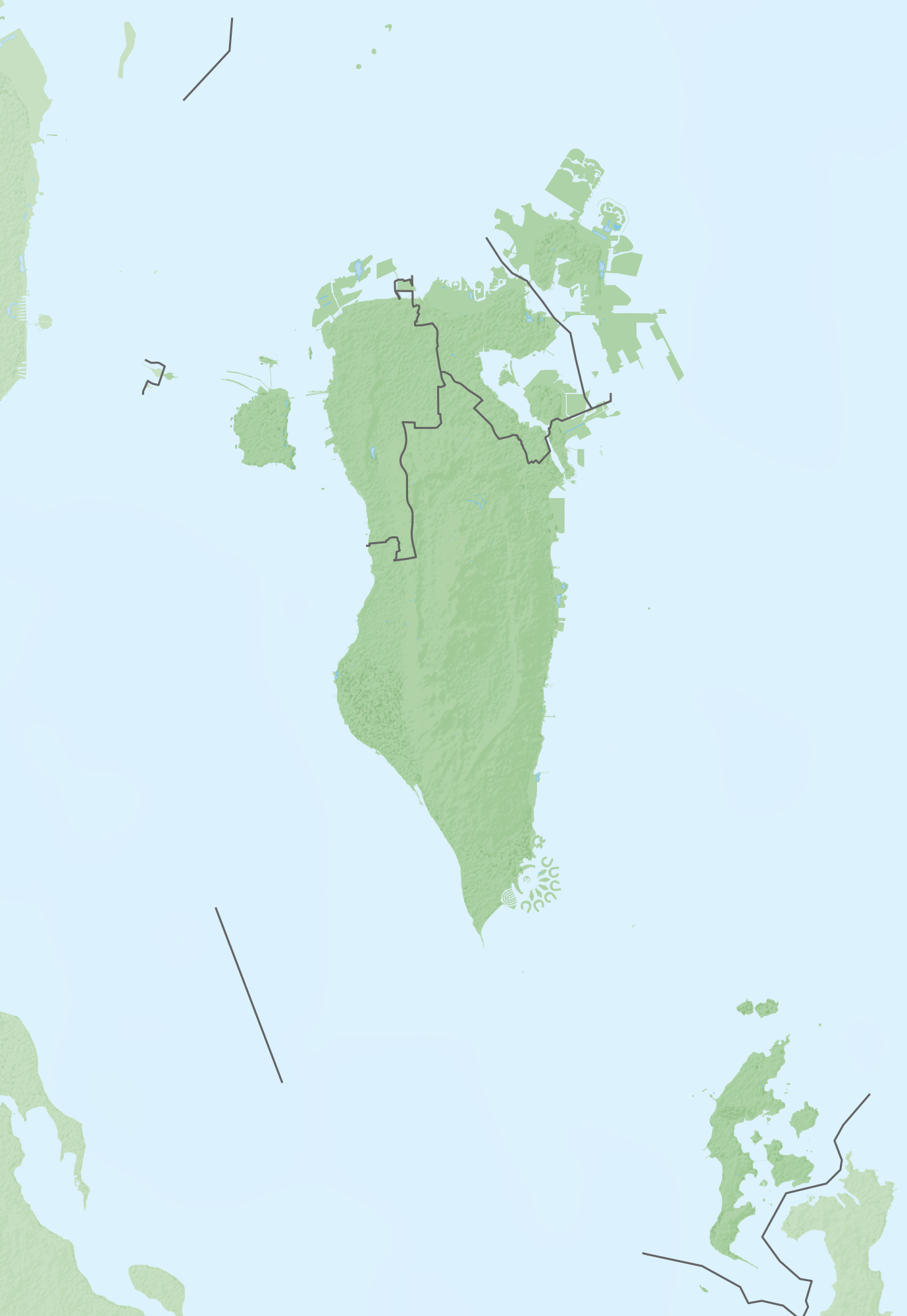
- Location of the mosque in Bahrain

Religion
- Affiliation: Islam
- Ecclesiastical or organisational status: Mosque
- Status: Active

Location
- Location: Khamis, Manama
- Country: Bahrain
- Interactive map of Al Khamis Mosque
- Coordinates: 26°12′30″N 50°32′54″E

Architecture
- Established: 692 CE
- Completed: 11th century CE

Specifications
- Length: 22.79 m (74.8 ft)
- Width: 20 m (66 ft)
- Minaret: Two
- Site area: 113 by 48 m (371 by 157 ft)
- Materials: Stone; timber; limestone

The Khamis Mosque (Arabic: مَسْجِدُ ٱلْخَمِيسِ, romanized: Masǧid al-ḫamīs) is believed to be the first mosque in Bahrain, built during the era of the Umayyad caliph Umar II in Khamis. According to Al Wasat journalist Kassim Hussain, other sources mention that it was built in a later era during the rule of Uyunids with one minaret. The second minaret was built two centuries later during the rule of Usfurids.

The identical twin minarets of this mosque make it easily noticeable as one drives along the Shaikh Salman Road in Khamis.

== History ==
The Khamis Mosque is considered to be one of the oldest mosques in the Middle East, as its foundation is believed to have been laid as early as 692 CE. An inscription found on the site, however, suggests a foundation date of sometime during the 11th century CE. It has since been rebuilt twice in both the 14th and 15th centuries, when the minarets were constructed. The Khamis Mosque has been partially restored recently.

The present building has two main phases. During the 14th century CE, an early prayer hall with a flat roof supported by wooden columns was completed. A later section of the flat roof was added, supported on arches resting on thick masonry piers (which have been dated to 1339).

Islam was propagated to Bahrain in the 7th century CE when Muhammad sent an envoy Al-Ala'a Al-Hadrami, preaching Islam to Munzir ibn Sawa Al Tamimi, the Governor of Qatar and Bahrain at the time.

A limestone slab, in the form of a mihrab was discovered during restoration works on the mosque and is believed to have originated from the 12th century CE. Inscriptions of two verses from the Qur'an are present on the slab, Qur'anic surah XXI, verses 34–35, which are normally used on gravestones.

== Gallery ==
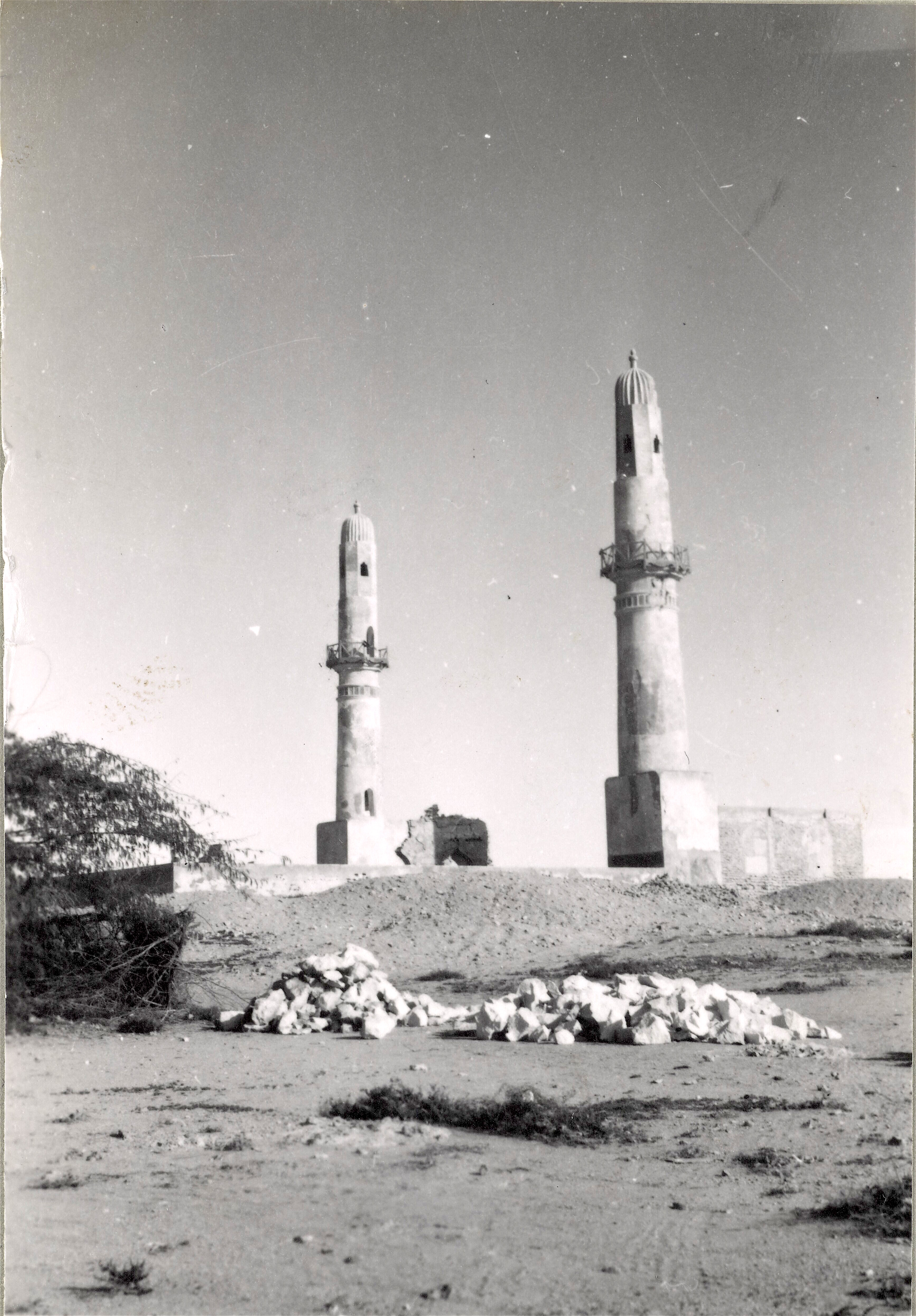
The mosque in 1956

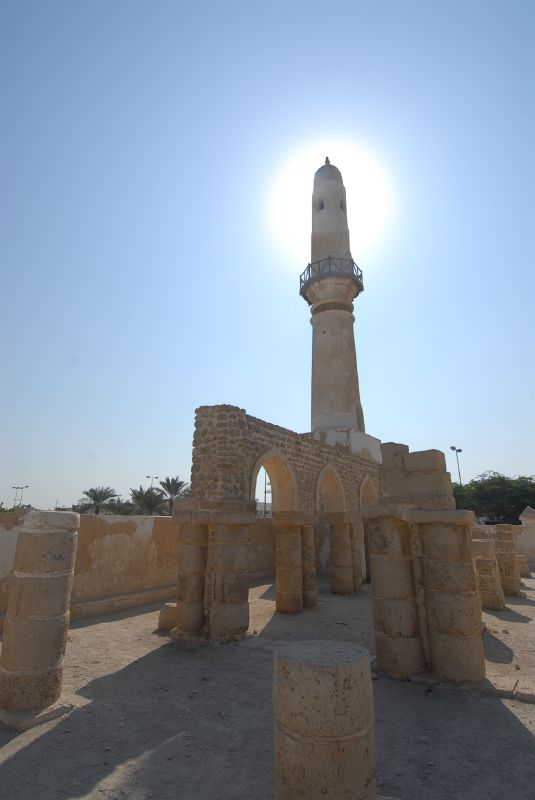
The mosque minaret

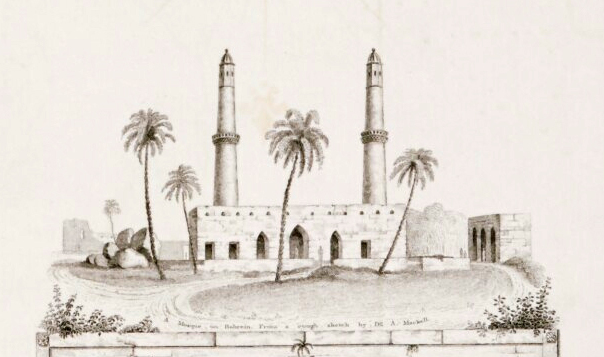
Drawing of the mosque in an 1825 map.

== See also ==
- Islam in Bahrain
- History of Bahrain
- List of archaeological sites in Bahrain
- List of mosques in Bahrain
