= Embassy of the Philippines, Manama =

Diplomatic mission of the Philippines in Bahrain

Embassy of the Philippines, Manama Pasuguan ng Pilipinas sa Manama سفارة الفلبين في المنامة

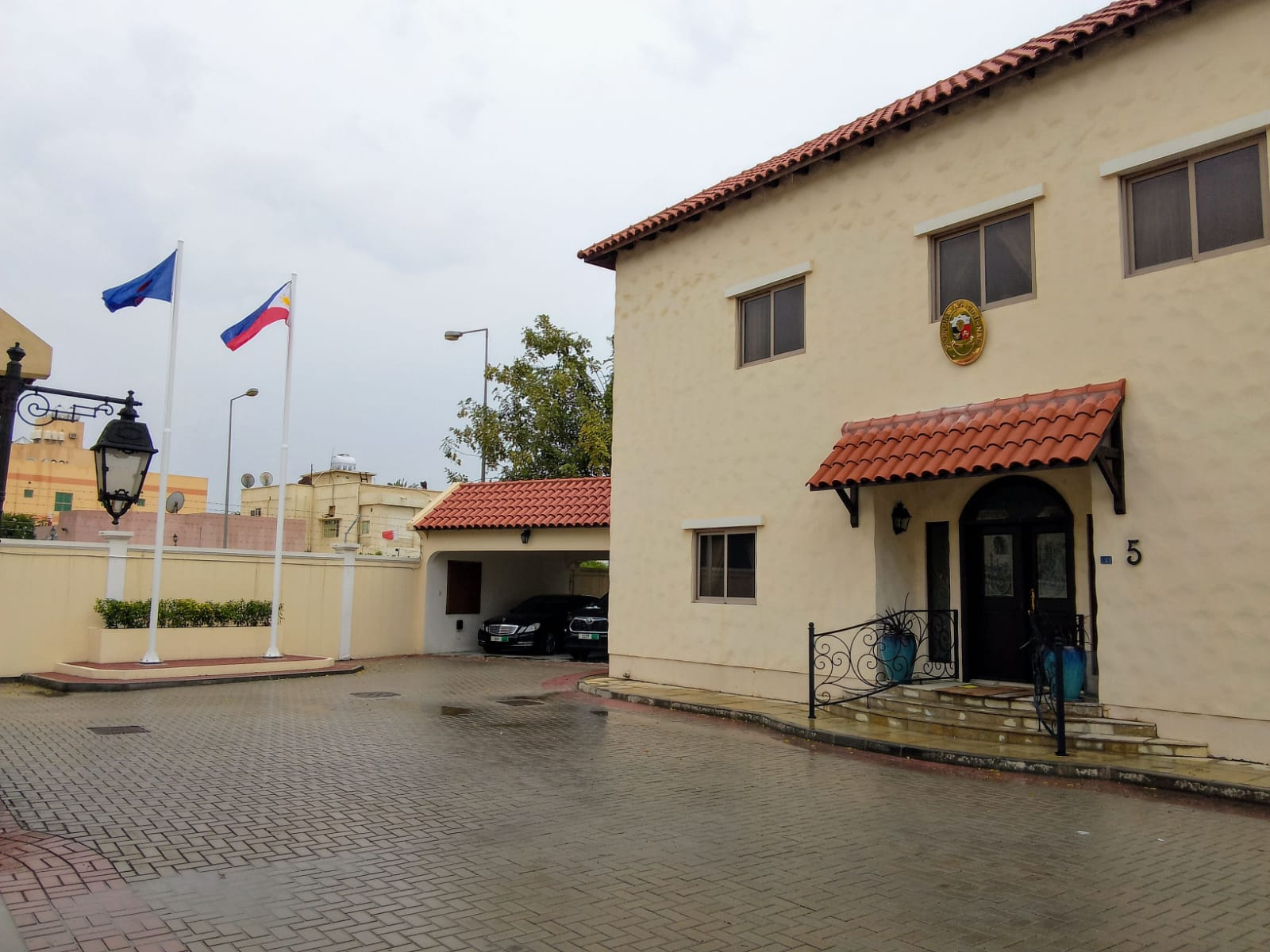
- Location: Manama
- Address: Building 2186, Road 2755, Block 327, Adliya
- Coordinates: 26°13′02″N 50°34′51″E
- Ambassador: Gines Jaime Ricardo D. Gallaga
- Website: manamape.dfa.gov.ph

The Embassy of the Philippines in Manama is the diplomatic mission of the Republic of the Philippines to the Kingdom of Bahrain. Opened in 1992, it is located in the Adliya neighborhood of central Manama, near the Salmaniya Medical Complex.

== History ==
Although the Philippines and Bahrain established diplomatic relations on November 27, 1978, a resident embassy in the country was not established until much later, with diplomatic relations initially being conducted through the Philippine Embassy in Riyadh.

A resident mission in Bahrain was only opened during the presidency of Corazon Aquino, when the embassy was formally opened on April 14, 1992. Leonides T. Caday, who would later be known as a target in the 2000 bombing of the Philippine Embassy in Jakarta, served as the mission's first resident ambassador.

== Building ==
The chancery of the Philippine Embassy in Manama is currently located in a four-villa compound in the Adliya neighborhood, which it relocated to on January 1, 2023.

Located about one km (0.6 mi) north of the previous chancery, which was situated in the nearby Bu Ghazal neighborhood, the new chancery was inaugurated on January 2, 2023, with its doors opening to the public the following day. A more formal inauguration attended by both Philippine and Bahraini officials, as well as the heads of the other resident Southeast Asian embassies in Manama and members of the local community, was later held on March 19, 2023, part of a number of celebrations leading to the 45th anniversary of Bahrain–Philippines relations.

In contrast to the previous chancery, the new chancery contains a larger floor area which can accommodate the embassy's various offices, with the consular section also containing a separate lactation room, as well as the Bahrain offices of various Philippine government agencies that cater to Overseas Filipino Workers (OFWs), such as the Philippine Overseas Labor Office, the Overseas Workers Welfare Administration and the Social Security System. A separate two-story villa within the compound also houses the Manama center of the Sentro Rizal, including a meeting hall and library, with the space decorated with artwork and poetry created by Bahrain-based Filipino artists and writers.

== Staff and activities ==
The Philippine Embassy in Manama is headed by Ambassador Gines Jaime Ricardo D. Gallaga, who was appointed to the position by President Bongbong Marcos on June 2, 2025. Prior to his appointment as ambassador, Gallaga, a career diplomat, served as consul general at the Philippine Embassy in Stockholm, where he also briefly served as chargé d'affaires. His appointment was confirmed by the Commission on Appointments on September 3, 2025, and he presented his credentials to King Hamad bin Isa Al Khalifa on January 20, 2026.

The embassy's activities center around providing to the welfare of the more than 40,000 Filipinos in Bahrain, many of whom are OFWs. These have included facilitating repatriations, with over 200 Filipinos being repatriated from Bahrain in 2021, and facilitating the regularization of Filipinos staying in the country illegally. The embassy is also active in organizing a number of cultural and economic activities, such as organizing a Philippine festival at a local mall, holding an art exhibition featuring art by Bahrain-based Filipino artists, and collaborating with Carrefour to promote Philippine food products.

== See also ==
- Bahrain–Philippines relations
- Filipinos in Bahrain
- List of diplomatic missions of the Philippines
- List of diplomatic missions in Bahrain
