= Central Business District, Manama =

Area of Manama, Bahrain

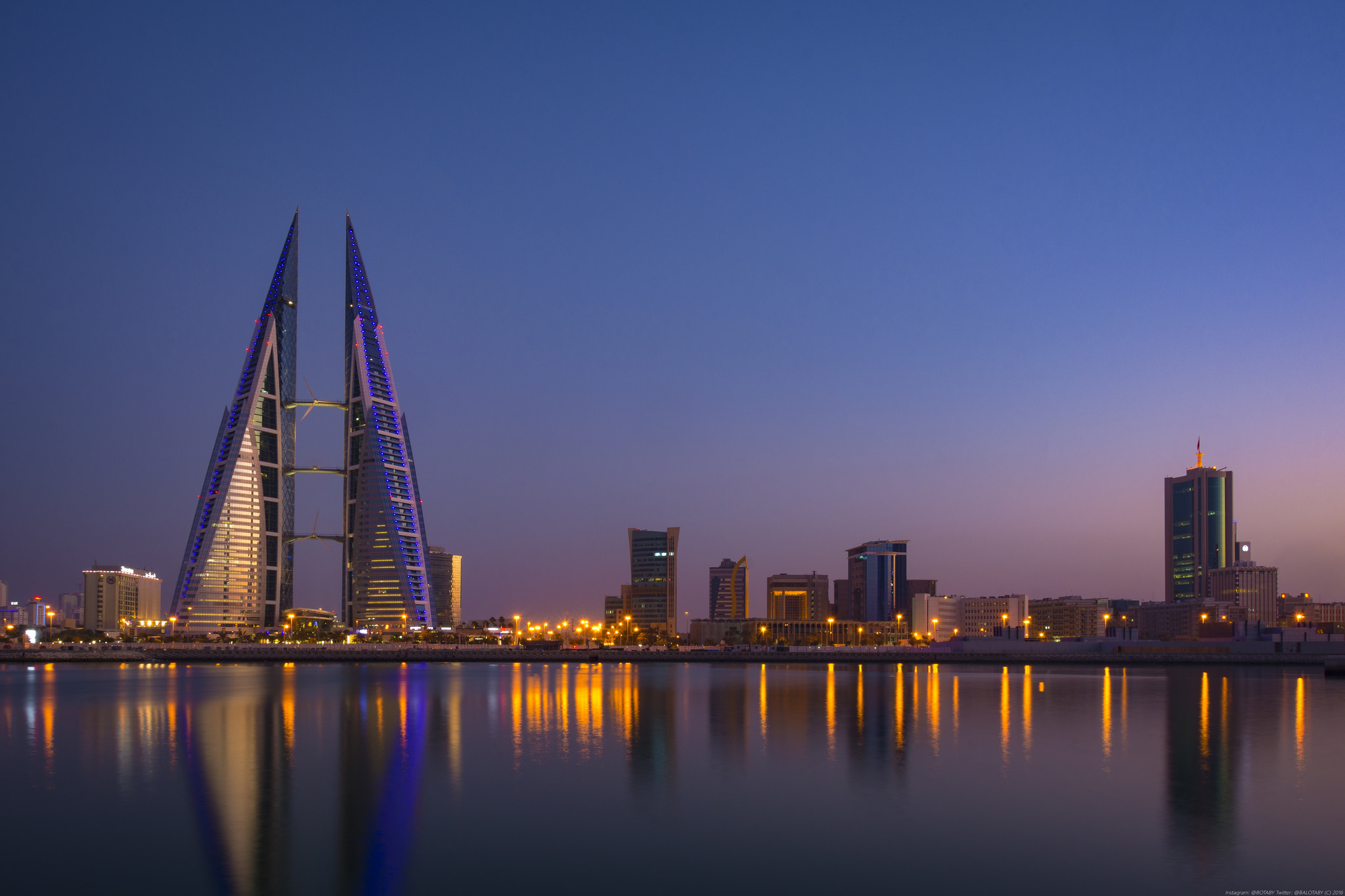
Night view of the Central Business District area in Manama and Bahrain World Trade Center.

The Central Business District (CBD) is an area in central Manama, the capital of Bahrain. It lies along the city's northern coastline and is one of Manama's main commercial districts, containing a concentration of hotels, office buildings, shops and restaurants.

The CBD is one of Manama's main shopping areas. The historic Bab Al Bahrain ("Gate of Bahrain") stands in Customs Square in the central business district and marks the main entrance to Manama Souq, a traditional market located directly behind the gate. The souq is known for stalls selling spices, fabrics, clothing, handicrafts, gold, jewellery, nuts and other goods.

Location of the Central Business District in Bahrain

The district contains several of Bahrain's landmark skyscrapers, including the Bahrain World Trade Center and Bahrain Financial Harbour. Bahrain Financial Harbour is described as one of the kingdom’s main centres for the financial sector and hosts regional and international financial institutions in its twin office towers and associated commercial complex. The Bahrain World Trade Center, a 240-metre, 50-storey twin-tower complex on the King Faisal Highway, is also regarded as one of the tallest and most prominent buildings in Manama’s financial area.

Moda Mall is a luxury shopping centre located on the ground floor of the Bahrain World Trade Center. It is marketed as one of Bahrain’s dedicated luxury shopping destinations and is home to a large portfolio of high-end international brands, with around 160 designer and luxury retail outlets.

== See also ==
- Central business district
- Culture of Bahrain
- Manama
- List of tallest structures in Bahrain
