= Culture of Bahrain =

The culture of Bahrain is part of the historical region of Eastern Arabia. Thus, Bahrain's culture is similar to that of its Arab neighbours in the Persian Gulf region. Bahrain is known for its cosmopolitanism, Bahraini citizens are very ethnically diverse. Though the state religion is Islam, the country is tolerant towards other religions: Catholic and Orthodox churches, Hindu temples as well as a (now-defunct) Jewish synagogue are present on the island.

== People and heritage ==
Bahraini people are ethnically diverse. There are at least 8–9 different ethnic groups of Bahraini citizens. Shia Bahraini citizens are divided into two main ethnic groups: Bahrani and Ajam. Most Shia Bahrainis are ethnic Baharna, the Baharna being descendants of the original pre-Islamic inhabitants of Bahrain. The Baharna speak a variety of Arabic known as Bahrani Arabic. The Ajam are ethnic Persian Shias. They maintain a distinct culture and language, and they have greatly influenced the Bahraini culture.

Among Sunni Bahraini citizens, there are also many different ethnic groups. Sunni Bahrainis are mainly divided into two main ethnic groups: urban Arabs (al Arab) and Huwala. The urban Arabs are mostly descendants of Sunni Arabs from central Arabia who were (alongside the baharna) traditionally pearl-divers, merchants, sailors, traders and fishermen in the pre-oil era. The Huwala are descendants of Sunni Iranians; some of them are ethnic Persians, and others are ethnic Sunni Arabs.

In addition to these native Bahraini ethnic groups, there are also ethnic Afro-Arabs, and Balochis. Bahraini Balochis are descendants of ethnic Baloch from Baluchistan. Most Bahrainis of African origin come from east Africa and have traditionally lived in Muharraq island and Riffa. Indian Bahrainis are mostly descendants of wealthy Indian merchants from the pre-oil era, known as the Bania. A smaller group of Sunni Bahraini citizens are descendants of naturalized Palestinian refugees and other Levant Arab immigrants.

Just around half of the population are Arabs. Foreign-born inhabitants, comprising more than half of the population, are mostly from Iran, India, Pakistan, Philippines, Britain, and the United States. About three-fifths of the largely Asian labor force is foreign.

The population is mostly Muslim and includes both the Sunni and Shia sects. Bahrain also has the largest Christian minority within the Arab states of the Arabian Gulf. Thousand Christians hold Bahraini citizenship, with the next closest GCC country, Kuwait, only having approximately 400 Christian citizens. Arabic is the official language of Bahrain, however, English is widely used as a lingua franca. The Ajami dialect of Persian is widely spoken by Persian Bahraini citizens Ajam. Many Bahrainis have a working knowledge not only of English but Hindi and Urdu as well.

Football (soccer) is the most popular modern sport, while traditional pastimes such as horse riding, and gazelle and hare hunting are still practiced by wealthier Bahrainis.

Traditional handicraft industries enjoy state and popular support. The Bahrain National Museum in Manama contains local artifacts dating from antiquity, such as ivory figurines, pottery, copper articles, and gold rings, many of which reflect various cultural influences from outside Bahrain. There is also a small but flourishing avant-garde art community.

=== Traditional dresses ===
The traditional Bahraini woman dress is an abaya, a long loose-fitting black gown, worn along with a black cloth on the head called the hijab.

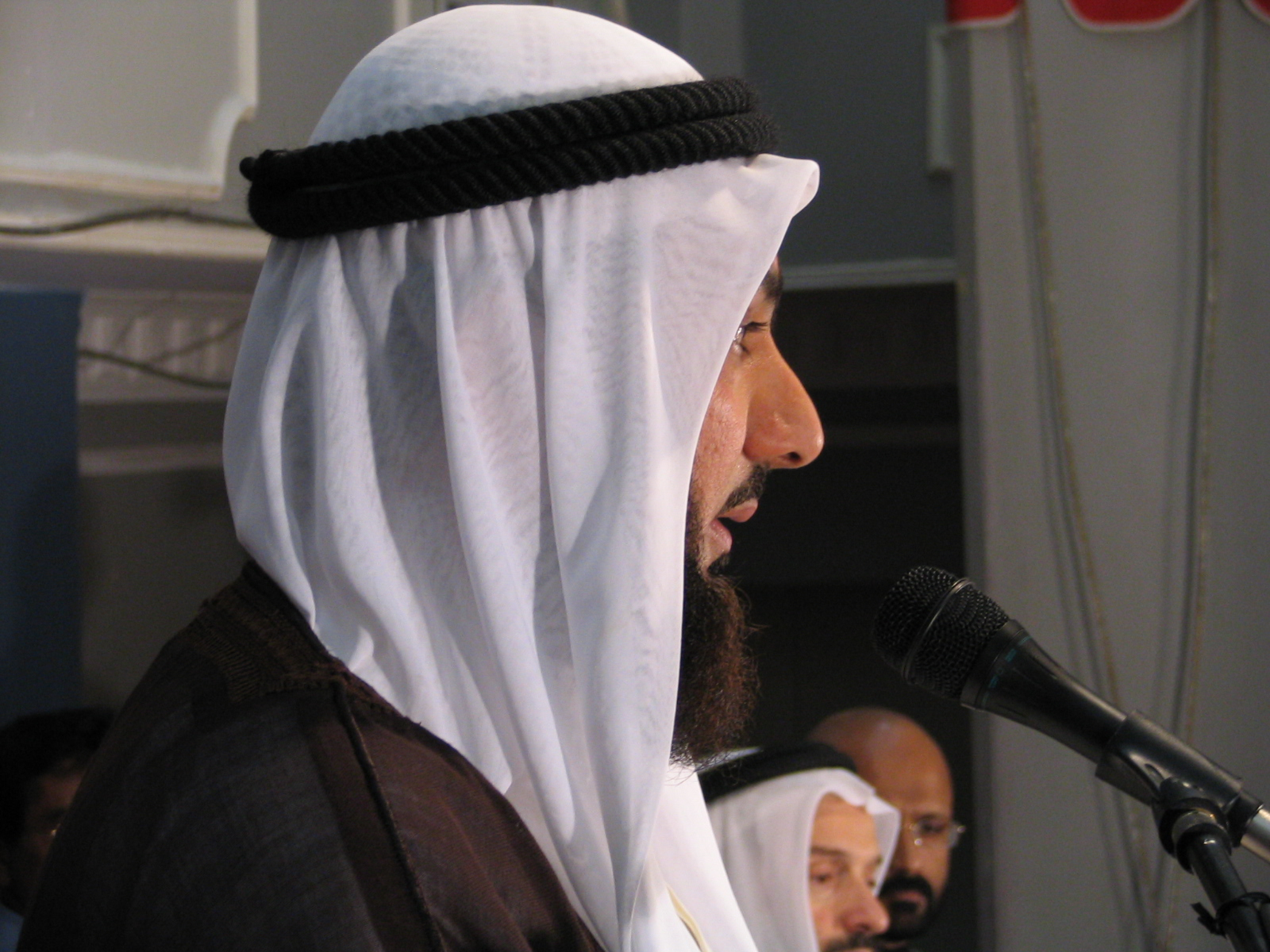
Bahraini man wearing the ghutra and agal

Bahraini men's traditional dress is the thobe (ثوب) and the traditional headdress which includes the keffiyeh, ghutra and agal.

The thobe (or 'dishdasha' in Kuwaiti) is a loose, long-sleeved, ankle-length garment. Summer thobes are white and made of cotton and winter thobes are black and made of wool.

The ghutra is a square scarf, made of cotton, and is folded in a triangle and worn over the keffiyeh. In Bahrain, it is usually red and white checked or all white. There is no significance placed on which kind the man wears in Bahrain, although this selection has implications in other Persian Gulf countries.

The keffiyeh is a white knitted skull cap worn under the ghutra.

The agal is a thick, double, black cord that is worn on the top of the ghutra to hold it in place.

In some occasions, Bahrainis wear a bisht, which is a cloak made of wool, over the thobe. Unlike the thobe, the bisht is soft, and it is usually black, brown, or grey.

=== Gargee'an ===
Garqee'an is a biannual celebration observed in Bahrain and rest of Eastern Arabia, that takes place on the 15th night of the Islamic month of Sha'ban and on the 15th night of Ramadan. It is marked with children dressing in traditional attire and going door-to-door to receive nuts and sweets from neighbours, whilst also singing traditional songs. The tradition has existed for hundreds of years and deeply rooted in Gulf culture.

Although the celebration of Garqee'an shares superficial similarities with the Halloween custom of trick-or-treating, practiced in some Western countries, it has no connection with horror and no associated origin with Halloween.

== Media ==
Several weekly and daily papers are published in Arabic: Akhbar Al Khaleej, Al Ayam, Al Waqt to name a few. Al-Wasat daily Arabic newspaper is thought to have become the country's most popular newspaper by 2011 with a daily circulation of 15,000 and readership of 45,000 to 60,000. A small number of newspapers appear in English: Gulf Daily News, Daily Tribune. Most of the press is privately owned and is not subject to censorship as long as it refrains from criticizing the ruling family. The state television and radio stations broadcast most programs in Arabic: there are channels in English and Hindi (radio) as well. A new digital publishing company that has been gaining attention with tourists, expats, and young Bahraini residents is LocalBH with content ranging from tourist attractions, entertainment and up to date events in Bahrain.

== Arts, music and dance ==
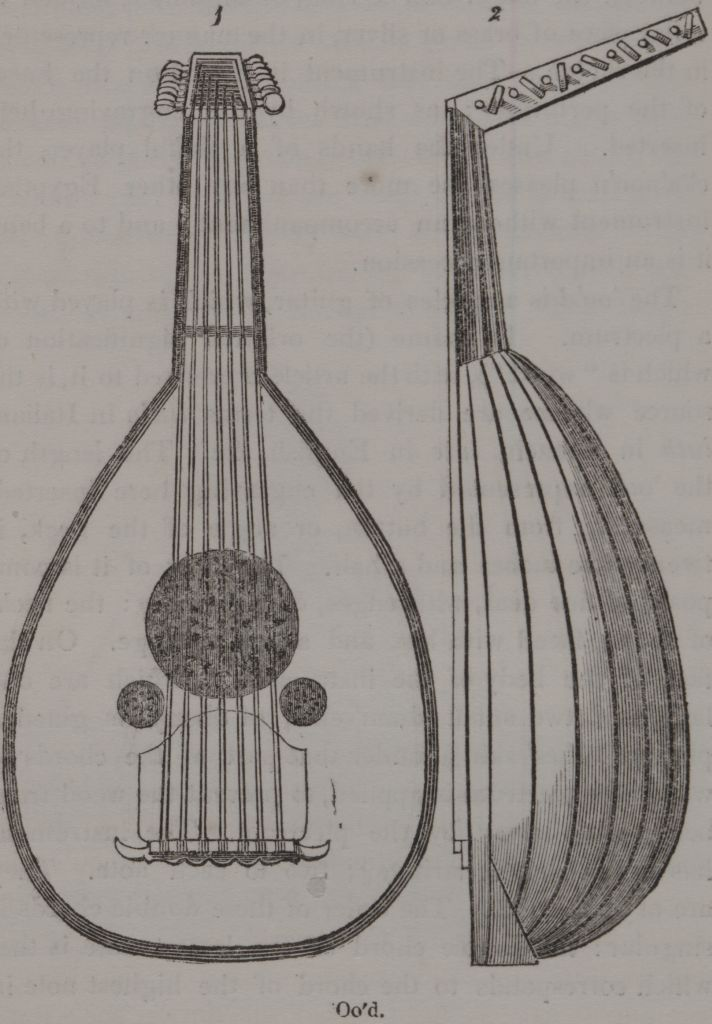
Outline of the oud

Arts include readings of the Quran, ceremonial dances accompanied by flat drums, and storytelling. The poets of Bahrain are famous for their poetic verses and carry on established traditions while also exploring new themes. Births and marriages call for wide-scale celebrations in Bahrain. Apart from this, the people of Bahrain are also known for their artistic skills, the boats used for fishing and pearling being an example of this craftsmanship. The traditional jewelry also speaks volumes about the intricate designs that the people of Bahrain can come up with.

Khaleeji is a style of Arab folk music from the Persian Gulf area, played in Bahrain with polyrhythms. The style is strongly influenced by the music of Africa. The Bahraini pearl diving tradition is known for the songs called fidjeri. Fidjeri is a musical repertoire performed traditionally by male pearl divers of Bahrain. It involves singing, clapping, drums and dances with earthen water jars. Liwa is a type of music and dance performed mainly in communities which contain descendants of East Africans, such as Muharraq and Hidd.

The music of Bahrain follows the traditional mode. It is elaborate and repetitive. It is played on the oud (an ancestor of the lute) and the rebab (a one-stringed instrument). Bahrain also has a folk dance tradition. The ardha is a men's sword dance, which is accompanied by traditional drummers and a poet, who sings the lyrics.

A small number of feature films have been produced in the country; the first of which being the 1971 Disney film Hamad and the Pirates, which features notable landmarks such as the Bab Al Bahrain and Mina Salman. This was followed in 1990 by drama film The Barrier, directed by Bassam Al-Thawadi. Cinemas have been popular establishments since the early 1920s when a makeshift movie theater was formed.

== Festivals and customs ==
- Ashura
- Bahrain Independence Day
- Eid al-Fitr and Eid al-Adha
- Prophet's birthday
- Ramadan

== National Cultural Heritage Sites ==
Al Fateh Mosque; Al Khamis Mosque; Arad Fort; Bab Al Bahrain; Manama Souq; Gold Souq; Bahrain Fort	Bahrain National Museum; Barbar Temple; Beit Al Qur'an; Dilmun Burial Mounds; First Oil Well; Al Jasra House; Ain Umm Sujoor	National Theatre of Bahrain; Riffa Fort; Shaikh Isa's House; Siyadi House; Tree of Life; Jabal El Doka'an

== Places ==
- Museums in Bahrain

== Holidays ==
On 1 September 2006, Bahrain changed its weekend from being Thursdays and Fridays to Fridays and Saturdays, in order to have a day of the weekend shared with the rest of the world. Notable holidays in the country are listed below:

Date	English name	Local (Arabic) name	Description
1 January	New Year's Day	رأس السنة الميلادية	The Gregorian New Year's Day, celebrated by most parts of the world.
1 May	Labour Day	يوم العمال	Locally called "Eid Al Oumal" (Workers' Day), it is an annual holiday that celebrates the achievements of workers.
16 December	National Day	اليوم الوطني	National Day of Bahrain.
17 December	Accession Day	يوم الجلوس	Accession Day for the late Amir Sh. Isa bin Salman Al Khalifa
1st Muharram	Islamic New Year	رأس السنة الهجرية	Islamic New Year (also known as: Hijri New Year).
9th, 10th Muharram	Day of Ashura	عاشوراء	Commemorates the martyrdom of Imam Hussein.
12th Rabiul Awwal	Prophet Muhammad's birthday	المولد النبوي	Commemorates Prophet Muhammad's birthday, celebrated in most parts of the Muslim world.
1st, 2nd, 3rd Shawwal	Little Feast	عيد الفطر	Commemorates end of Ramadan.
9th Zulhijjah	Arafat Day	يوم عرفة	Commemoration of Muhammad's final sermon and completion of the message of Islam.
10th, 11th, 12th Zulhijjah	Feast of the Sacrifice	عيد الأضحى	Commemorates Ebrahim's willingness to sacrifice his son. Also known as the Big Feast (celebrated from the 10th to 13th).

== See also ==
- Culture of the Arab States of the Arabian Gulf
