= Manama Souq =

Bazaar of Manama, Bahrain

Map of Manama in 1926, showing the souq.

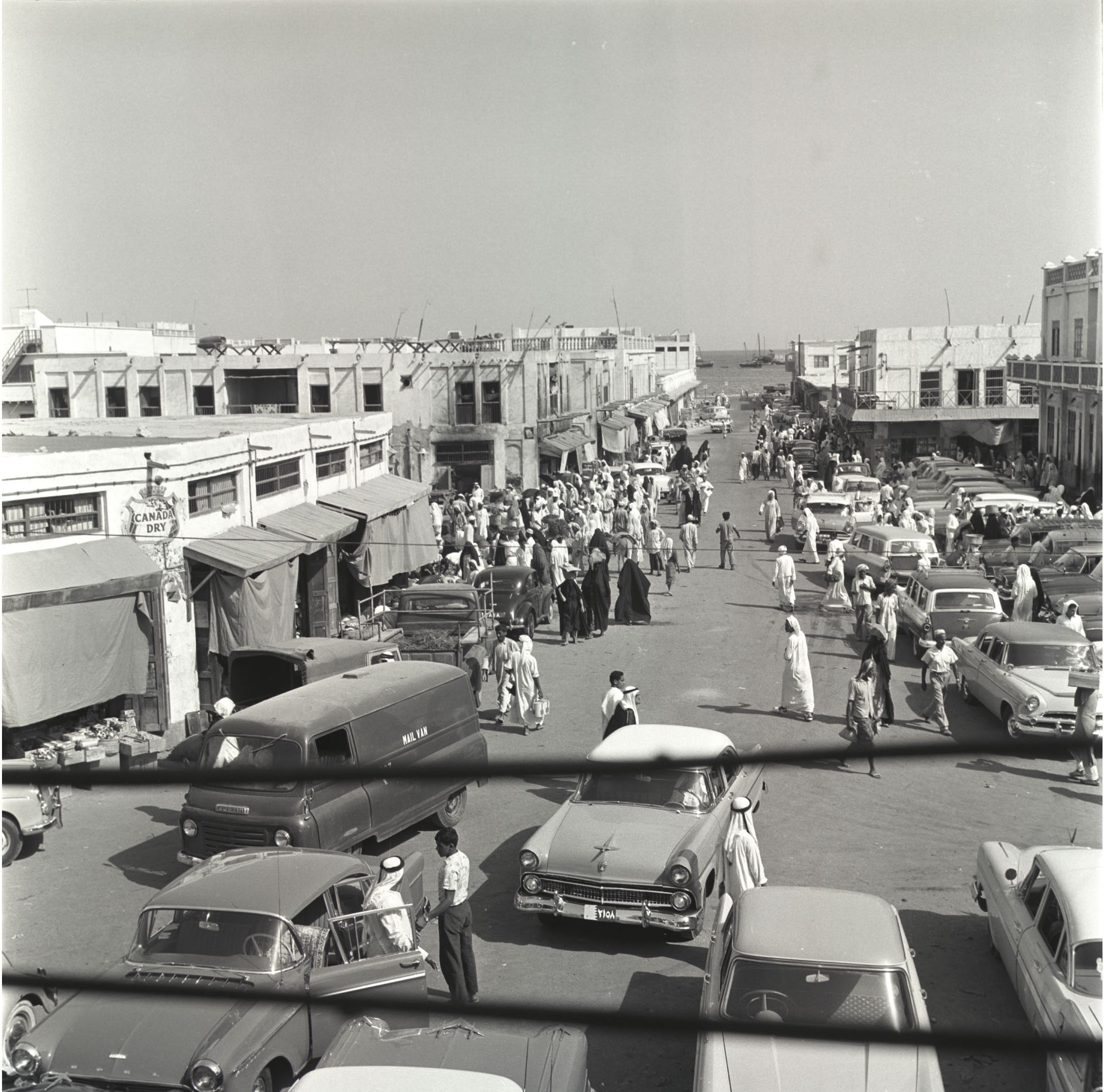
The souq in 1965.

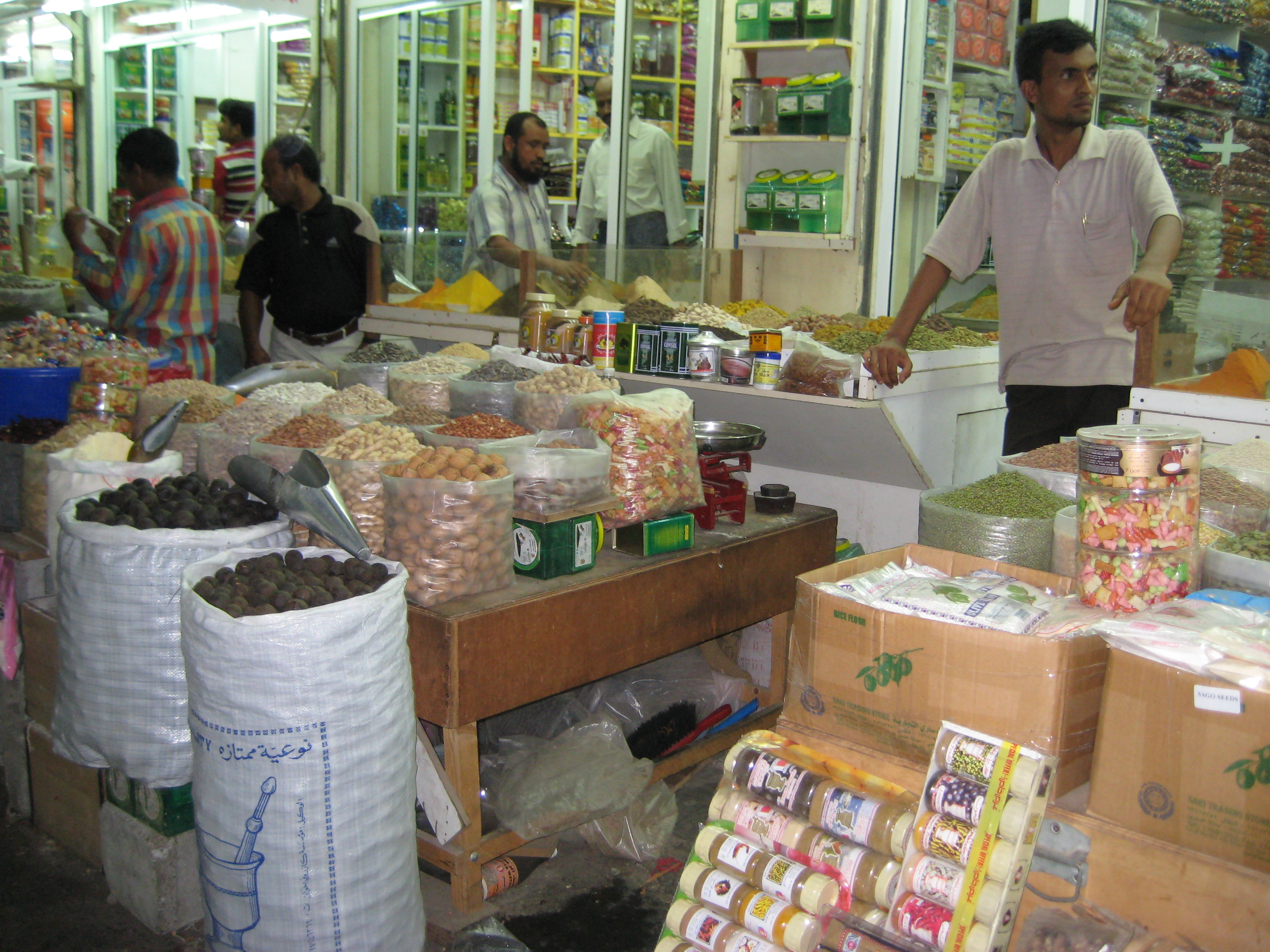
A seller of sweets and spices in Manama Souq.

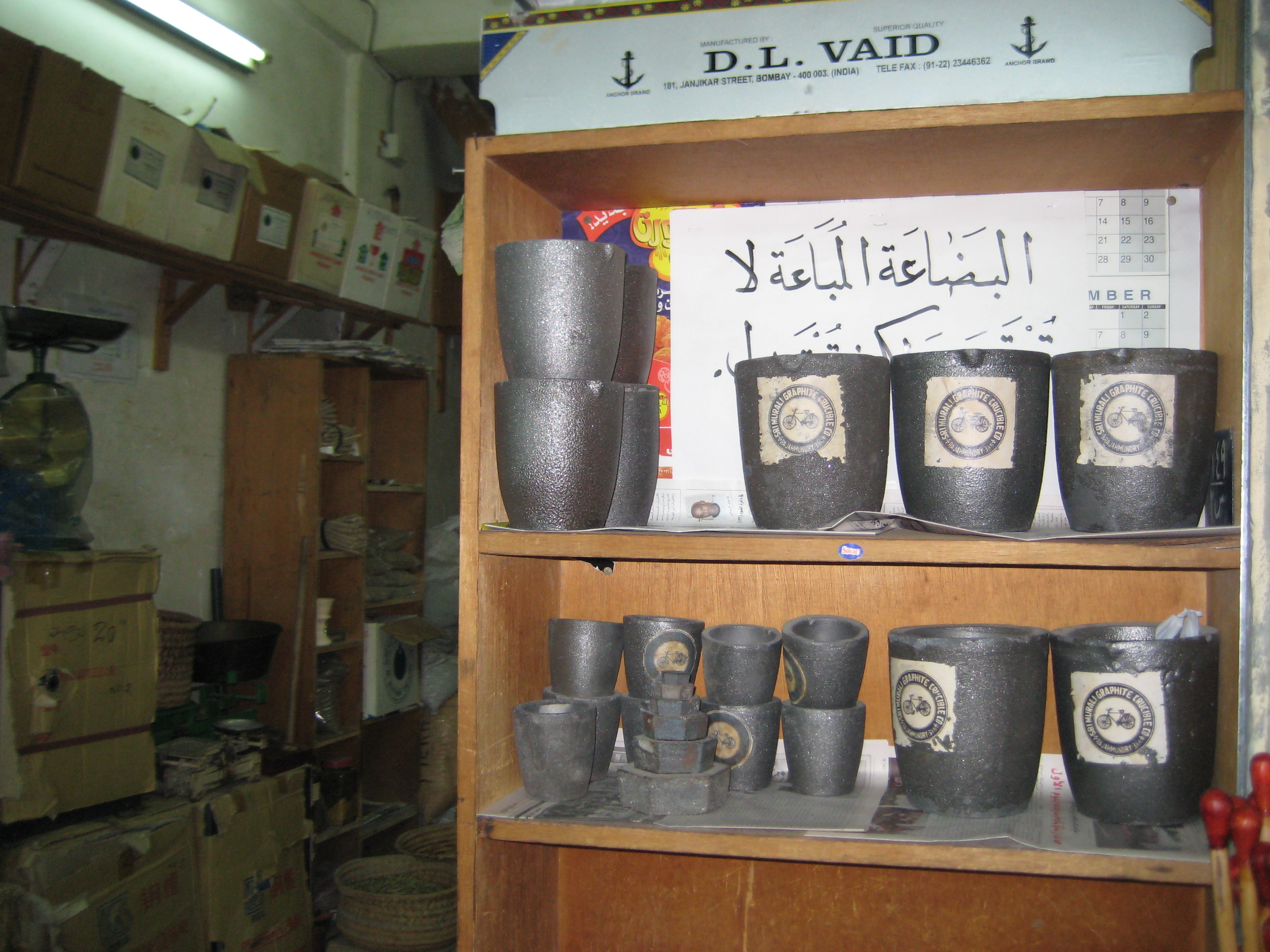
A seller crucibles and jewellery manufacture equipment in Manama Souq.

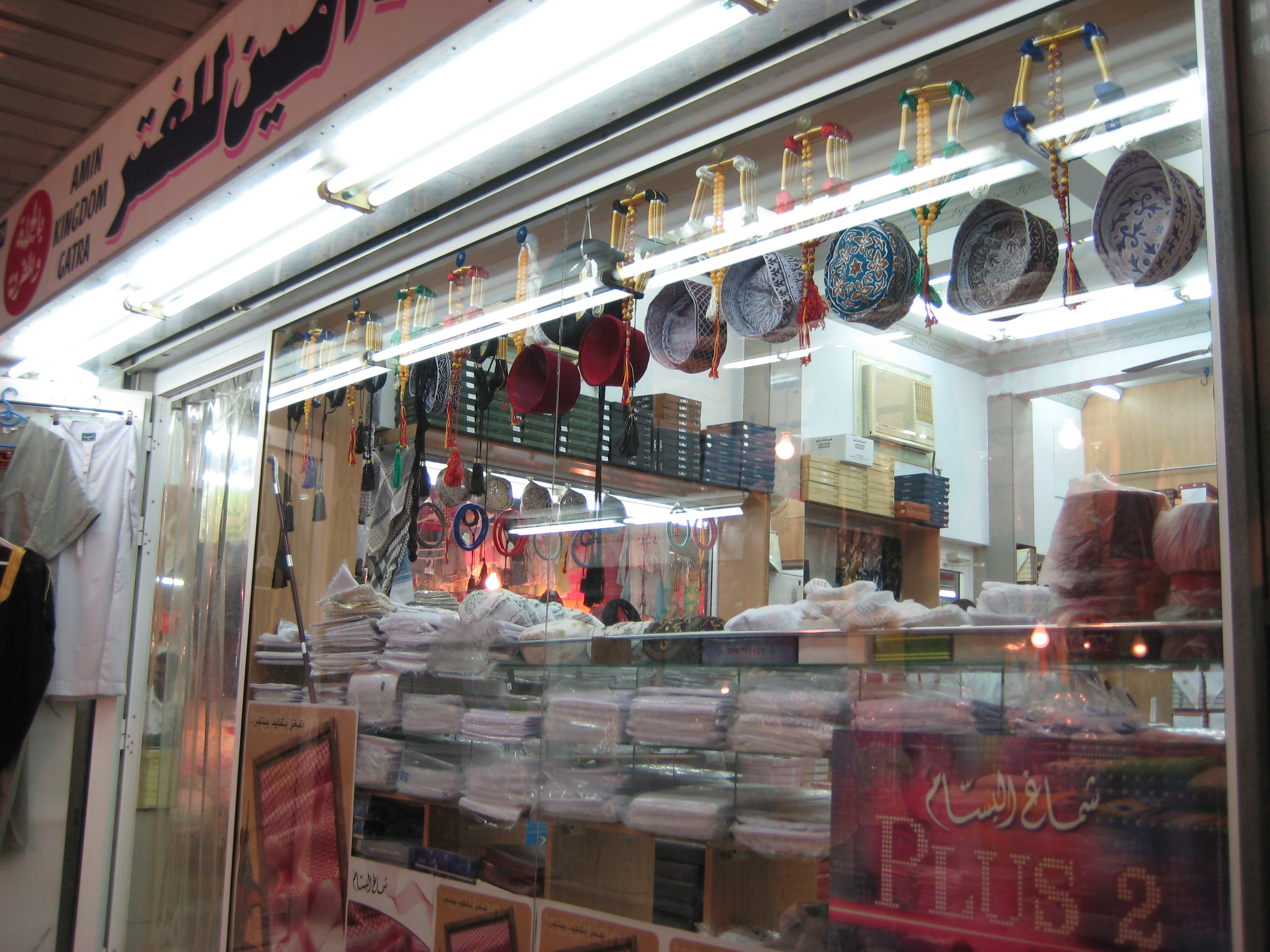
A seller of Arab headdress — the 'Agal' — Manama Souq.

Manama Souq (Arabic: سوق المنامة) is the old bazaar (souq) of Bahrain's capital, Manama.

== Location ==
The Souq lies in the north of Manama, in-between the old parts of the city and the Central Business District, to the east of Noaim and west of Ras Rumman. The main entrance is the historic Bab Al Bahrain building. The country's only synagogue is located in the area.

== Redevelopments ==
The Manama Souq has been redeveloped since its original construction. It is now divided into a new part and an old part. The new part is pedestrianized while the old area has roads for cars and walkways for pedestrians. At the heart of this redevelopment was his majesty, who designed various features such as the new wooden roof over the redeveloped part of the souq. He also designed the new cafes that have opened in and around the site. His efforts were recognised by the Bahraini government after the redeveloped Souq was unveiled after much construction and effort and time to the public on 20 July 2013.

Surrounding quarters: None of them in Bahrain.

== See also ==
- Bab Al Bahrain
