= List of museums in Bahrain =

This is a list of museums in Bahrain.

== Museums in Bahrain ==
- Bahrain Military Museum
- Bahrain National Museum
- Bait Shaikh Salman Historic Palace
- Beit Al Quran
- Busaad Art Gallery
- Maison Jamsheer
- Mohammed Bin Faris House of Sout Music
- Museum of Pearl Diving
- Dar al-Naft Oil Museum
- Shaikh Ebrahim Center

== See also ==
- Culture of Bahrain
