= Ain Umm Sujoor =

Ain Umm Sujoor عين أم السجور
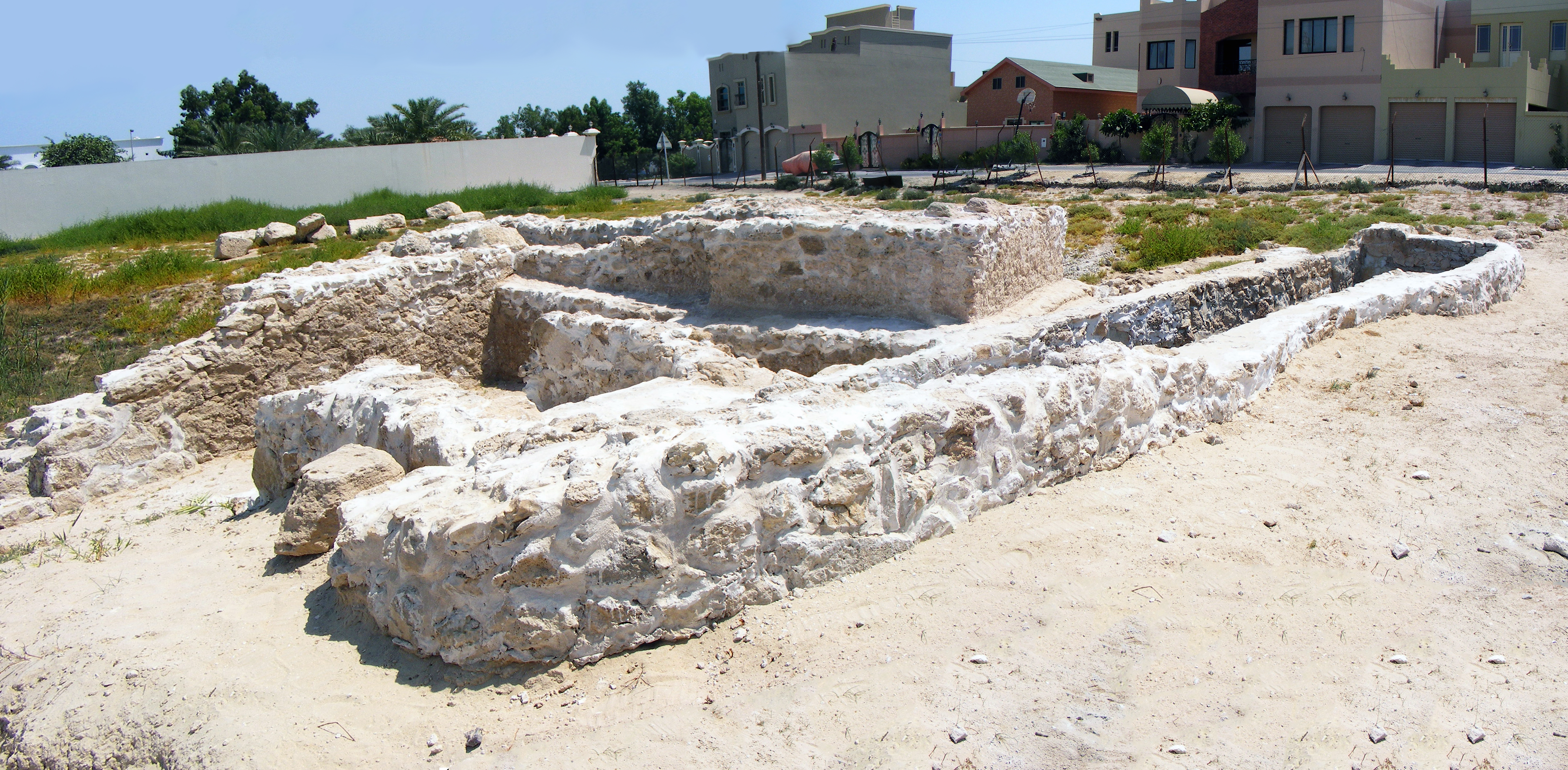
- The spring.

- Location in Bahrain
- Coordinates: 26°13′18.32″N 50°28′12.53″E
- Country: Bahrain
- Governorate: Northern Governorate

The Ain Umm Sujoor (Arabic: عين أم السجور) is an archaeological site located in the village of Diraz, Bahrain. Believed to have been built during the 3rd millennium BC, the site consists of an oval hollow, approximately 60x30 meters, with two wells, several rooms and ovens. It has been largely neglected in recent times.

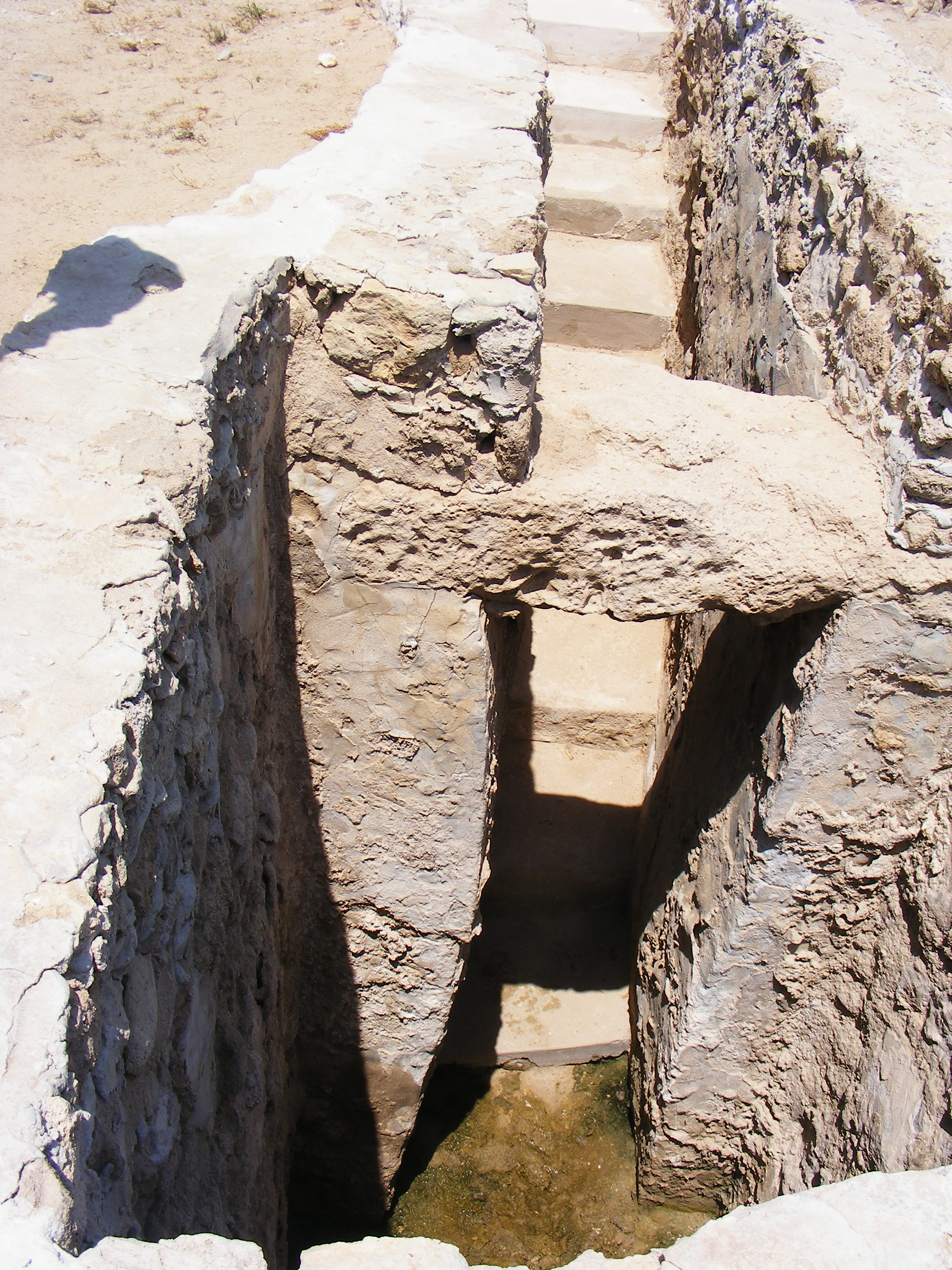
Restored remains of the well

== Etymology ==
The name of the well, Ain Umm Sujoor, translates from Arabic to 'Mother of the spring of overflowing waters'.

== History ==
The water wells date back to 3rd millennium BCE to the Dilmun period; rooms and ovens, located on the southern side of the wells, are believed to be later additions. The well on the north is called holy well, or water temple, which is named after discovering that a part of the structure was used to show peoples’ gratitude to their Gods for water. The wells and the pool is believed to be a later addition.

=== Excavations ===
The site has been excavated by the Danish and Japanese expeditions in 1954 and 1990s respectively. The Japanese team originated from Rikkyo University and discovered Wells 2 and 3 in addition to Well 1, and were the first to suggest the wells were holy places.

== See also ==
- Archaeological sites in Bahrain
- Culture of Bahrain
