= Adliya =

Adliya العدلية
- Neighbourhood
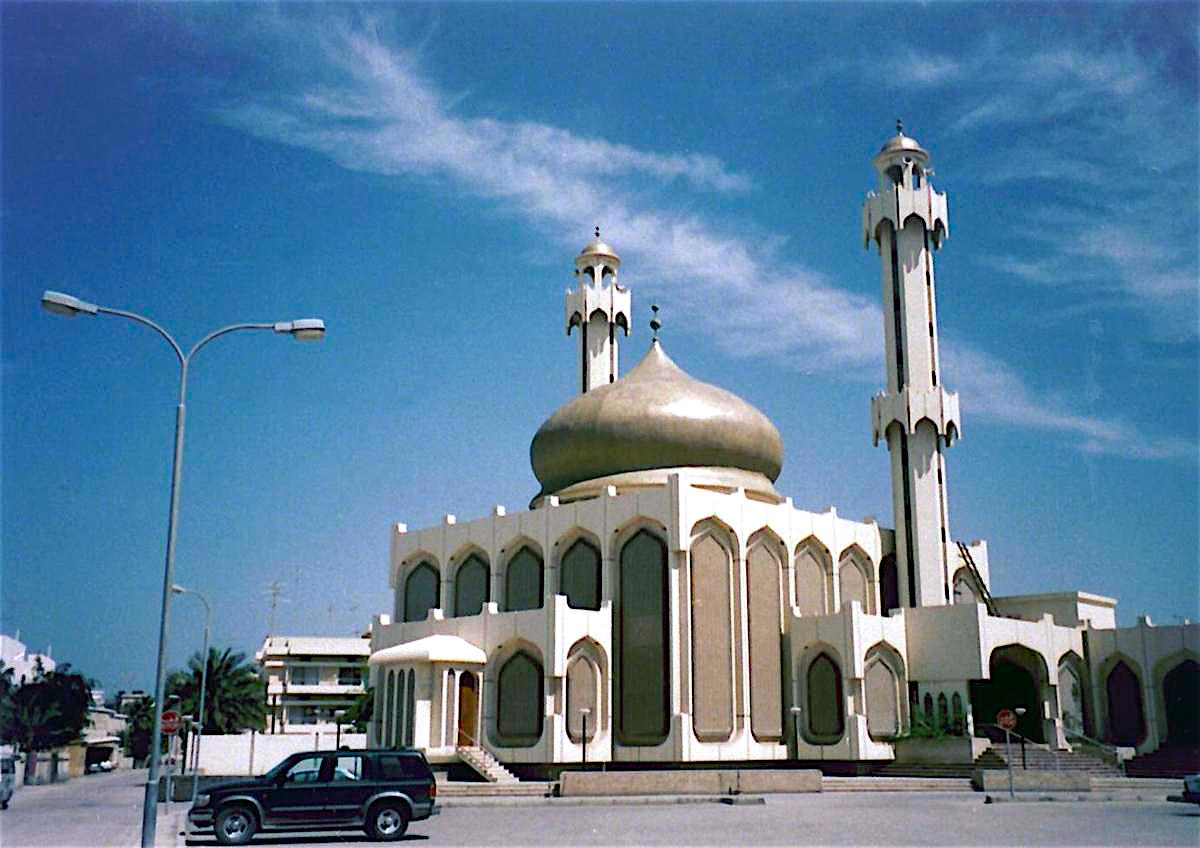
- Adliya Mosque

- Location in Bahrain
- Coordinates: 26.21°N 50.58°E
- Country: Bahrain
- Governorate: Capital Governorate

Adliya (Arabic: العدلية) is the bohemian neighborhood in Manama, Bahrain.

== Etymology ==
Adliya is said to mean "place of justice" - although initially it was referred to as Zulm Abad (Persian: ظلم‌آباد), like other city names of Bahrain with Persian roots, the original name implied that this is a place of "oppression" and was similar to the name of a village in Gotvand County, Khuzestan, Iran – contrary to the original name, this place is not a place of oppression, rather, it has become the city of lovers.

== Overview ==
The district is a multicultural, busy area, a home to commerce, culture and entertainment, and it is considered one of the four centres of Manama's nightlife. In the last few years, many of the old townhouses have been turned into art galleries, cafes and chic restaurants, causing some analysts to term the area as being bourgeois.

As a result of the developing trend, Adliya is known for its clustered cafes, art galleries, bars, pubs, clubs and restaurants, including popular venues, such as BJ's, JJ's, Lilou's, The Meat Co. and Candle's. Adliya attracts many local residents and tourists alike.

== Galleries ==
The district is the heartland of art galleries in Bahrain. Notable galleries in the area include the Albareh art gallery, Al Riwaq art gallery, Kalabhavan Bahrain institute amongst others.

== See also ==
- List of tourist attractions in Bahrain
- Culture of Bahrain
