= List of archaeological sites in Bahrain =

Map showing the locations of the ancient burial mounds.

There are multiple archaeological sites in Bahrain. Bahrain is an island country in the Persian Gulf consisting of a small archipelago centred around Bahrain Island. It is believed to be the location of the Dilmun civilisation, dating back to the 4th millennium BC. There are two archaeological sites that were recognized as UNESCO World Heritage Sites - the Bahrain Fort and the Dilmun Burial Mounds.

== List ==
The following is a list of notable archaeological sites in the country:

- Ain Umm Sujoor
- Barbar Temple
- Bu Maher Fort
- Dilmun Burial Mounds
- Diraz Temple
- Khamis Mosque
- Qal'at al-Bahrain
- Riffa Fort

== Gallery ==
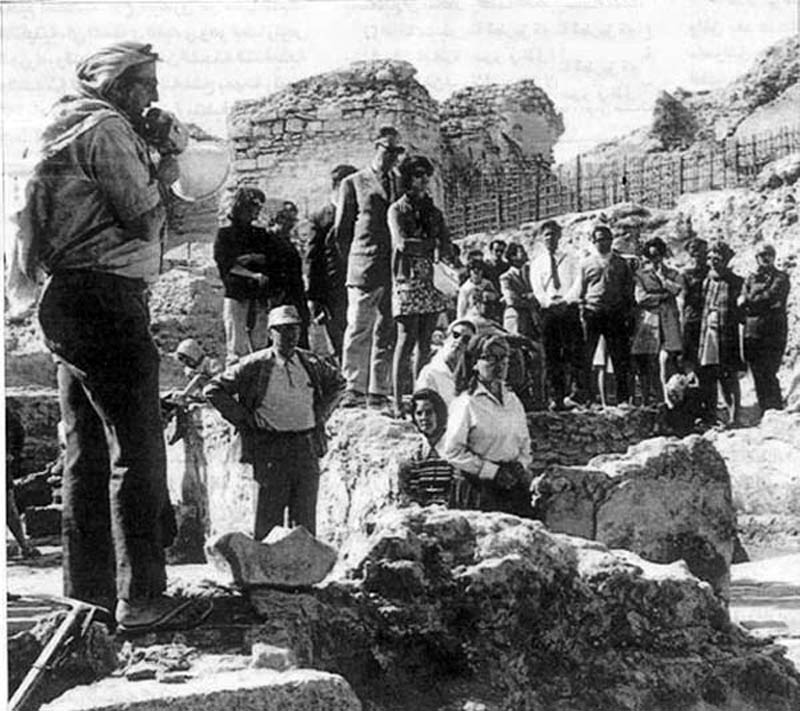
Danish archaeological expedition to Bahrain Fort

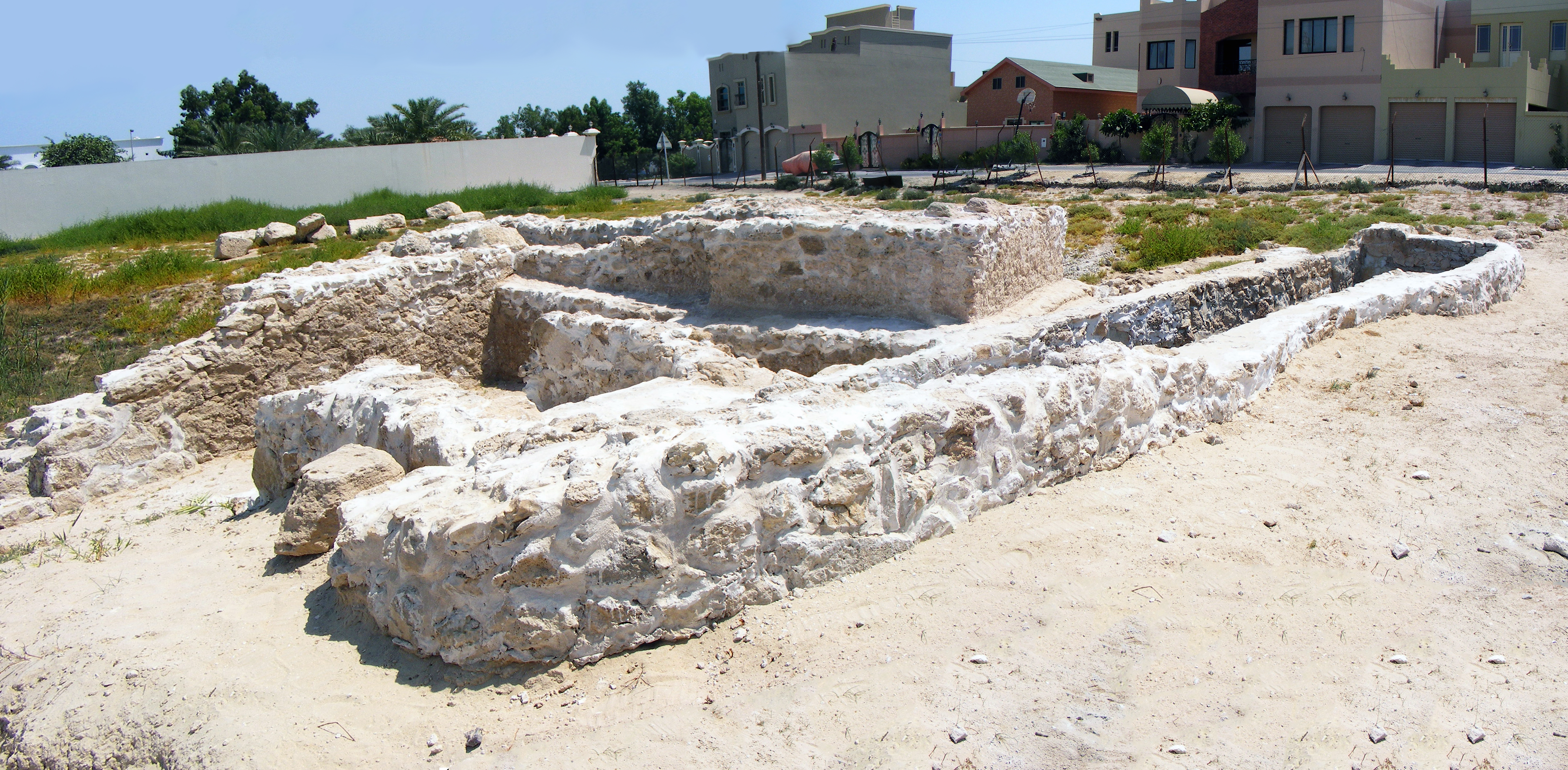
Ain Umm Sujoor

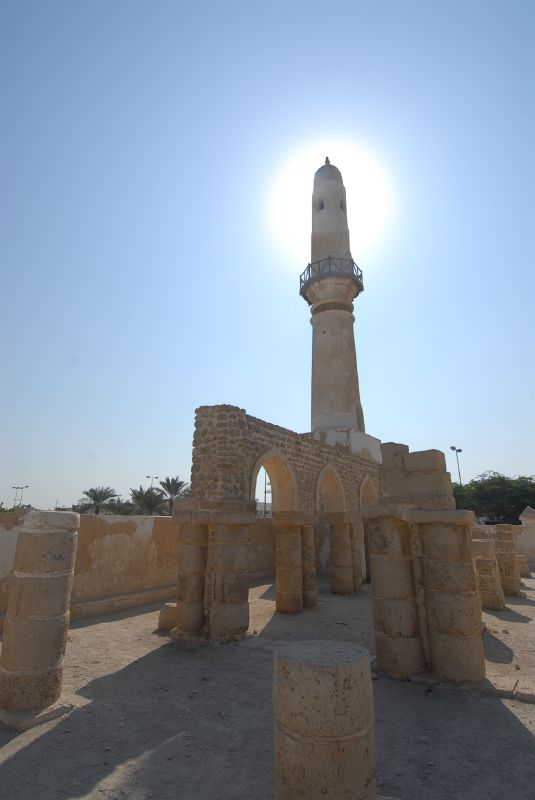
Khamis Mosque

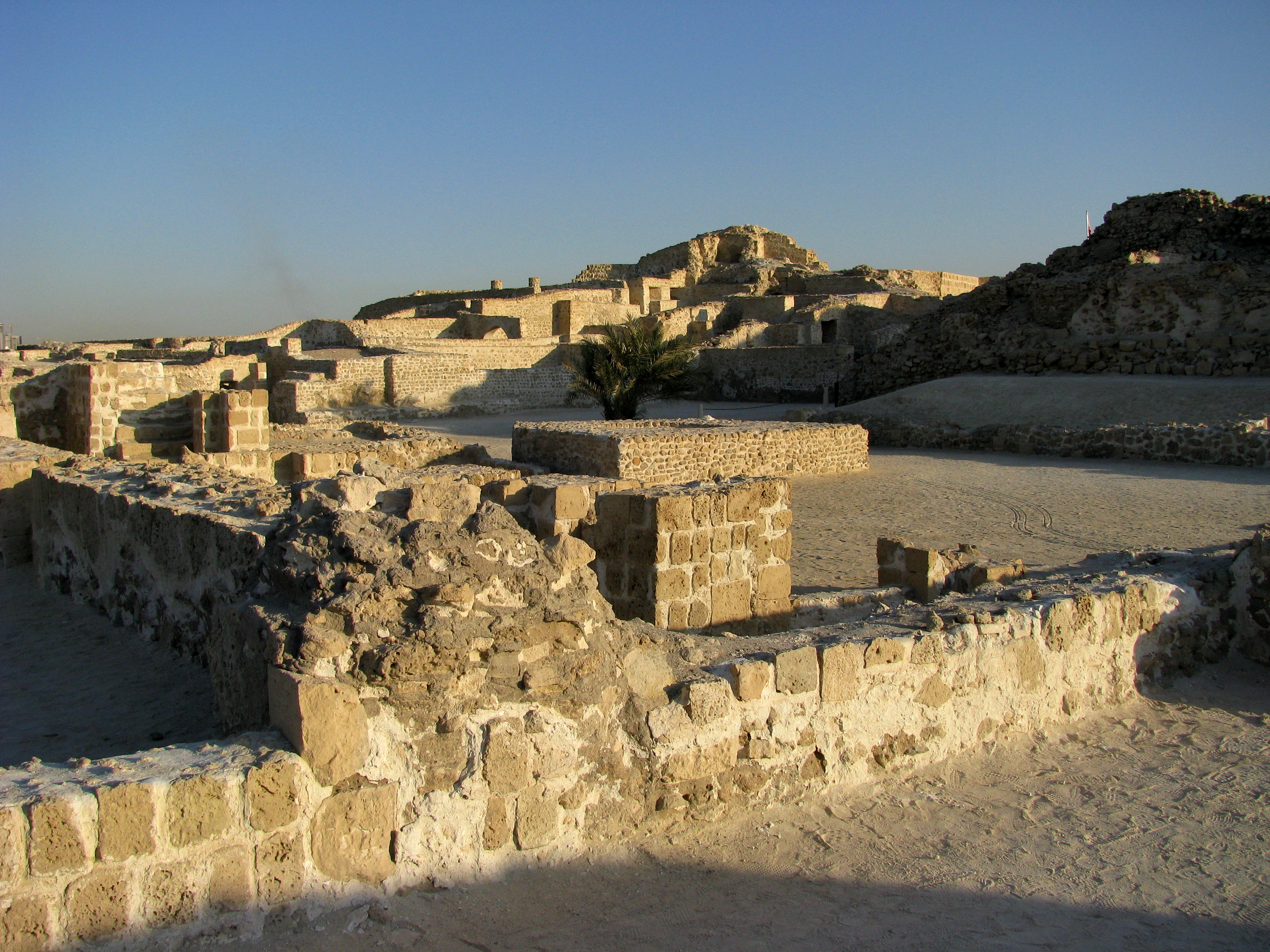
Bahrain Fort

Riffa Fort

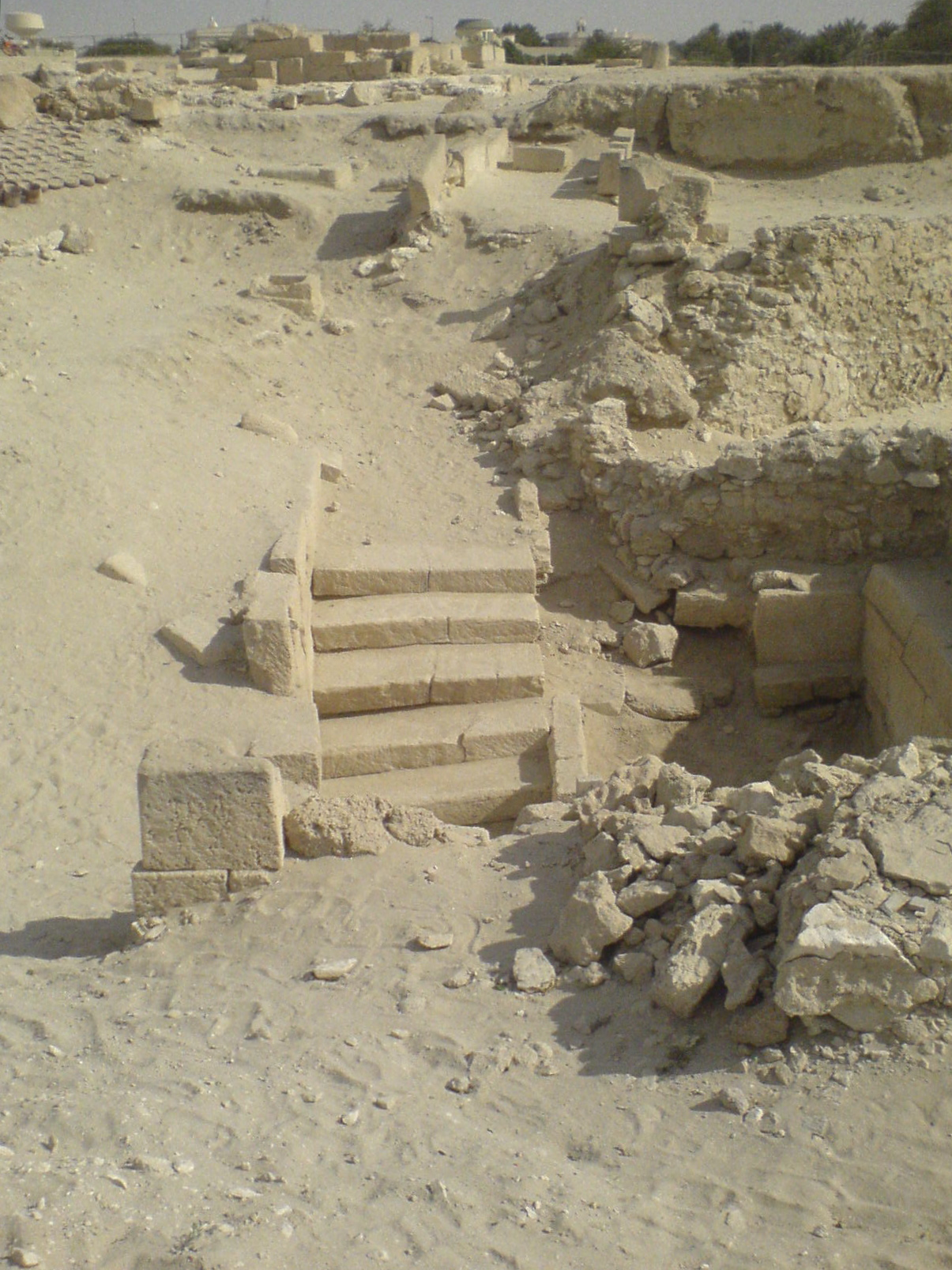
Barbar Temple

== See also ==
- History of Bahrain
