= Bab Al Bahrain =

Historical building in Manama, Bahrain

Coordinates: 26.234726°N 50.574661°E

- باب البحرين
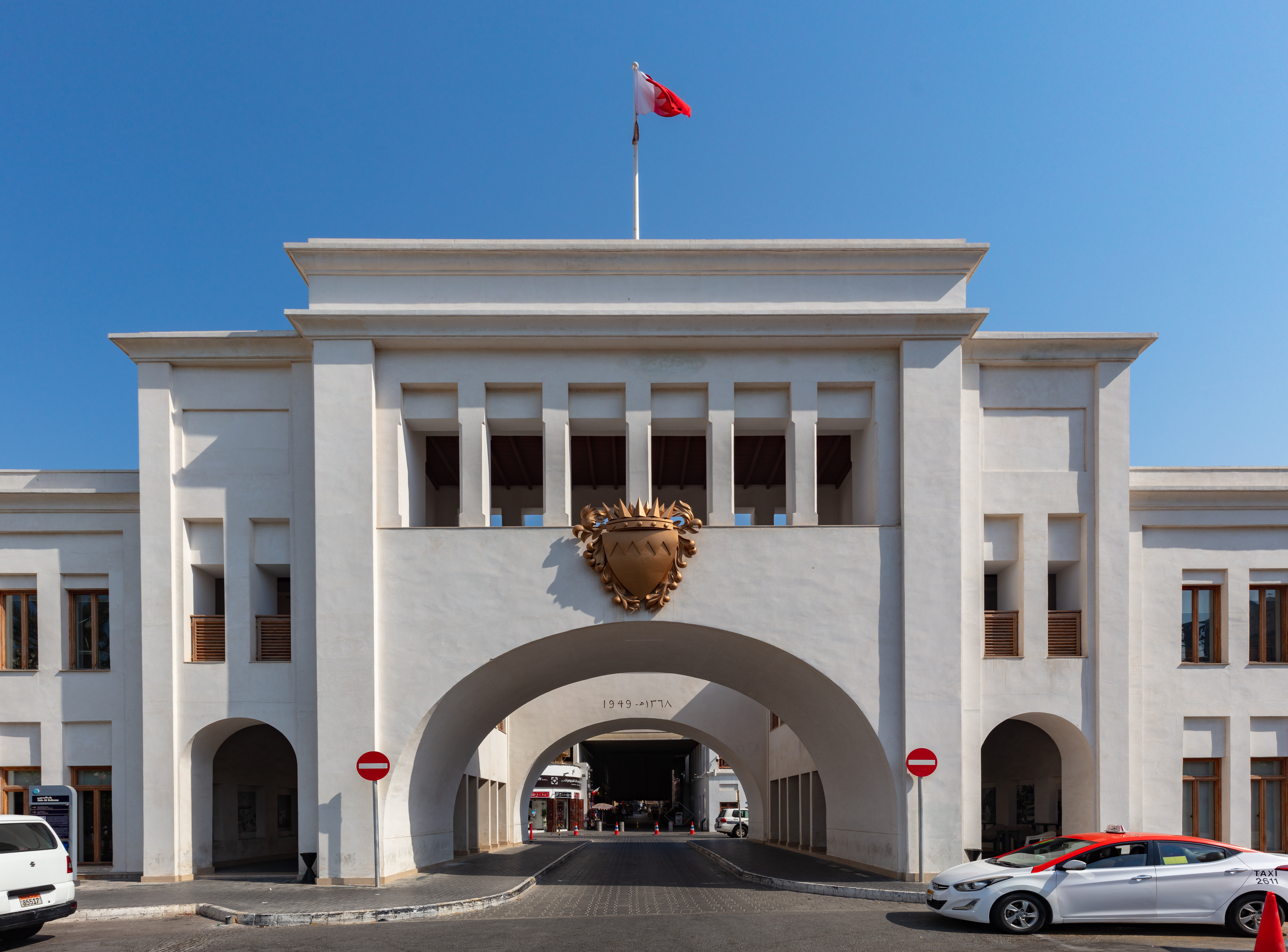
- Interactive map of the Bab Al Bahrain area
- Etymology: Gateway of Bahrain

General information
- Status: Completed
- Type: Administrative
- Location: Central Business District, Manama, Bahrain
- Opened: 1949

Website
- Official website

Bab Al Bahrain (Arabic: باب البحرين, translitered Bāb al-Baḥrayn meaning Gateway of Bahrain) is a historical building located in the Customs Square in the central business district of Manama. It marks the main entrance to the Manama Souq.

Opened in 1949 and designed by the British adviser to the emir, Charles Belgrave, Bab Al Bahrain once stood on the Manama coastline. Due to extensive land reclamation in the later half of the 20th century, the structure is now several kilometres inland. The square is considered to be the region's first formal public space.

== Location ==
The building is situated on Government Avenue in Manama. It lies adjacent to the King Faisal Highway that leads to the causeway connecting the country to the Kingdom of Saudi Arabia. The Bahrain Financial Harbour and other landmarks are nearby.

== History ==
The monument itself was refurbished in 1986 to incorporate Islamic architectural features. In 2013, a complete new refurbishment of the facade and the interiors was made, the ground floor now houses the tourist information office and a handicrafts shop. Today the monument essentially consists of a huge arch, below which runs a road, which is often referred to as the entrance to the Manama souq (marketplace) and 2 sides arches are made for pedestrian. The building hosts several shops and cafes, including Naseef Cafe which was the first ice cream shop in the country.

Government Avenue, which runs in front of Bab Al Bahrain, contains many major banks and business establishments. Government Avenue is so named because the entire offices of the Bahrain government were once housed here. The Gold City (different from Gold Souq) is a shopping complex for gold ornaments and is also located on Government Avenue. The Indian jewellery retailer Alukkas has a branch in Gold City.

Bab al Bahrain is expected to serve as an interchange station for the 109km Bahrain Metro which is expected to be fully operational by 2030.

== Gallery ==
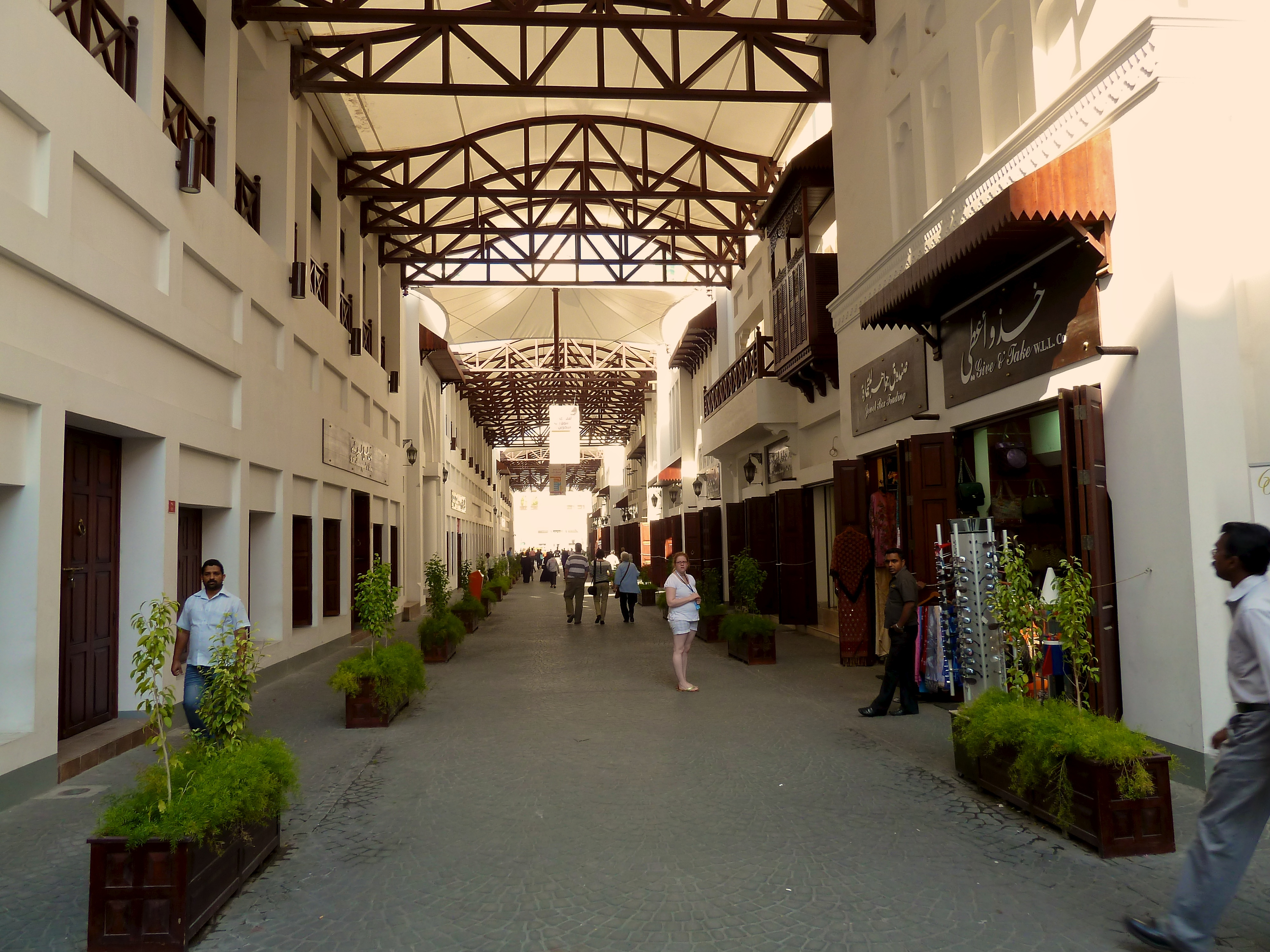
A pedestrian zone behind the building

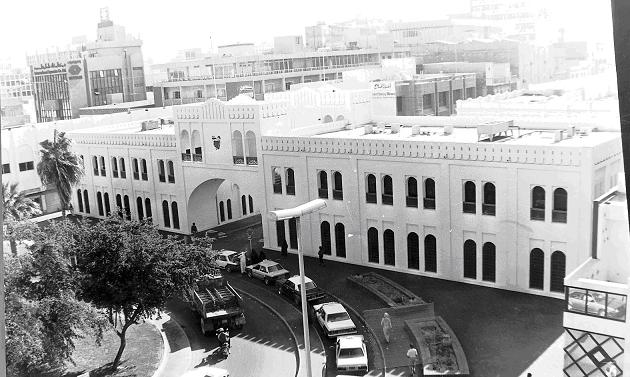
Bab Al Bahrain, unknown date

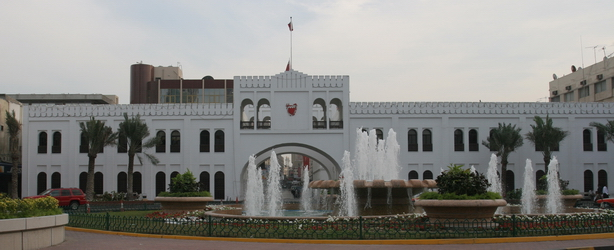
Bab Al Bahrain, from the front.

== See also ==
- Culture of Bahrain
- Tourism in Bahrain
- Manama
