= Riffa Fort =

Archaeological site in Bahrain

Coordinates: 26°07′04″N 50°33′46″E

- قلعة الرفاع (Arabic)
- Interactive map of Riffa Fort
- Location: Riffa, Bahrain

History
- Built: 1812-1818

Site notes
- Restored: 1993

Riffa Fort (Arabic: قلعة الرفاع, romanized: Qal'at ar-Rifa'), also known as Shaikh Salman bin Ahmed Fateh Fort or Qal'at ar-Riffa, is a fort in Riffa, Bahrain. The fort is situated on a cliff overlooked the desert valley between East Riffa and West Riffa.

== History ==
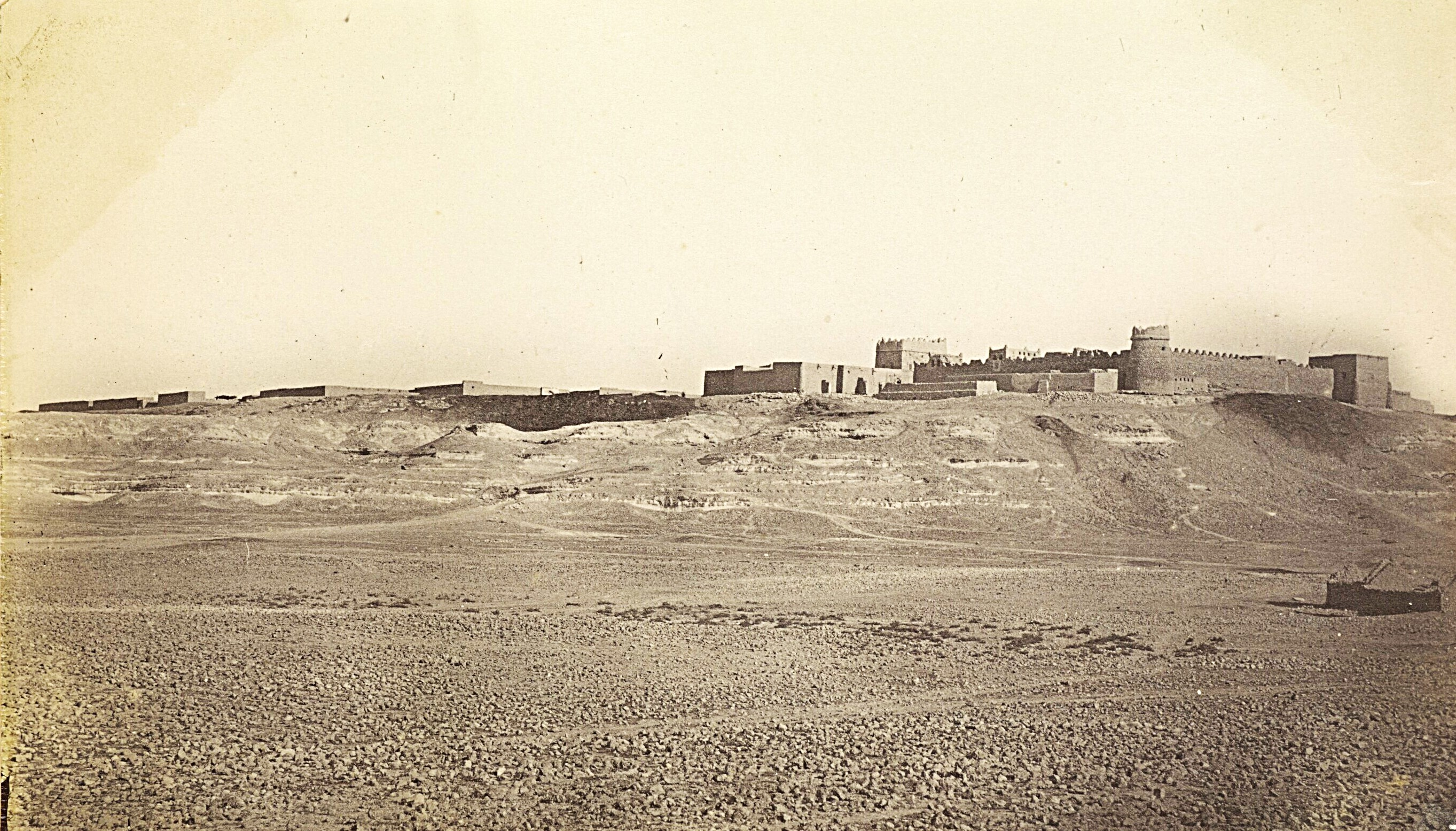
Riffa fort, circa 1870.

In the early 18th century, a fort was built here by Fareer bin Rahhal. Over time, the fort fell and only the foundation remained. Later, during the reign of Sheikh Salman bin Ahmed Al Fateh Al Khalifa, he rebuilt the fort using the existing foundation in 1812. The fort was used for defense and the residence of Shaikh Salman bin Al Fateh.

In the 19th century the fort was a residence for Sheikh Salman bin Ahmed Al Fateh and then it was inherited by his grand children. Sheikh Isa bin Ali Al Khalifa, who ruled Bahrain from 1869 to 1932, was born in this fort.

Inside Riffa Fort

== See also ==
- List of archaeological sites in Bahrain
