= Filipinos in Bahrain =

Total population
- 40,000 (2012)

Languages
- Filipino or other languages of the Philippines, English and Arabic

Religion
- Roman Catholicism or other Christian denominations, Islam

Related ethnic groups
- Filipino people, Overseas Filipinos

Filipinos in Bahrain are either migrants or descendants of the Philippines living in Bahrain. As of 2012, there are approximately 40,000 of these Filipinos in Bahrain.

== Economy and employment ==
Bahrain is the eighth largest destination for Filipino domestic workers hired or rehired from 2006 to 2011, and has 21,254 documented overseas Filipino domestic workers as of July 2012. In addition, Filipinos in Bahrain commonly work as accountants, construction contractors, engineers, sales associates, as well as business and government support staff. In March 2011, the Philippine government implemented a "deployment ban" on hiring Filipinos in Bahrain due to the Bahraini uprising as a part of the Arab Spring, allowing existing Filipino employees to continue working in Bahrain while preventing new workers from entering the nation, but this ban was lifted several months later that year. Filipinos working in Bahrain remitted US$151.82 million from January to November 2012, about 7 per cent more than in the same period in 2011. As per November 2012, Filipinos now account for 10 per cent of Bahrain's population, working mostly as hotel, restaurant and mall employees.

Bahrain is a source of remittances sent back to the Philippines, with roughly US$155 million officially sent back in 2011 and a peak of US$166.2 million sent back in 2009. Six Filipino banks have correspondent accounts with banks in Bahrain to allow for remittance transfers.

== Society and culture ==
In October 1994, the Philippine School Bahrain was established to serve the overseas Filipino community. Originally based in the Kanoo Gardens district, the school moved to its current site in the A’Ali area of Isa Town in Manama and currently has nearly 900 students in three separate schools: a pre-school, an elementary school, and a secondary school all housed in three separate buildings. The school is accredited by the Philippine Department of Education and is seeking accreditation by the Philippine Accrediting Association of Schools, Colleges and Universities.

In 1998, Akmad Sakkam, the previous Filipino Ambassador to Bahrain, said that "Bahrain is the only country in the Middle East where there are no Filipinos in jail", attributing this to good diplomatic relations and a sense of understanding between the Philippine and Bahraini governments. However, by 2006, this number later rose 18 Filipinos in prison, the majority of them being women. In 2011, a Filipino man in Bahrain was convicted of "encouraging moral depravation" and jailed after cross-dressing and was later deported.

Philippine holidays such as Independence Day, commemorating the Philippine Declaration of Independence, are celebrated in Bahrain.

== See also ==
- Bahrain–Philippines relations
- Filipino diaspora
- Immigration to Bahrain
