= Qal'at al-Bahrain =

Archaeological site in Bahrain

- قلعة البحرين (Arabic); Forte de Barém (Portuguese)
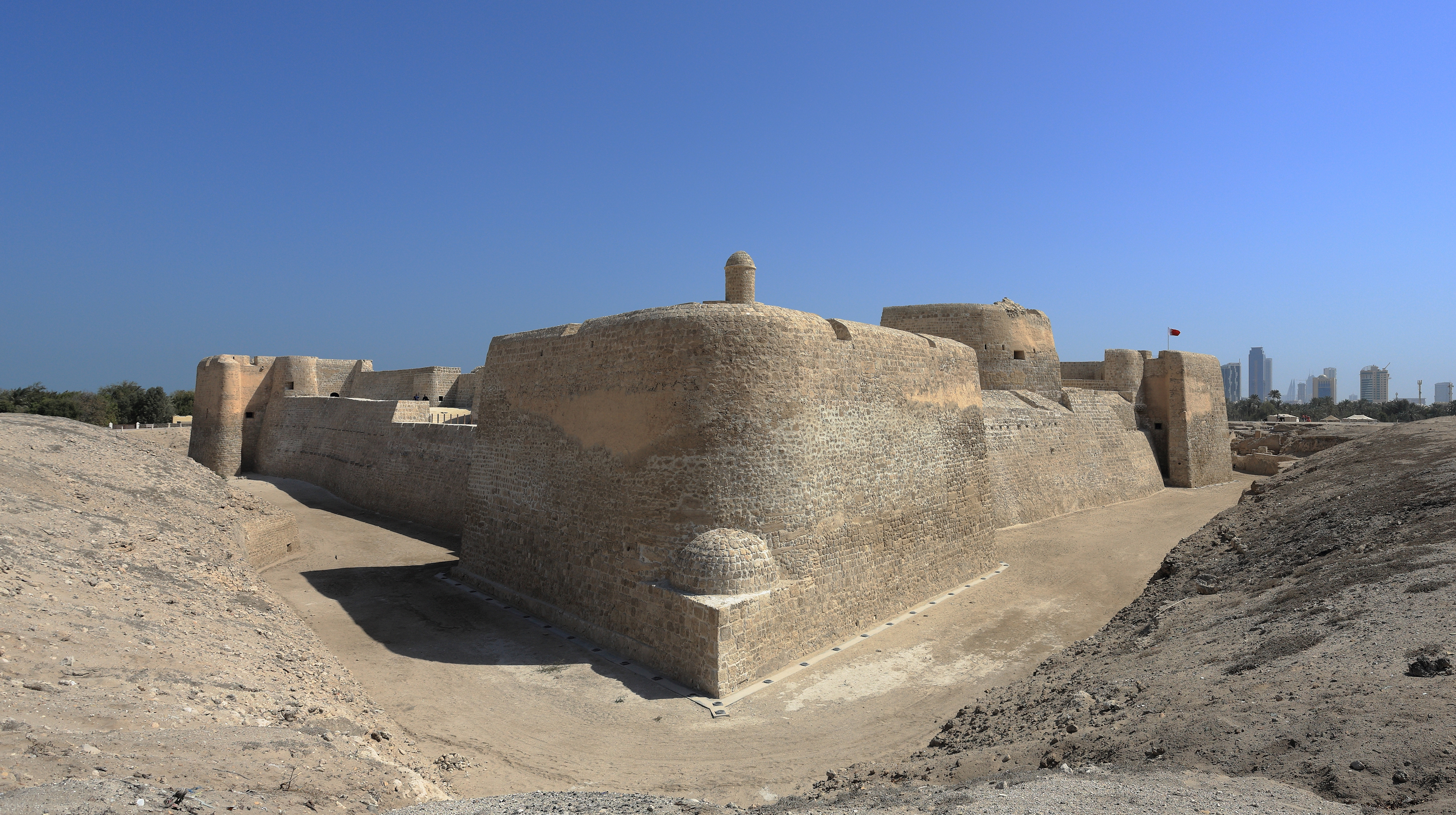

- Location within Bahrain
- 26°14′01″N 50°31′14″E
- Type: Settlement
- Location: Capital Governorate, Bahrain

History
- Built: 2300 BC
- Abandoned: 16th century AD

Site notes
- Condition: In ruins

UNESCO World Heritage Site
- Official name: Qal`at al-Bahrain – Ancient Harbour and Capital of Dilmun
- Type: Cultural
- Criteria: ii, iii, iv
- Designated: 2005 (29th session), modified 2008 and 2014
- Reference no.: 1192ter
- Region: Arab States

The Qal'at al-Bahrain (also Qala'at al-Bahrain) (Arabic: قلعة البحرين; Portuguese: Forte de Barém), also known as the Bahrain Fort or Portuguese Fort, is an archaeological site located in Bahrain. Archaeological excavations carried out since 1954 have unearthed antiquities from an artificial mound of 12 m (39 ft) height containing seven stratified layers, created by various occupants from 2300 BC up to the 18th century, including Kassites, Greeks, Portuguese and Persians, making it the oldest fortification in the Persian Gulf region. It was once the capital of the Dilmun civilization and was inscribed as a UNESCO World Heritage Site in 2005.

== About ==
The fort and the tell Qal'at al-Bahrain, is built on are located on the northern shore of Bahrain Island. On a clear day it is also seen from Saar. It stands like a "sentinel" near Manama, the capital of Bahrain; it is 6 km (4 mi) away from Manama on the fertile north coast. The tell is the largest in the Persian Gulf region and was built close to the port and by reclamation of seashore land.

== History and explorations ==
The archaeological findings unearthed in the fort reveal much about the history of the country. The area is thought to have been occupied for about 5000 years and contains a valuable insight into the Copper and Bronze Ages of Bahrain. The first Bahrain Fort was built around three thousand years ago, on the northeastern peak of Bahrain Island. The present fort dates from the sixth century AD. The capital of the Dilmun civilization, Dilmun was, according to the Epic of Gilgamesh, the "land of immortality", the ancestral place of Sumerians and a meeting point of gods.

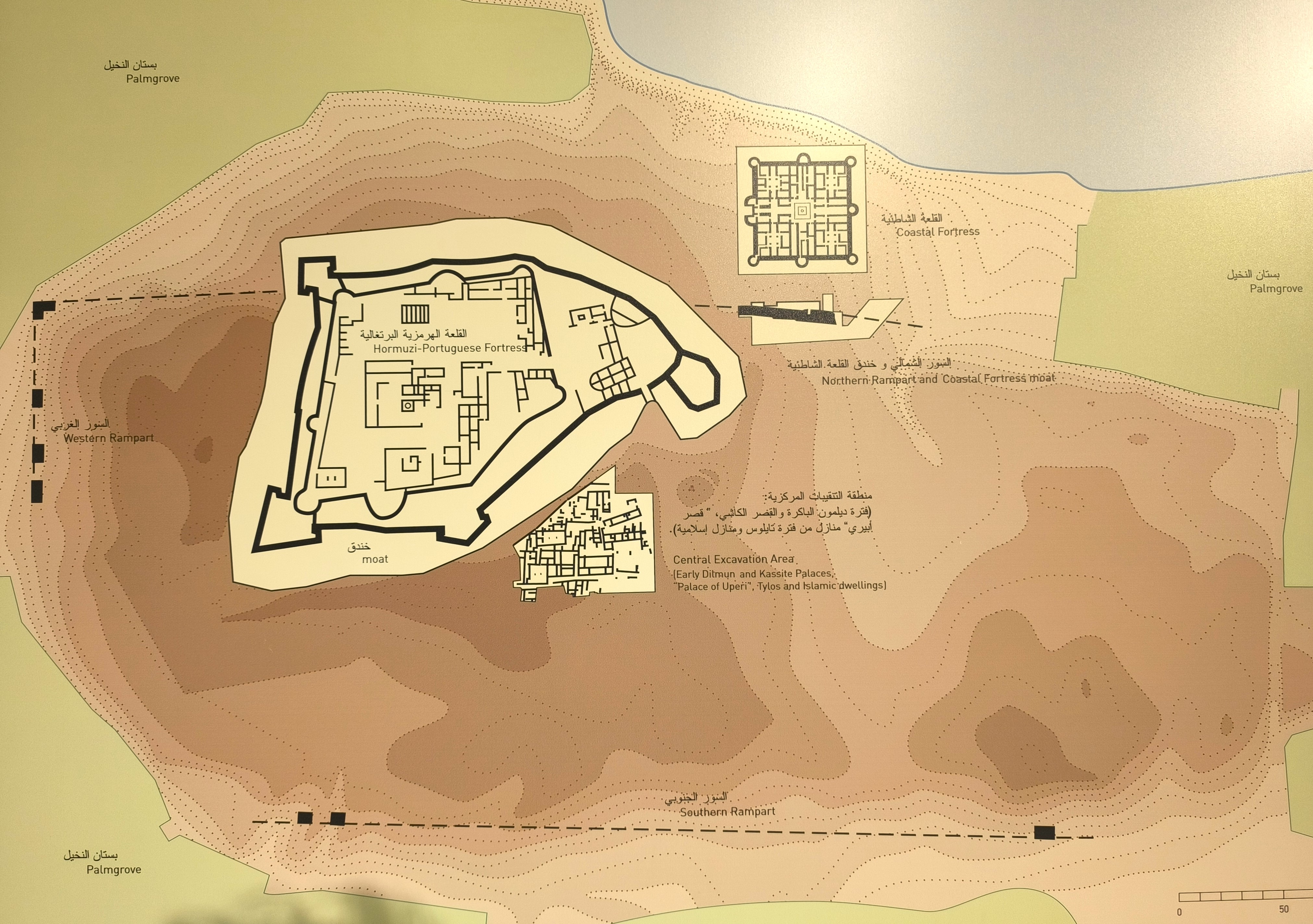
Map of the site.

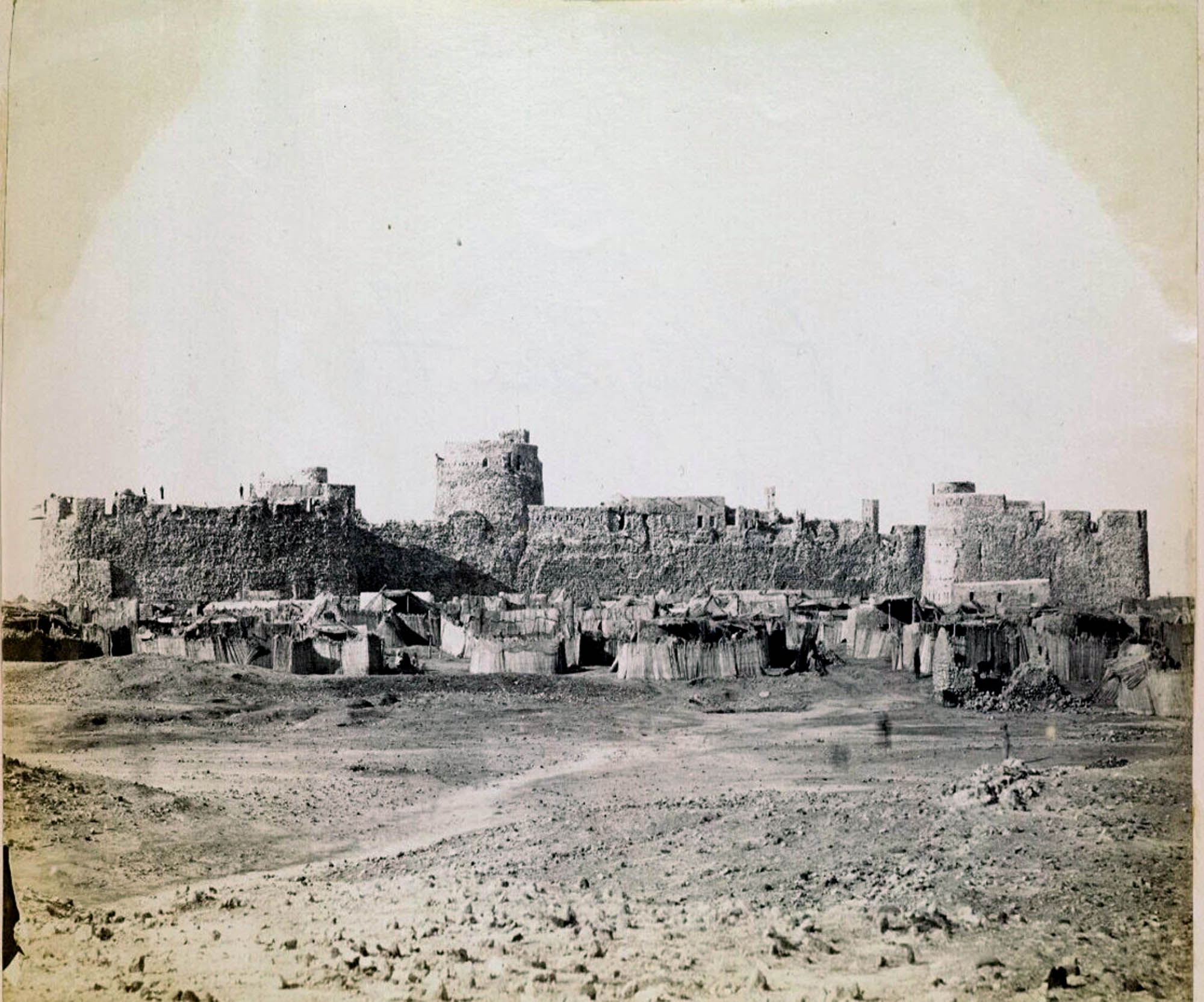
The fort in c.1870

The site, 17.5 hectares in area, has been termed as Bahrain's "most important site in antiquity". The first excavation at the site was carried out by a Danish archaeological expedition led by Geoffrey Bibby between 1954 and 1972 on behalf of the Prehistoric Museum of Moesgaard. A few, undated but Kassite era, cuneiform tablets were found. Beginning in the 1970s, a French expedition from the National Centre for Scientific Research worked the site. About 50 tablets were uncovered. Three of them were dated to the reign of a Kassite king named Agum, believed to be Agum III. Since 1987 Danish and Bahrain archaeologists have excavated at the site. The Danish expedition revealed that it was also a notable Hellenistic site.

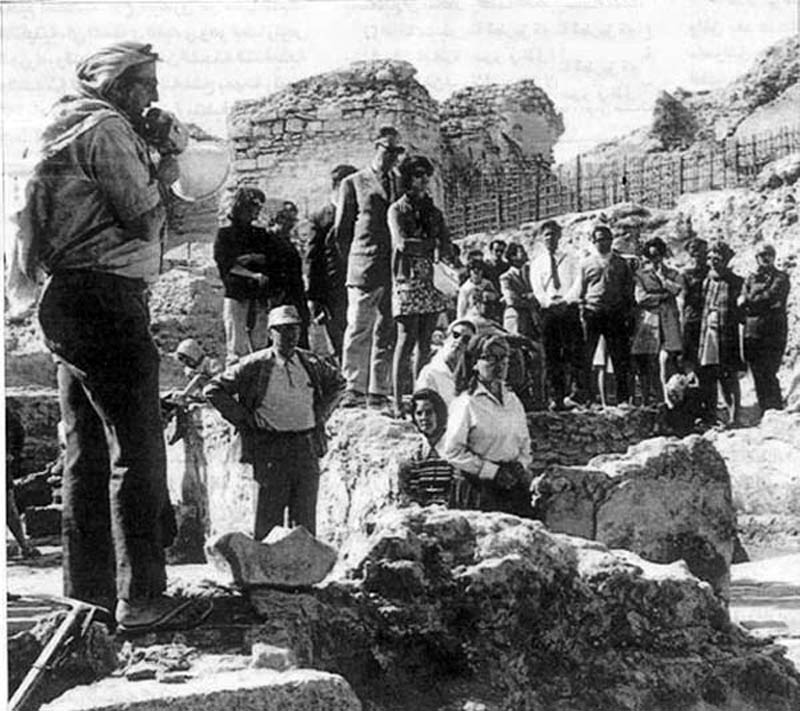
The Danish archaeological expedition led by Geoffrey Bibby at the excavated site of the Bahrain Fort in the 1950s.

== Description ==
Qal`at al-Bahrain is a typical tell – an artificial mound created by many successive layers of human occupation. The strata spreads over a 180,000 sq ft (16,723 m^{2}) area, which encompasses the tell. This testifies to a continuous human presence from about 2300 BC to the 16th century AD. About 25% of the site has been excavated revealing structures of different types: residential, public, commercial, religious and military. They testify to the importance of the site as a trading port over the centuries. On the top of the 12-metre-high (39 ft) mound, there is the impressive Qalʿat al-Burtughal (Portuguese fort), which gave the whole site its name, qalʿa, meaning "fort". As the site was the capital of the Dilmun civilisation, it contains the richest remains of this civilization, which was hitherto only known from written Sumerian references.

The site contains many areas and walls, including Saar necropolis, Al-Hajjar necropolis, Kassite Palace, Madimat Hermand necropolis, Madimat Isa necropolis, Al-Maqsha Necropolis, Palace of Uperi, Shakhura necropolis, and the Northern city wall. The ruins of the Copper Age consists of two sections of the fortification wall surrounding streets and houses, and a colossal building on the edge of the moat of the Portuguese fort in the centre. Barbar pottery has been unearthed around the walls of the central building, dating back to the same age as the Barbar Temples, although some of the other pottery and range of unearthed artefacts indicated that they predated the temples, dating back to 3000 BC or later. Relics of copper and ivory provide an insight into ancient trade links. Many vessels have been unearthed on the site, and Danish excavations of the Palace of Uperi area revealed "snake bowls", sarcophagi, seals and a mirror, among other things.

== Layout ==
The excavations of the tel have revealed a small settlement, the only one of that period in eastern Arabia, on its northern side. It has been inferred that the village was settled by people who developed agriculture near the oasis, planted palm trees, tended cattle, sheep and goats and also ventured into fishing in the Arabian Sea. The small houses they built were made of rough stone with clay or mortar as binding material. The plastered floors in the houses were said to have been spacious. Excavations also hinted that the village had streets which separated the housing complexes.

The fortifications seen in the excavated tel area were found around the township and were erected in cardinal directions. The fort walls are seen now only in the northern, western and southern slopes of the tel, and the eastern side is yet to be excavated. The fortifications covered an area of 15 ha (37 acres), and the walls were built with varying thickness by using stone masonry, and had gates which allowed transport and passing through, such as of donkey caravans. The fortifications were frequently raised, as noted from the gates erected at four levels; the latest gate had two polished stone (made of fine-grained material) pivots which fixed a double-leafed gate. The western wall was seen well-preserved for a length of 9 m (30 ft). The streets were laid in north–south direction and were 12 m (39 ft) wide.

There was a palace in the centre of the tel at a commanding location consisting of several warehouses which were inferred as indicative of economic activity during the Dilmun period. Proceeding from here towards the north, along the street leads, to a large gate that probably was the entry to the palace grounds. The modest houses built in the same size and type of construction were laid along a network of roads.

The place prospered till 1800 BC after when it was deserted. Eventually the town became covered with drift sand from the sea.

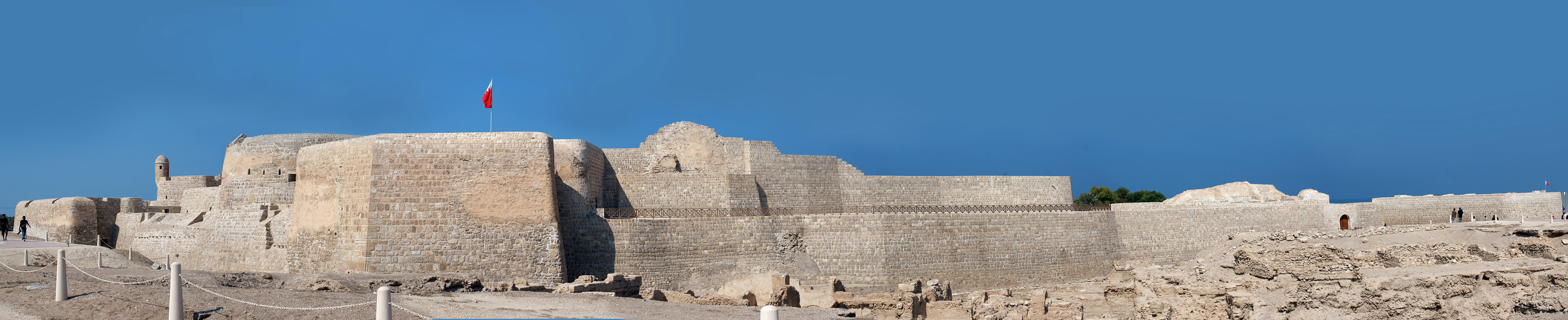
Panoramic view of the Bahrain Fort.

== Relics ==
Metal artifacts found in the tell were limited to copper pieces, fishing tools and a socketed spearhead; a workshop of 525 m (1,722 ft) size was also identified where copper casting two piece moulds and wax moulds were found. Small and large crucibles used for melting of metal were recovered in substantial quantities indicative of large scale manufacture by professional artisans. The copper ware was then traded in surrounding countries such as Oman and Mesopotamia. Dilmun stamp seals were also recovered from the excavations.

Pots and vessels were also recovered. Pots were used for cooking, while the large vessels for food import from Oman and Mesopotamia. Artifacts found there indicates the location. These include a cuneiform inscription and hematite, both of which link to Mesopotamia; steatite bowls to Oman; and carnelian beads, a stone weight and a few potsherds to the Indus Civilization.

== Gallery ==
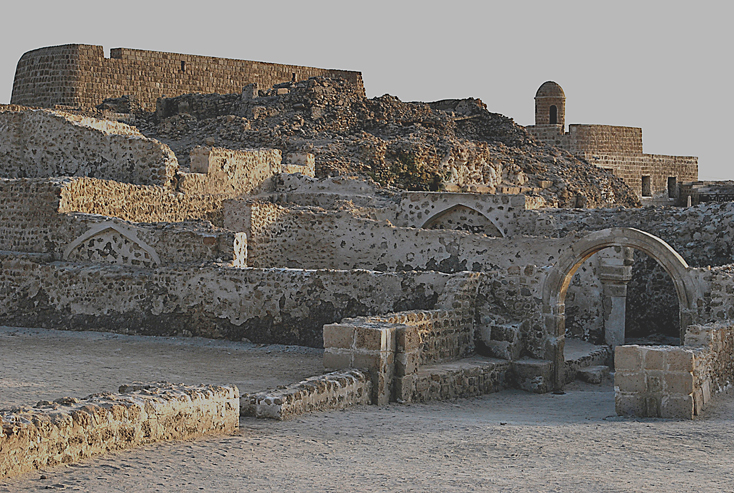
Overview of the Bahrain Fort

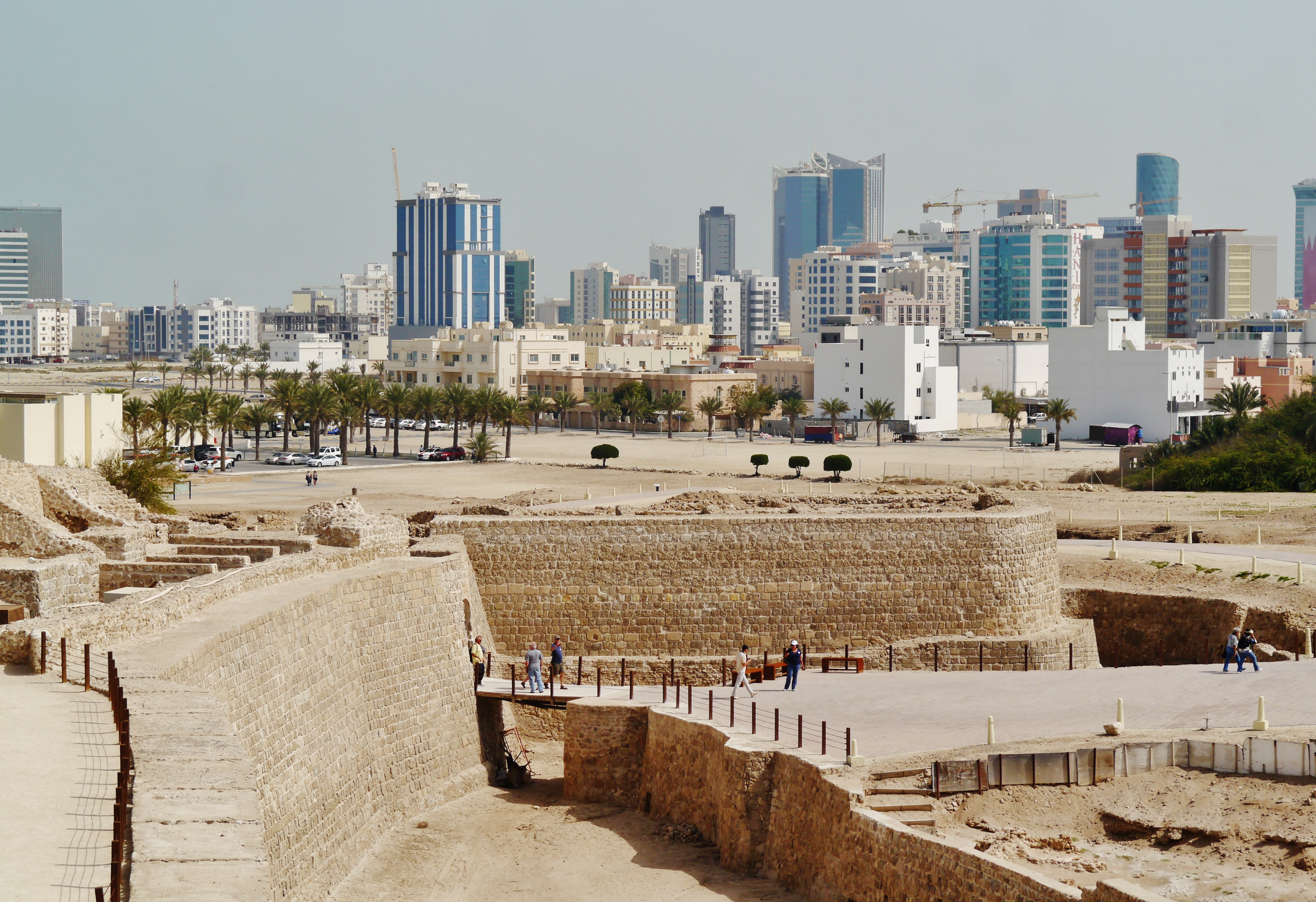
Moat of the fort

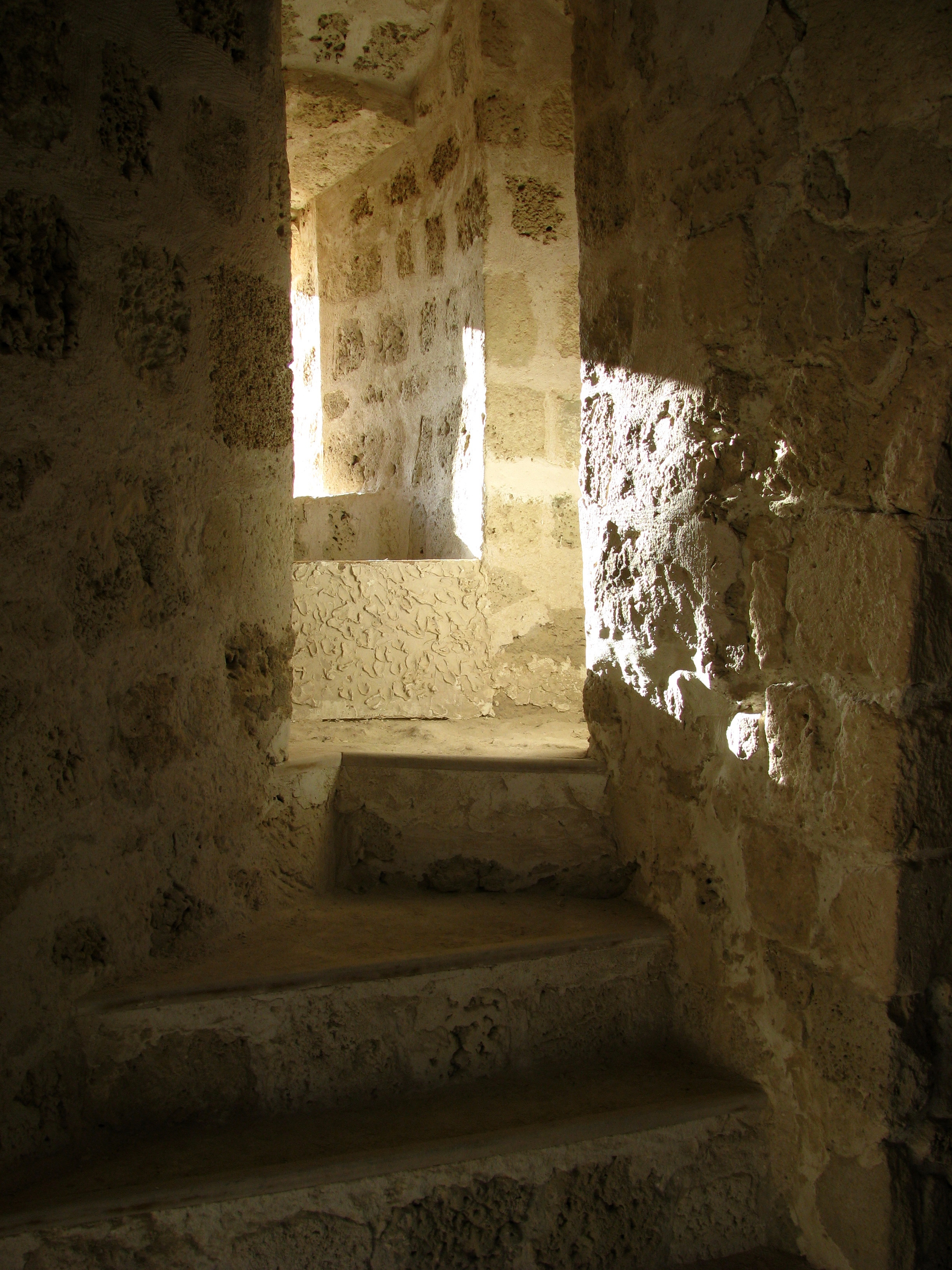
Staircase inside the fort

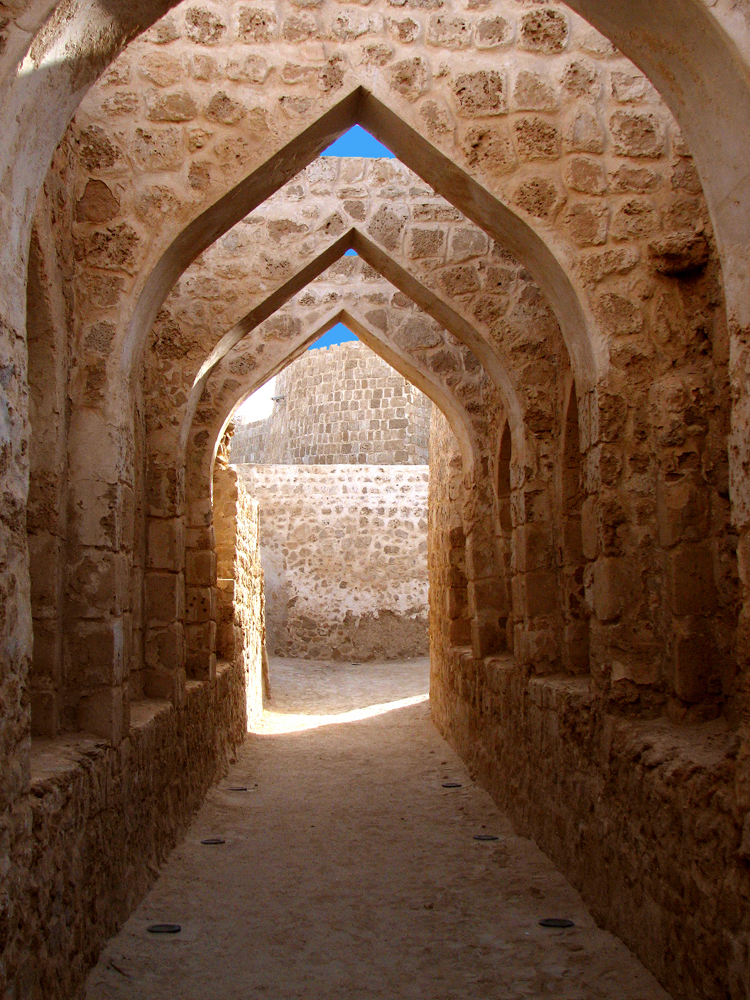
Archways present in the fort

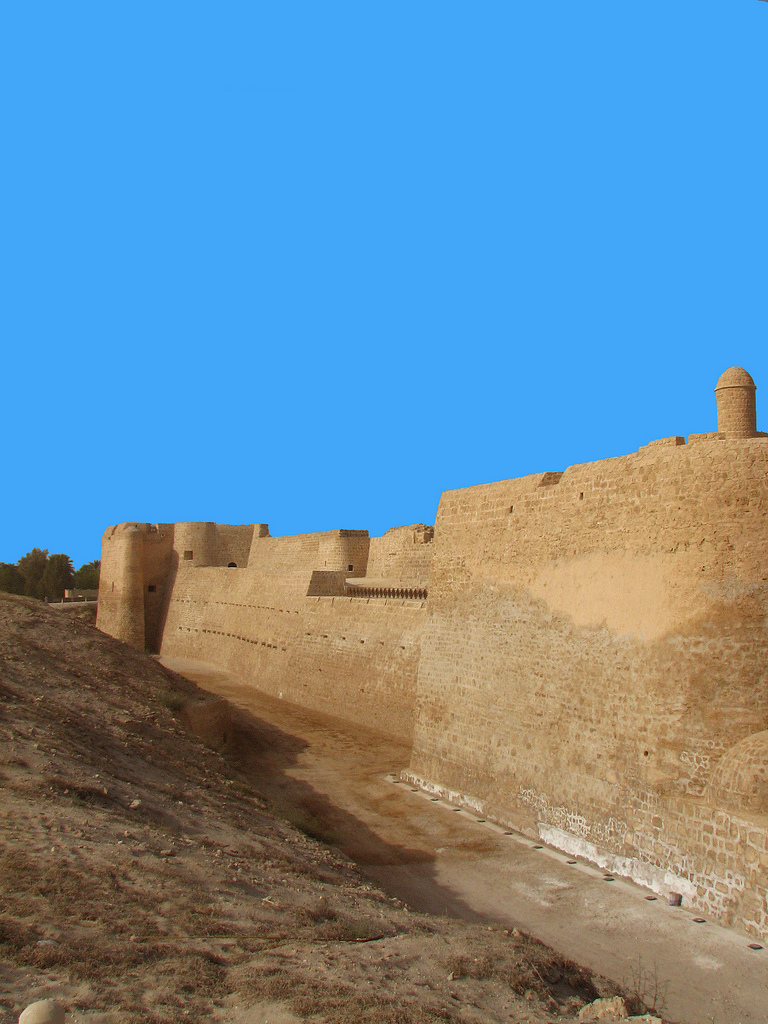
The exterior view of the fort

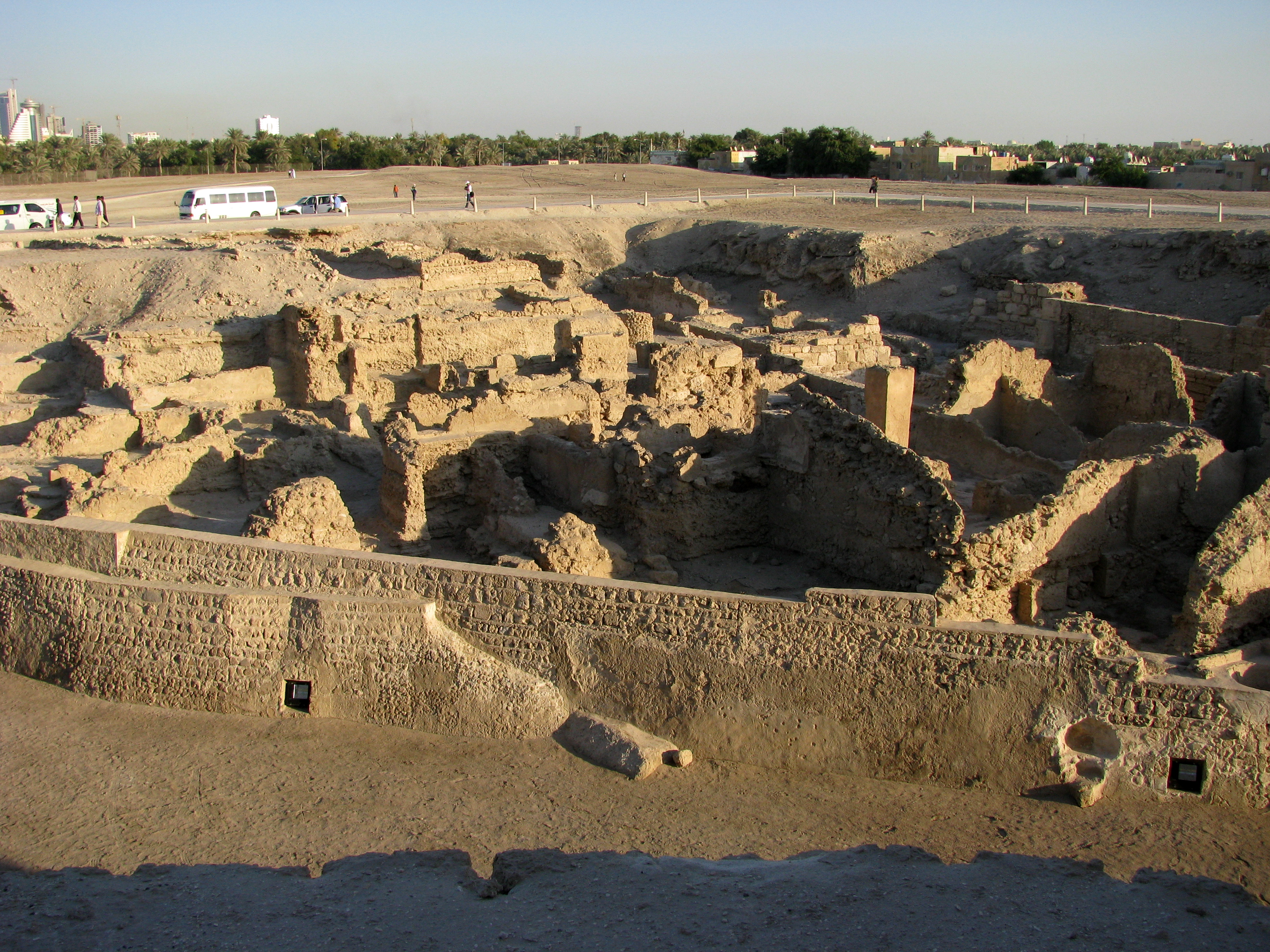
Archaeological excavations at the site

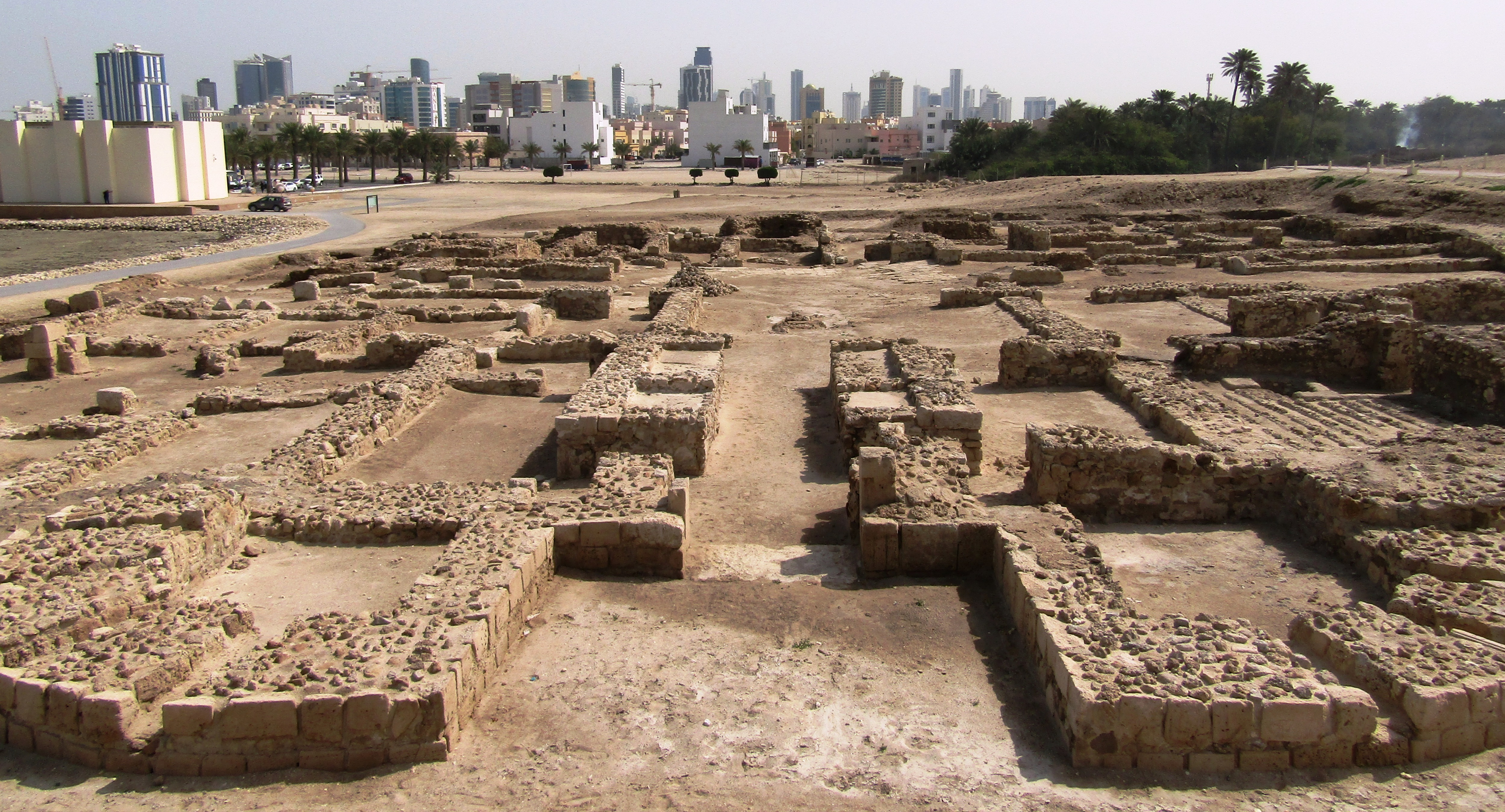
Dilmunite ruins at the fort

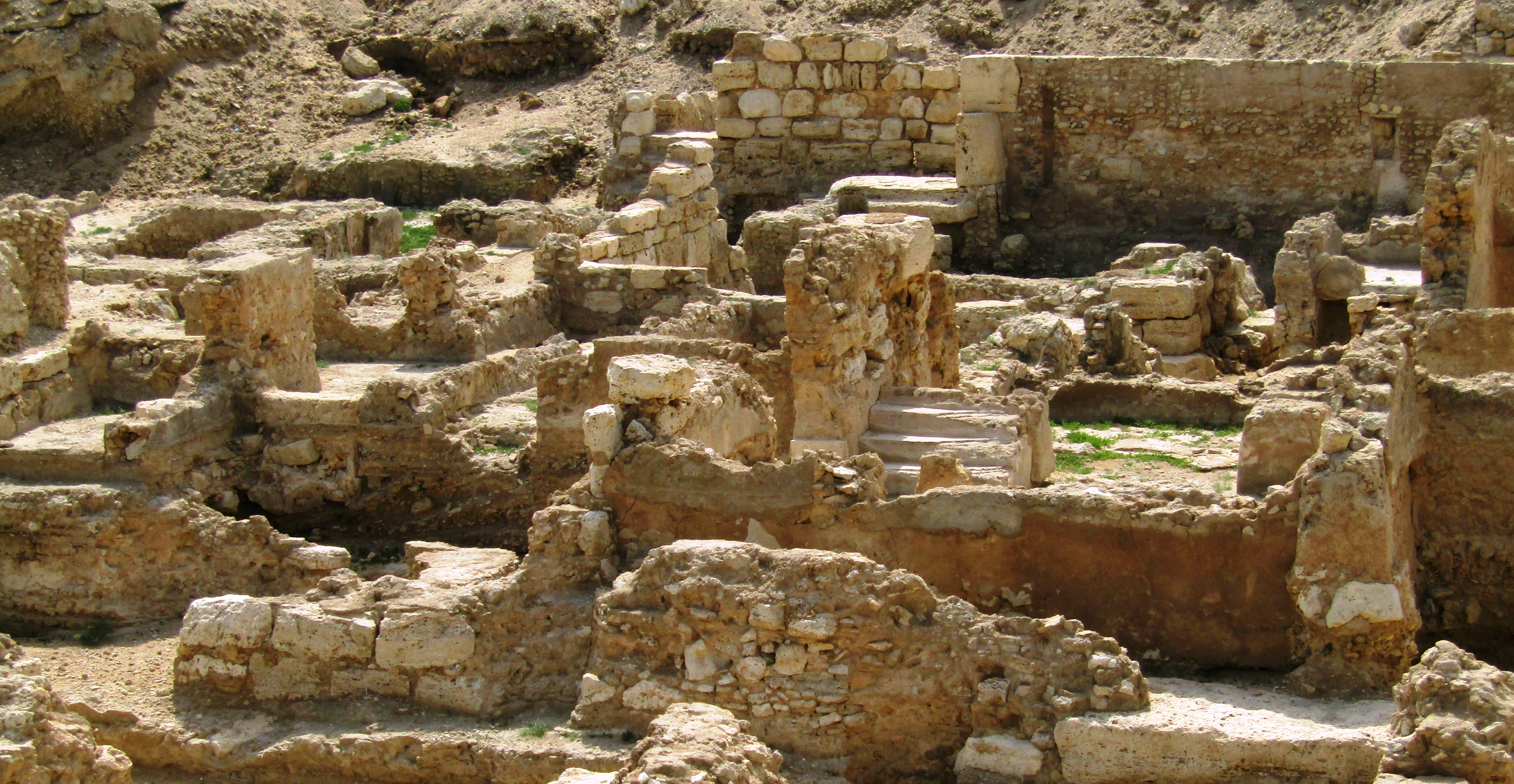
Ruins at the fort

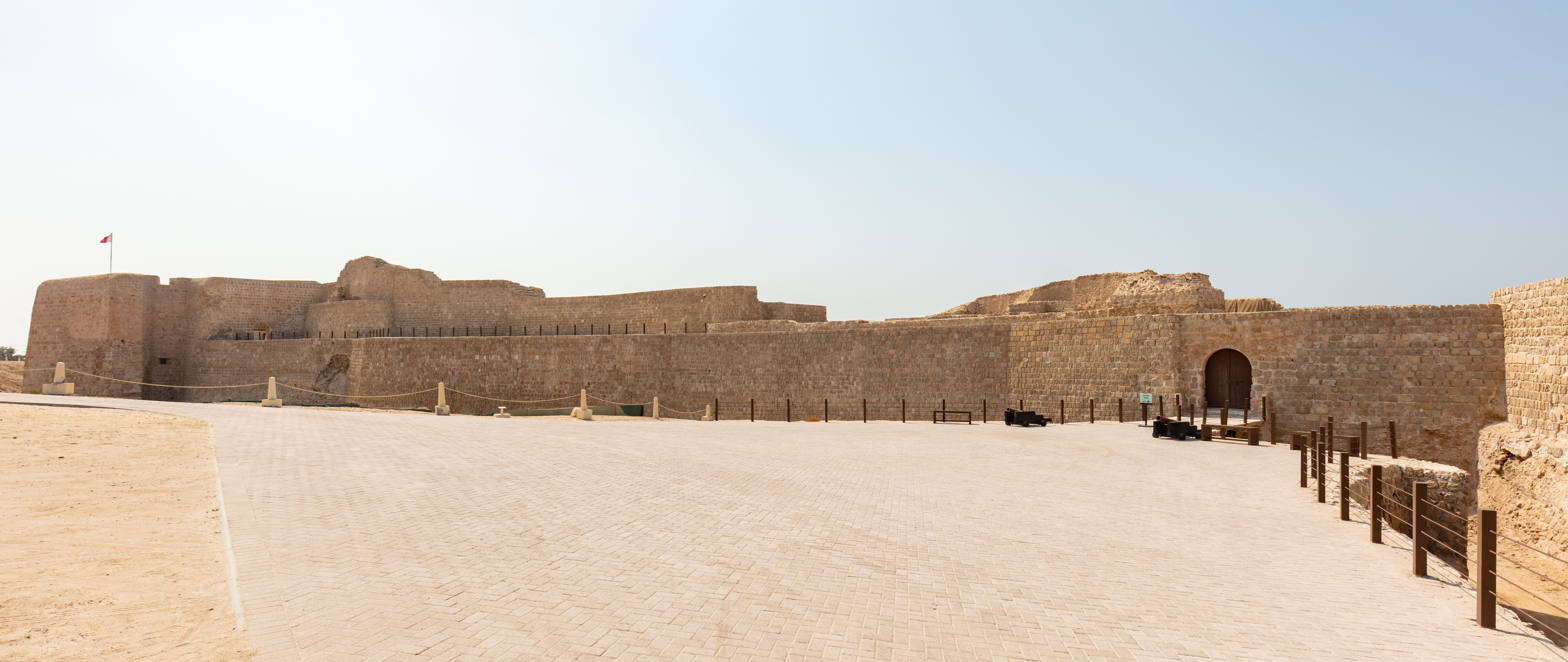
Entrance to the fort

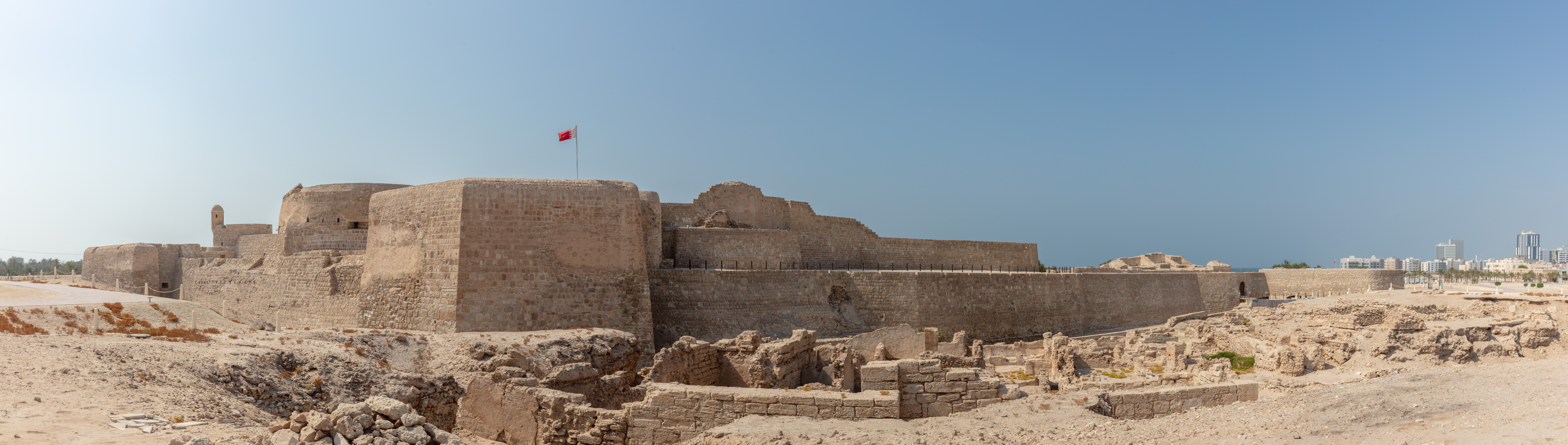
Panorama of the exterior of the fort

== See also ==
- List of archaeological sites in Bahrain
- Cities of the ancient Near East
- Tell Dehaila

== More Information ==
- Lombard, Pierre. "Qal’at al-Bahrain, Ancient Capital and Harbour of Dilmun. The Site Museum." (2016).
- Lombard, P. 1986. Iron Age Dilmun. A reconsideration of City IV at Qala’t al Bahrain. In: A.M al-Khalifa and M. Rice (Eds.), Bahrain through the Ages. London. pp. 225–232
- Kervran, Monik; Hiebert, Fredrik Talmage; Rougeulle, Axelle (2005). Qalʻat al-Bahrain: a trading and military outpost 3rd millennium B.C. – 17th century A.D. Brepols. ISBN 978-2-503-99107-8.
