= Bu Ghazal =

Coordinates: 26.2044°N 50.5708°E

Bu Ghazal ابو غزال Abu Ghazal
- Neighborhood
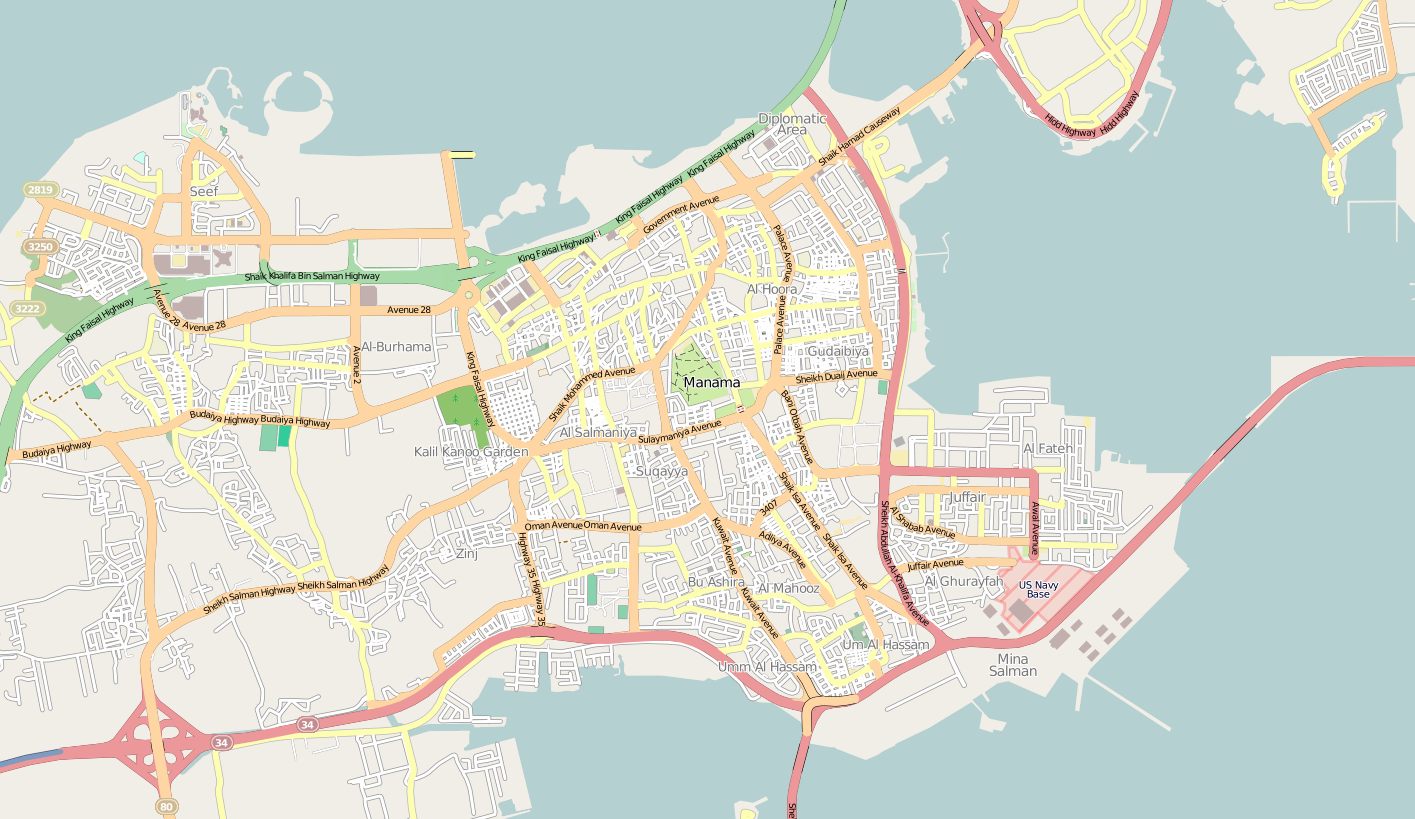
- Map of Manama
- Country: Bahrain
- Governorate: Capital Governorate

Bu Ghazal (Arabic: ابو غزال, sometimes called Abu Ghazal) is a neighborhood of Manama, Bahrain.

== History ==
Historically prior to the introduction of modern building techniques, the Bu Ghazal area was a source of a special type of white mud used as mortar in construction. The mud was shipped to Muharraq port by boat for use in building construction - a process that could take up to three days.

As of 2019, it is one of the few places in Bahrain where foreigners are allowed to buy and own property as stated in the 2001 Non-Bahrainis Ownership of Property and Plots Law, alongside Hoora, Seef, Amwaj Islands, the Diplomatic Area and Juffair.

== Geography ==
It is situated in southern Manama and is close to the neighbourhoods of Zinj to the west, Salmaniya to the north, with Mahooz and Umm Al Hassam to the east.
