= Bahrain–Philippines relations =

- Bahrain: Philippines

Bahrain–Philippines relations are the bilateral relations between Bahrain and the Philippines. The Philippines has an embassy in Manama whilst Bahrain does not have a resident ambassador.

== History ==
Formal diplomatic relations between Bahrain and the Philippines were established on 27 November 1978. Bilateral relations between the two nations have primarily expanded through reciprocal high-level visits and formal cooperation agreements spanning labor, public health, tourism, and diplomatic training. The two countries have signed several bilateral frameworks to structure institutional cooperation. In December 2003, a Memorandum of Understanding (MoU) on Tourism Cooperation was executed, followed by an agreement on public health cooperation in April 2007. The Philippine Department of Foreign Affairs and the Bahraini Ministry of Foreign Affairs established a mechanism for regular political consultations via an MoU signed in August 2013.

== State visits ==
The first Philippine head of state to make a state visit to Bahrain was then President Fidel V. Ramos from March 10–11, 1997. Bahraini Prime Minister Khalifa bin Salman Al Khalifa made a state visit from November 6–8, 2001. The prime minister was conferred the Order of Sikatuna with the rank Raja on November 7, 2001, during his visit. The Bahraini leader made two more visits in 2003 from February 25 to March 3 and October 29 to November 1. On December 14–15, then President Gloria Macapagal Arroyo made a state visit to Bahrain. Prime Minister Khalifa then made another working visit on April 7–13, 2005. Arroyo made another state visit on February 3–4, 2009.

== Labor relations ==
There are about 1,500-2,000 Filipinos working as medical workers in Bahrain in 2007. As of 2014, there are more than 67,000 Filipinos in Bahrain, some of them are workers in Bahrain.

== See also ==
- Foreign relations of Bahrain
- Foreign relations of the Philippines
