= Bahraini art =

The modern Bahraini art movement emerged in the 1950s, with the establishment of an Arts and Literature club in 1952. The club served as an umbrella group for professional and amateur artists, musicians, and actors in Bahrain. In 1956, the first art exhibition was held in the Bahraini capital, Manama. Expressionism and surrealism, as well as calligraphic art are the popular forms of art in the country. Abstract expressionism has gained popularity in recent decades.

== History ==
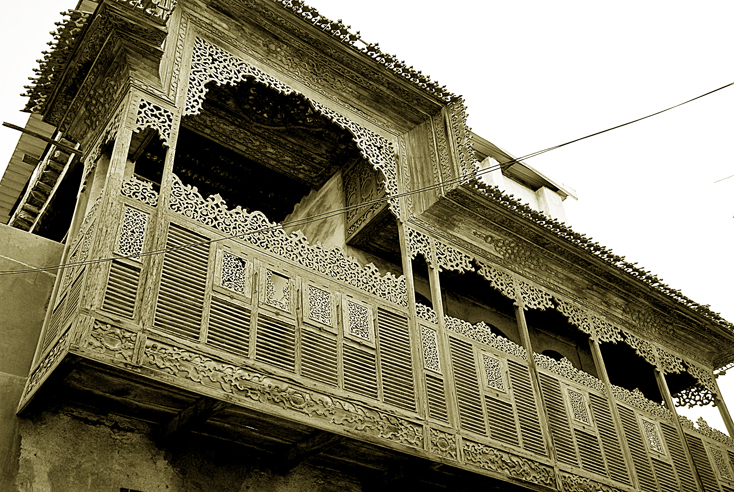
Traditional house in Manama.

In 1983, the Bahrain Arts Society was founded when a group of 34 Bahraini artists approached the government and asked for a non-profit cultural organisation to be established. The society hosted multiple exhibitions in and out of the country and offered training in the arts of sculpting, pottery, Arabic calligraphy, painting, interior designing and photography. Most Bahraini artists in the 20th century were trained in Cairo or Baghdad, the cultural art capitals of the Arab world. It was in this period that expressionism and surrealism became widely popular in the country. Arabic calligraphy grew in popularity as the Bahraini government was an active patron in Islamic art, culminating in the establishment of an Islamic museum, Beit Al Quran. The Bahrain National Museum houses a permanent contemporary art exhibition.

== Architecture ==
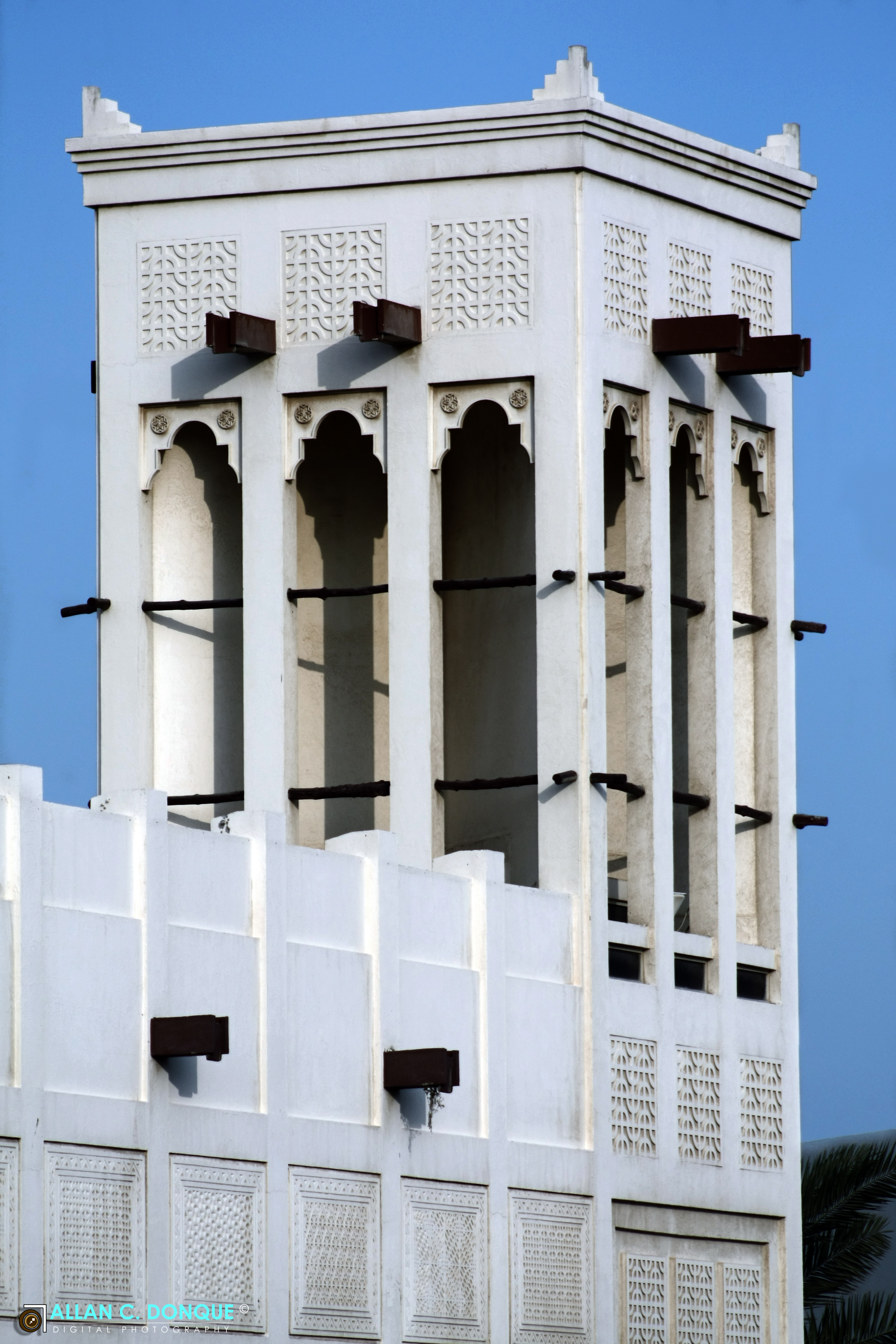
A wind tower in Bahrain.

Traditional Bahraini architecture is similar to that of its neighbours. Though the centuries-old forts in Bahrain resemble the same architectural style as in other forts in the Persian Gulf region, the domestic architecture in the country is unique in the region. The wind tower, which generates natural ventilation in a house, is a common sight on old buildings, particularly in the old districts of Manama and Muharraq, which have been brought in by migrant Iranian communities into the region.

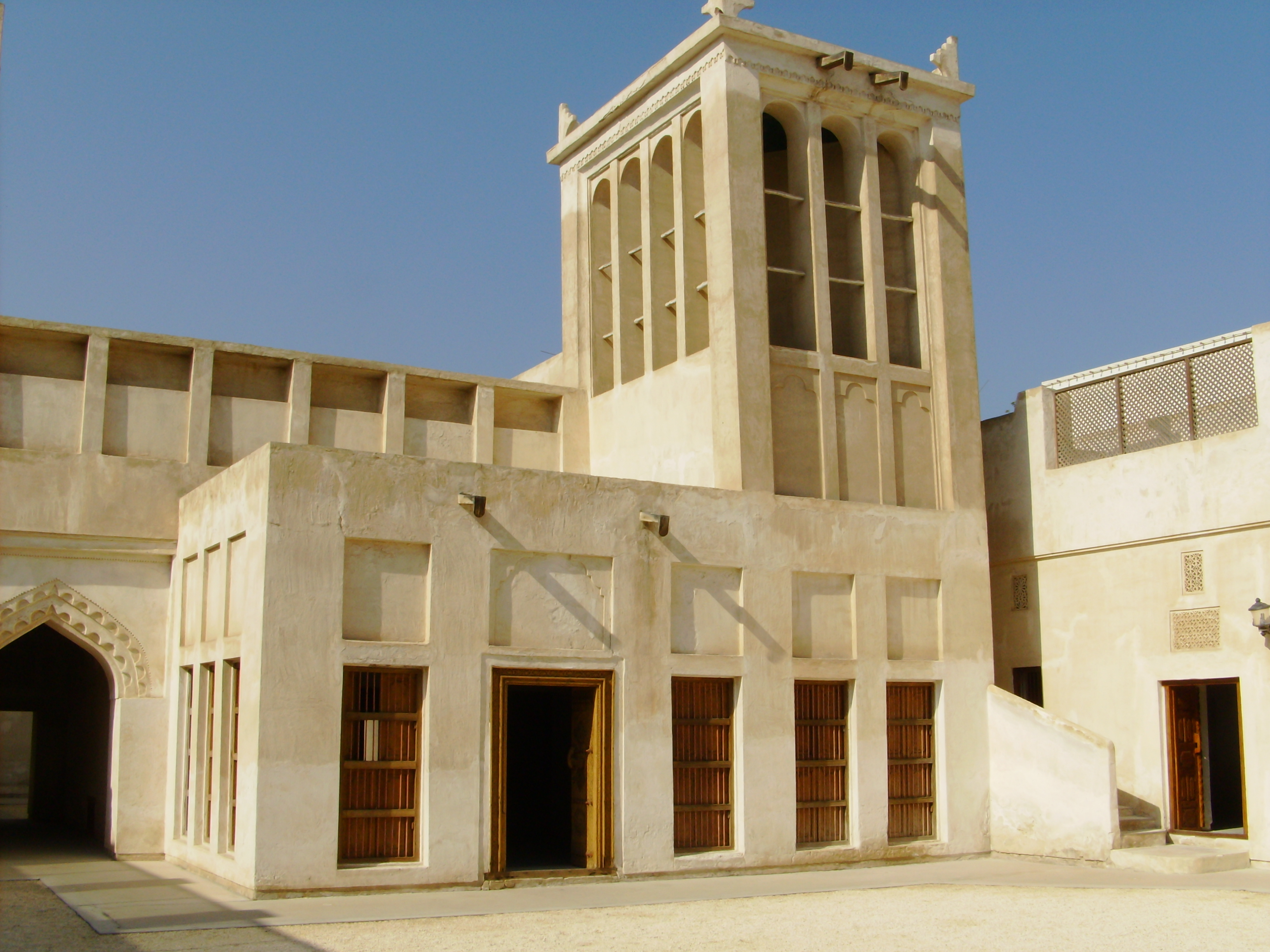
The Isa ibn Ali Al Khalifa house is an example of traditional architecture in Bahrain.

A traditional Bahraini house was made up of a series of pavilions around a courtyard. Traditionally, houses had two courtyards (though sometimes only one); one would host the reception of men and the other would be for private living use. The house's rooms were organised in terms of seasonal migration, with the important pavilions for living and hosting receptions having a counterpart on the roof to capture summer breezes and redirect it into the pavilion. The lower rooms of the house would have thick walls, allowing them to be utilised during the cool winter months. To combat the intense heat during the summer months, a framework of coral rubble piers with spaces filled with large panels of coral rocks were erected. The light-weight and porous coral is lined with a coat of lime and gypsum, and this causes warm air to be trapped in the spaces during the day. Hundreds of buildings with this feature were built in Bahrain but virtually none currently function, with most not being repaired or serviced in several decades. A disadvantage of the coral used is that its core is made from clay, as a mortar, and dissolves easily thus causing cracks to develop in the walls during rainy weather, compromising the structure's stability and requiring yearly maintenance.

Following independence and the oil boom of the 1970s, Western-style office buildings were built in the financial districts of Manama, particularly in the Diplomatic Area. Buildings with fusions of tradition and modernism, such as the Al Zamil Tower, have won awards such as the Aga Khan Award for Architecture in 2007.

== Crafts ==
Throughout the country's history, crafts such as potteries, sculptures and metal embroideries, particularly from copper or gold, were widely produced alongside traditionally made baskets woven from palm tree leaves in the villages outside Manama, notably Karbabad and Jasra.

=== Pottery ===
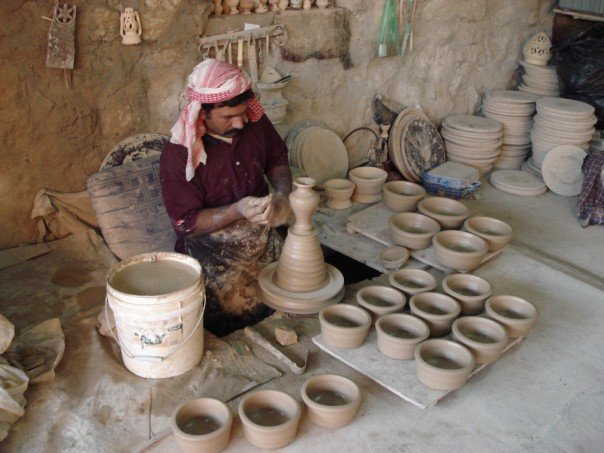
An artisan making pottery in Bahrain using the traditional mud and water mixture on a revolving wheel.

Pottery estimated to date from the Dilmun civilisation era in the fifth and fourth millennium BC were discovered in northern Bahrain, particularly but not exclusively in the Bahrain fort excavation site and in the Dilmun Burial Mounds. Though Mesopotamian, later potteries discovered indicated that they were created in Bahrain. Comparative analysis suggests that the locally made pottery was produced at a centralized location using materials derived from a single source. The earliest potteries on the island date to 2300 BC.

Potteries are still made traditionally in, particularly [A'ali] village which utilises the mud from the nearby flats in Riffa. The pottery is made using a mixture of mud and water that is placed on a revolving wheel operated by an artisan, where in the artisan would use his hands to modify the shape of the pottery as needed. After the needed shape was obtained, the pottery is left outside to dry and harden.

== Galleries ==
The country hosts a number of art galleries:

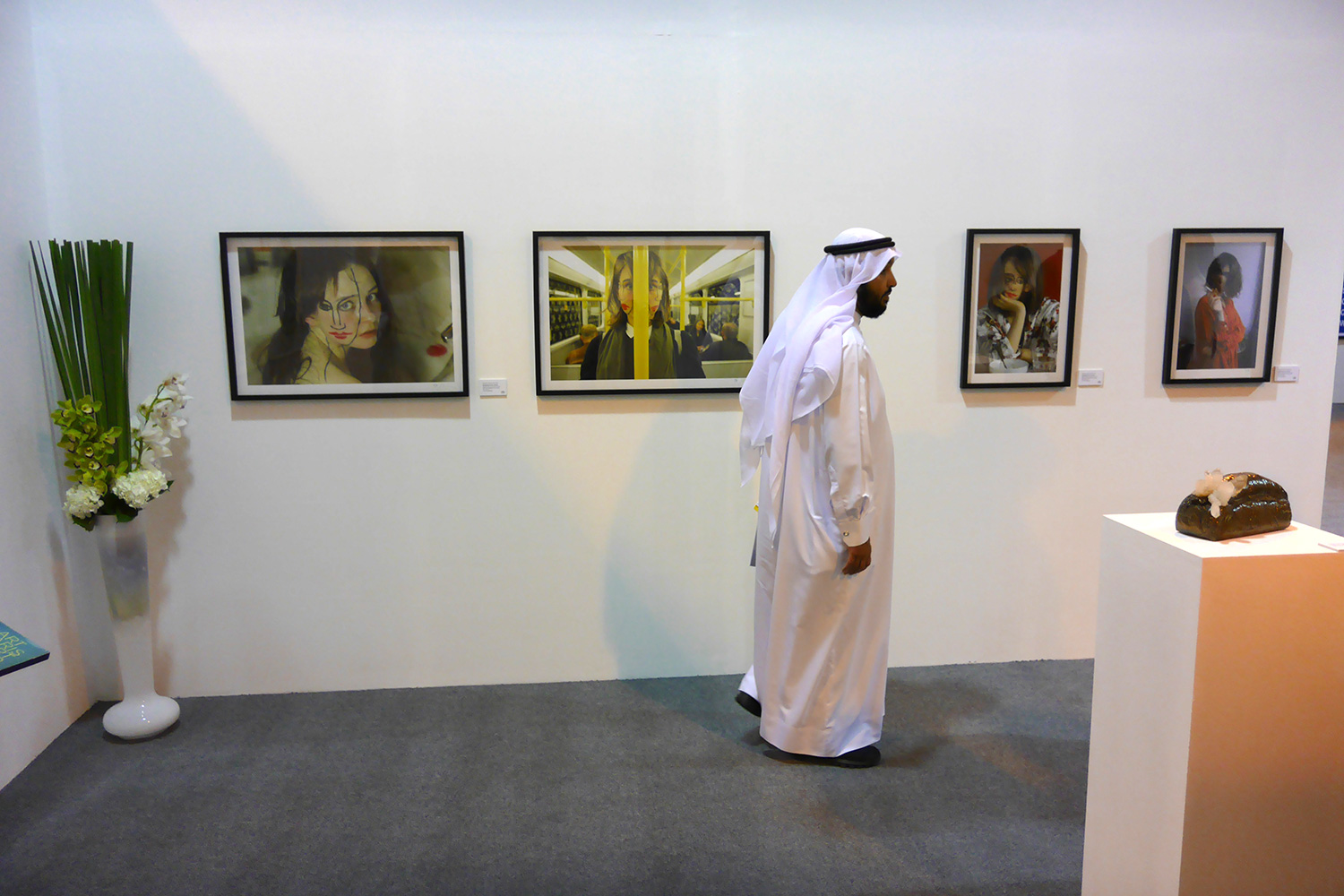
An art exhibition organized by the Bahrain Art Society in 2016.

- Albareh Art Gallery, in Adliya – First opened in 1998 by Bahraini art patron Hayfa Aljishi
- Al Riwaq Gallery, in Adliya – Opened in 1998 by Iraqi art patron Bayan Kanoo
- Ella Art Gallery, in Hoora
- The La fontaine centre of contemporary art, in Hoora
- Nadine Gallery, in Umm Al Hassam

== Bahraini artists ==
This is a list of notable veteran Bahraini artists of the 20th century:

- Abdul Aziz bin Mohammed al Khalifa – Expressionist artist.
- Ahmed Qasim Sinni – Expressionist artist.
- Abdul Karim Al-Orrayed (born 1936) – Expressionist artist.
- Nasser Yousif (born 1940) – Expressionist artist.
- Rashid Swar (born 1940) – Expressionist artist.
- Abdullah Al Muharraqi (born 1939) – Expressionist and Surrealist artist.
- Abbas Saeed Al Mahroos (born 1943, died 2006) - Reductionist artist.
- Abdul Latif Mufiz (born 1950) – Known for his abstract expressionist paintings.
- AbdulRahim Sharif (born 1954).
- Othman Khunji (born 1983) – Interdisciplinary Conceptual Artist
- Badie al-Shaikh (born 1955) – Known for calligraphy works.
- Abdul-Elah al Arab (born 1954) – A calligrapher who used geometric kufics in his works.
- Hala bint Mohammed Al Khalifa (born 1977) is a politician and artist who became Director General of the Culture and Arts.
- Rashid bin Khalifa Al Khalifa (born 1952).
- Leena Al Ayoobi (born 1981) - Known for her Feminist art
- Abbas Al Mosawi (born 1955) – Known for his abstract work in nature and peace.
- Jamal A. Rahim (First Bahraini Artist presented in Christie's auction house)
- Jamal A. Rahim (born 1965) – well known as a Printmaker, Sculptor and painter. Jamal A. Rahim
- Adel Mohamed Al-Abbasi (sculptor and Expressionist artist)
- Salman Mubarak AlNajem (born 1992) – Neo-Expressionist artist.

Other notable Bahraini artists with international recognition are:

- Omar Al Rashid
- Balqees Fakhro
- Elyas Rasti
- Faika Al Hassan
- Maryam Janahi
- Mariam Fakhro
- Zainab Alafeya
- Husain Isa (born 1972)

== See also ==
- Culture of Bahrain
