= Nuzul Al Salam Hotel =

Coordinates: 26.2463444°N 50.6126416°E

Nuzul Al Salam Hotel (Arabic: نزل السلام) is a heritage hotel in Muharraq, Bahrain. It dates to 1947, when it was known as Fathallah House. The hotel is the first to be located on the Bahrain Pearling Trail, a UNESCO World Heritage Site. Restoration and remodeling were done as part of the Bahrain Heritage Building Restoration Project (Arabic: مشروع استعادة المباني التراثية في البحرين), a partnership with the United Arab Emirates. The hotel, part of an agreement signed by the two countries in 2018, was opened in October 2019 by the Sheikh Shaikh Ebrahim bin Mohammed Al Khalifa Center for Culture and Research and an Emirati delegation led by Noura Al Kaabi, the UAE Minister of Culture and Knowledge Development.

== Design ==
The building is based on the traditional architecture of the area and was designed by a team of local design students. Mosaics and wall hangings inside depict events from the Epic of Gilgamesh. The walls are also decorated with quotes from Sheikh Zayed bin Sultan Al Nahyan. The hotel is furnished in the style of the 1940s, featuring orange and lemon trees in the courtyard and a central wooden staircase connecting the rooms. The building was designed and built over a period of six months.
