= Muharram in Bahrain =

Religious period of mourning

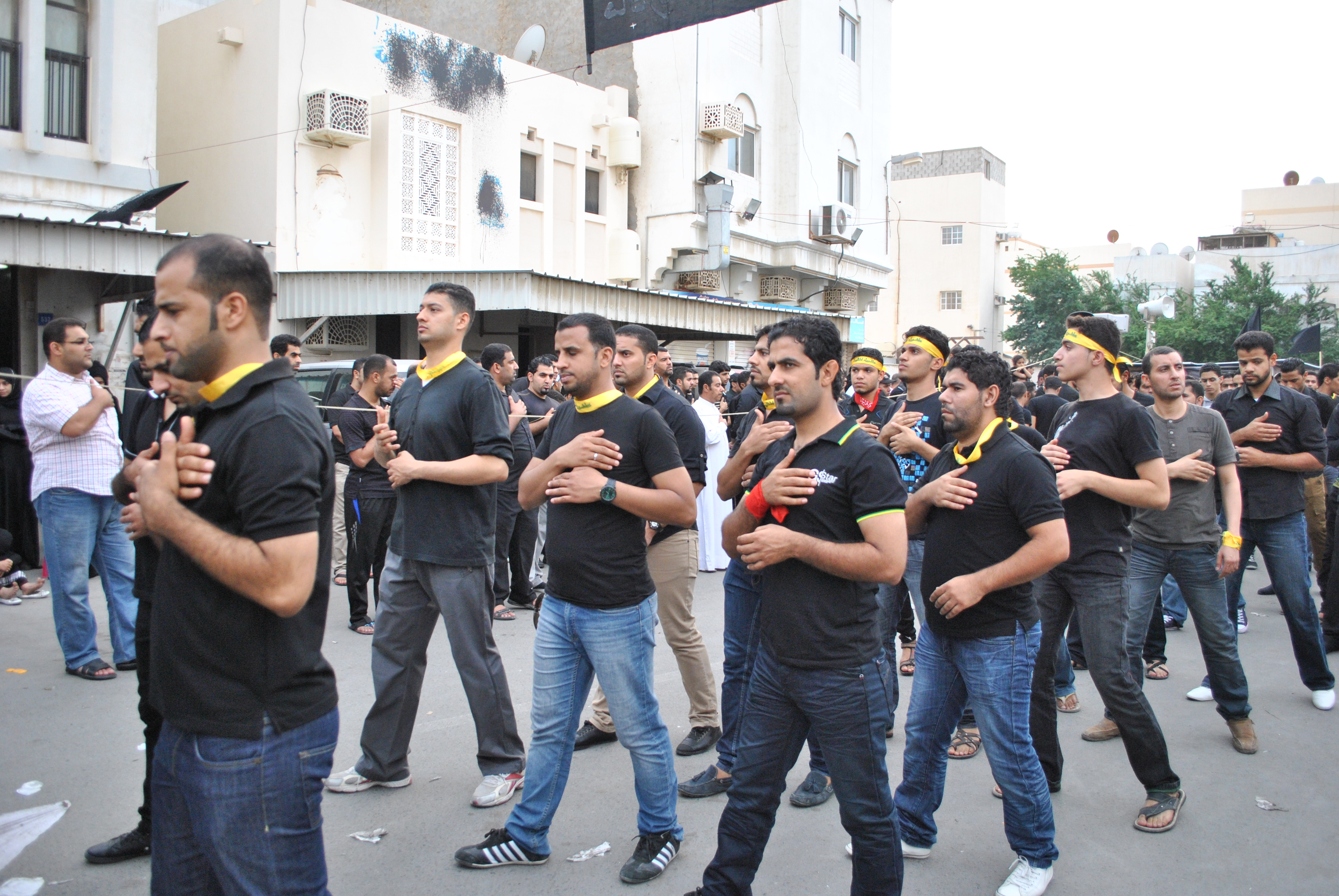
A procession in Bahrain.

The Islamic month of Muharram is a period of mourning in Shia Islam and commemorates the death of Imam Hussain, the third Imam, and his companions at the Battle of Karbala in 680 AD. Processions called Azadari (Arabic: عزاداری) are held to commemorate and remember the events that took place, these are often organised by congregation halls known as Hussainia. Mourning climaxes on the tenth day of Muharram, Ashura. The mourning is sometimes referred to as the Remembrance of Muharram (Arabic: ذكرى محرم).

The mourning that takes place during Muharram in Bahrain has a long history in the country, having been practiced for centuries, and the month sees a massive influx of visitors from neighbouring Persian Gulf countries, who spectate or participate in the mourning processions. What makes Bahrain special in the Persian Gulf area is that Hussaini processions are allowed openly on the streets; a reason why Shia Muslims in the region to travel to Bahrain during Muharram.

== Background ==
The event marks the anniversary of the Battle of Karbala when Imam Hussein ibn Ali, the grandson of the Islamic prophet Muhammad, and a Shia Imam, was killed by the forces of the second Umayyad caliph Yazid I. The month-long occasion is marked by arranging a series of daily gatherings, where a cleric would to deliver sermons on Islamic teachings and Imam Hussain's life. The mourning itself reaches its climax on the tenth day of Muharram, known as Ashura, on which the Umayyad army killed the 72 combatants who fought, including Imam Hussain, his family and close supporters. The women and children left living were made prisoners and transported to Yazid's court in Damascus.

== Commemoration in Bahrain ==
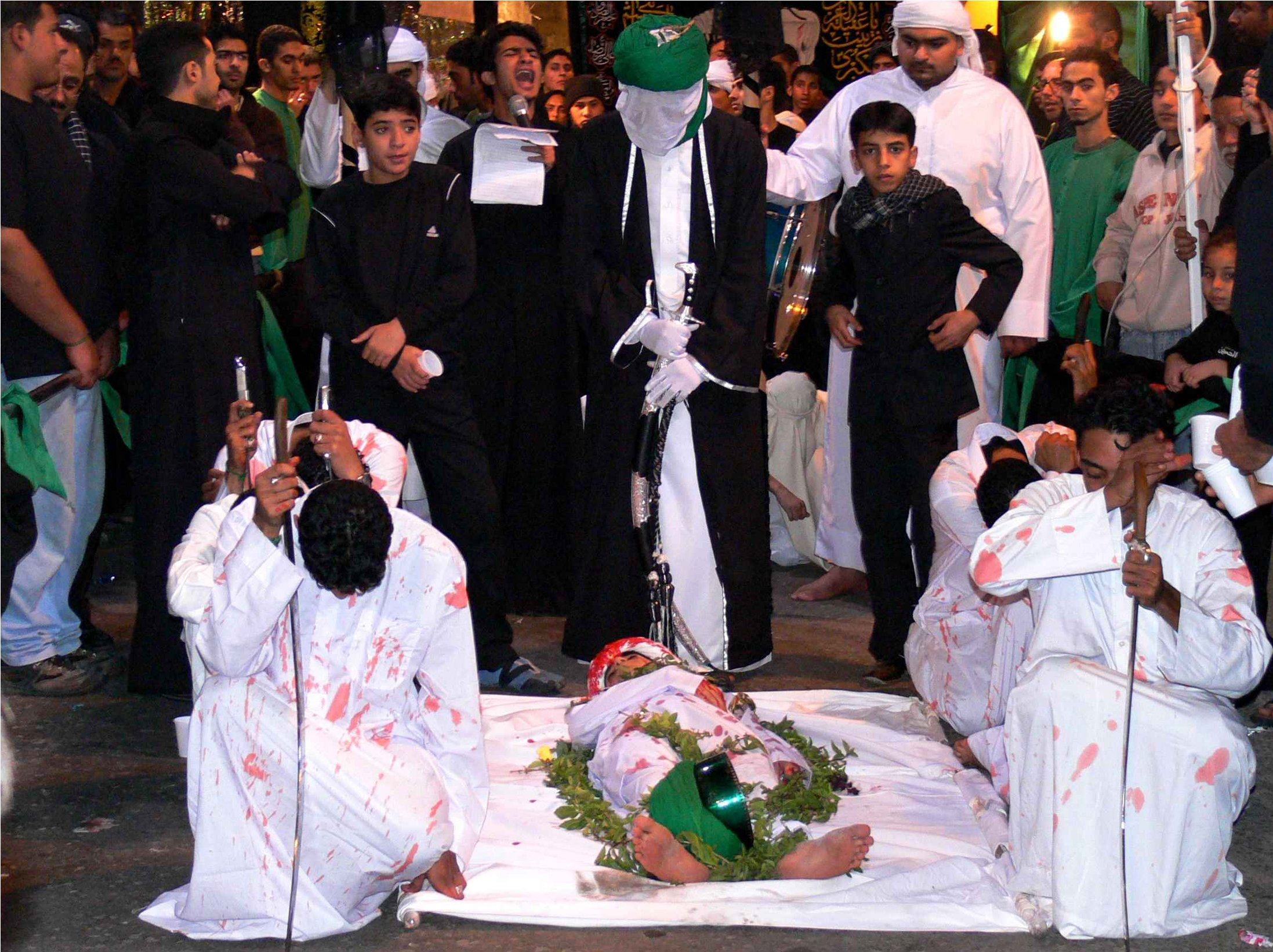
Reenactments of the events of Ashura, in Manama, Bahrain, in 2007.

=== History ===
The first outdoor Muharram procession in Bahrain is reported to have taken place in Manama in 1891, led by Mirza Muhammad Ismail, the local agent for the British-India Steam Navigation Company. Historian Nelida Fuccaro describes the event as:

This was a momentuous even for Manama's Shi'is. People flocked behind a heavily armed Mirza Isma'il who proudly made his way through Manama's streets in defiance of the veto imposed by the rulers on public manifestations of Shi'i devotion.

In the 1950s, when Bahrain saw the rise of a nationalist movement, the procession of the ma'tam (Hussainia) of Ras Rumman marched chanting nationalist slogans preceded by the banner of Gamal Abdel Nasser's Egypt.

The oldest and most distinguished of the mawatim (sing. ma'tam) in Bahrain are located in the Fareej el-Makharqa quarter of central Manama and were constructed at the turn of the 19th century. This includes Matam al-Ajam al-Kabeer, Matam Bin Rajab, Bin Zabar, Madan, Sallum, Al Mudaifa, Al Arrayedh, Al Qassab, and al Hajj Khalaf.

=== Practices and rituals ===
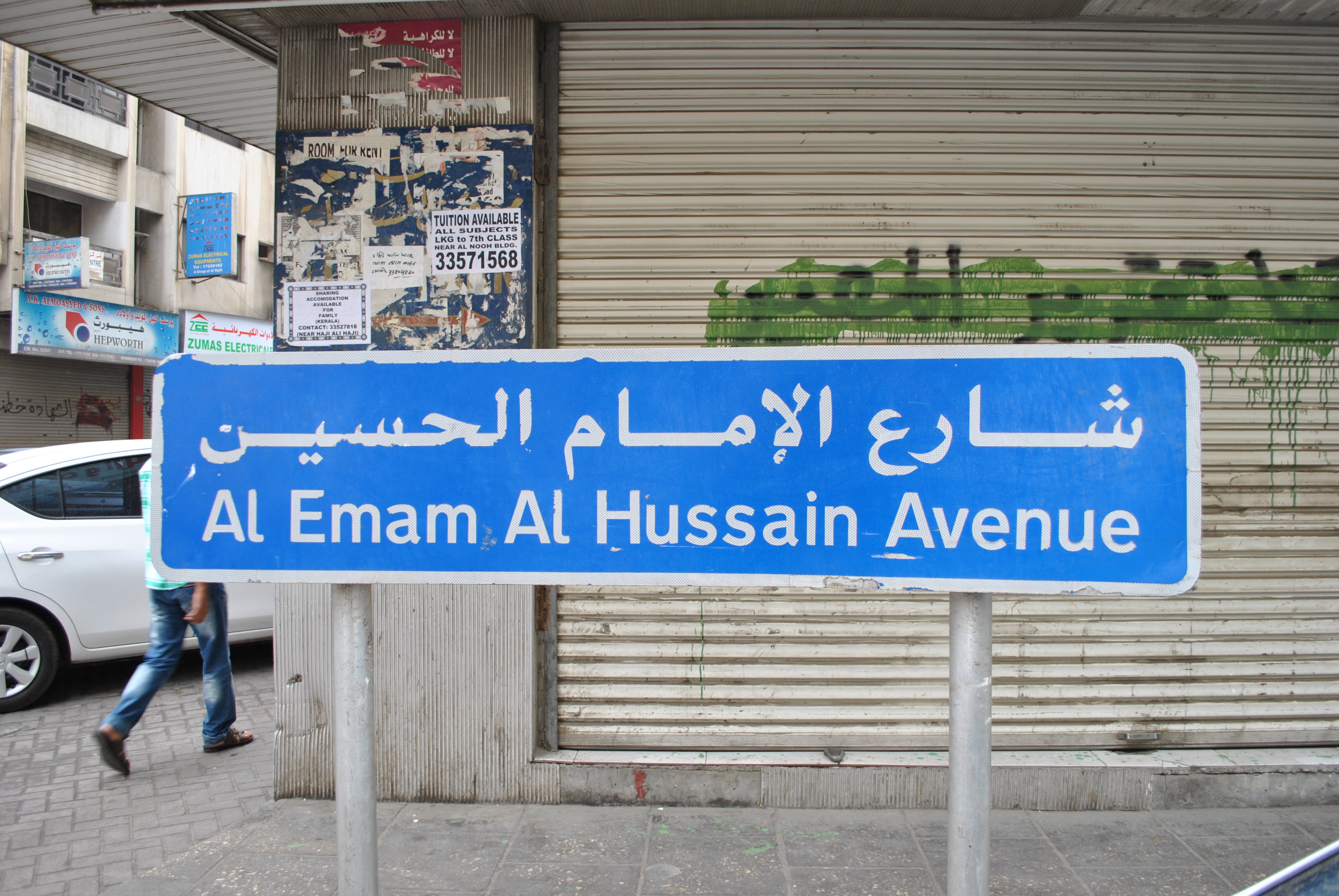
Imam Hussain Avenue in central Manama is a focal point for Muharram processions.

Muharram in Bahrain is unique, as it is the only Arab country in the Persian Gulf region that has a Shia Muslim majority. It has been estimated that thousands of Gulf nationals visit Bahrain during Ashura to participate in the religious processions. Although official statistics in 2009 show that only 1,100 matams (مأتم) are officially registered in the country, it is believed that there are up to 5,000 matams, including both registered and unregistered.

Processions (Azadari) occur on an almost-daily basis during the month. Different varieties of the processions exist: Some processions consist of participants beating the chests, others with self-flagellations with chains and hitting oneself with swords or knives (called "Haidar"). Ta'ziyeh and reenactments of the Day of Ashura are also performed.

Ashura is a two-day public holiday in Bahrain, occurring on the ninth and tenth days of Muharram, respectively (though dates vary on the Gregorian calendar). According to the government sources, the Bahraini government "actively donates food and funds" to matams during the month-long event.

== Notable Matams ==
A matam is a Shia congregation hall, also called as a Hussainia. As matams number in the thousands, notable ones are listed below:

- Matam al-Ajam al-Kabeer
- Matam Bin Rajab

== Gallery ==
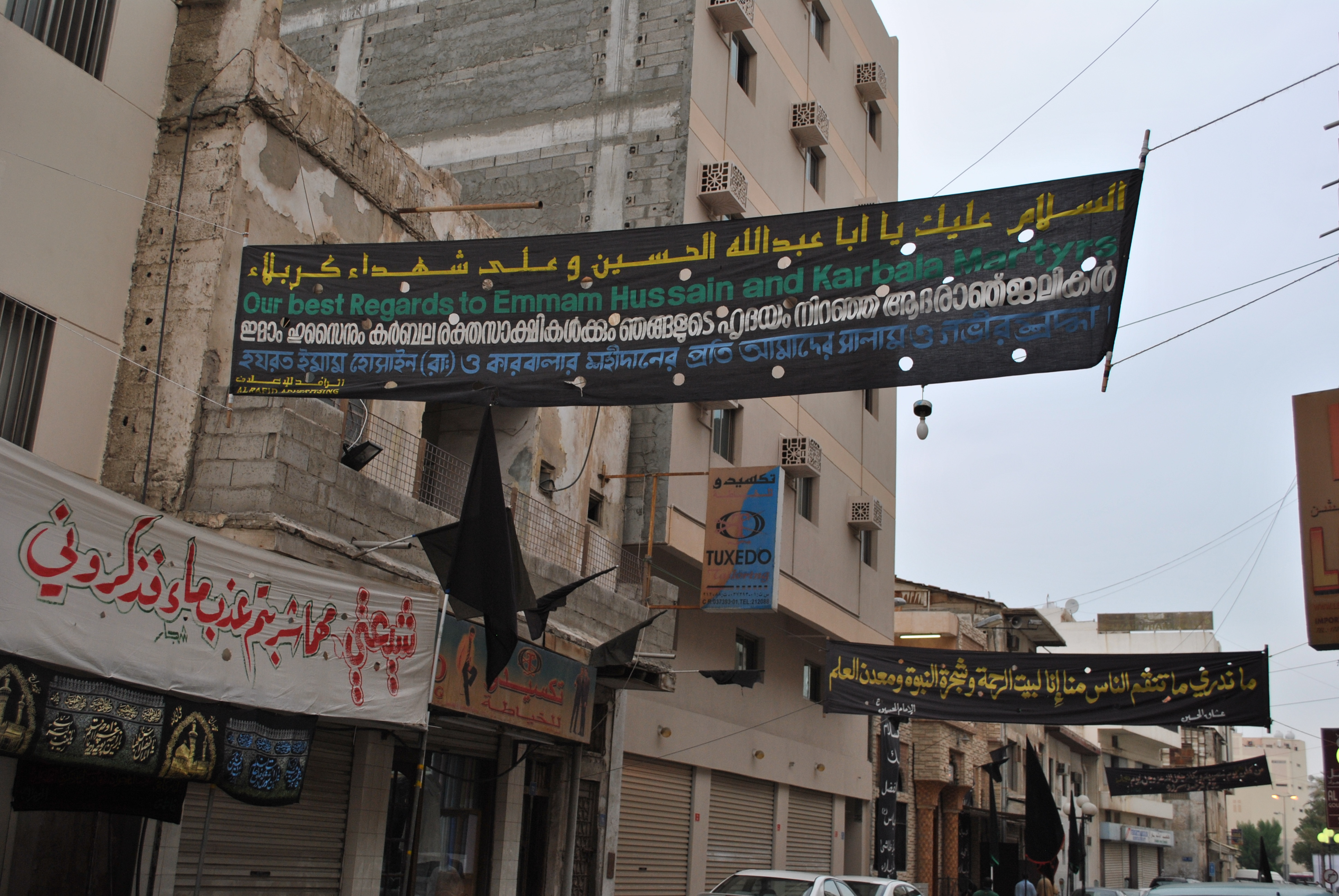
An Ashura banner written in four languages; Arabic, English, Malayalam, and Bengali.

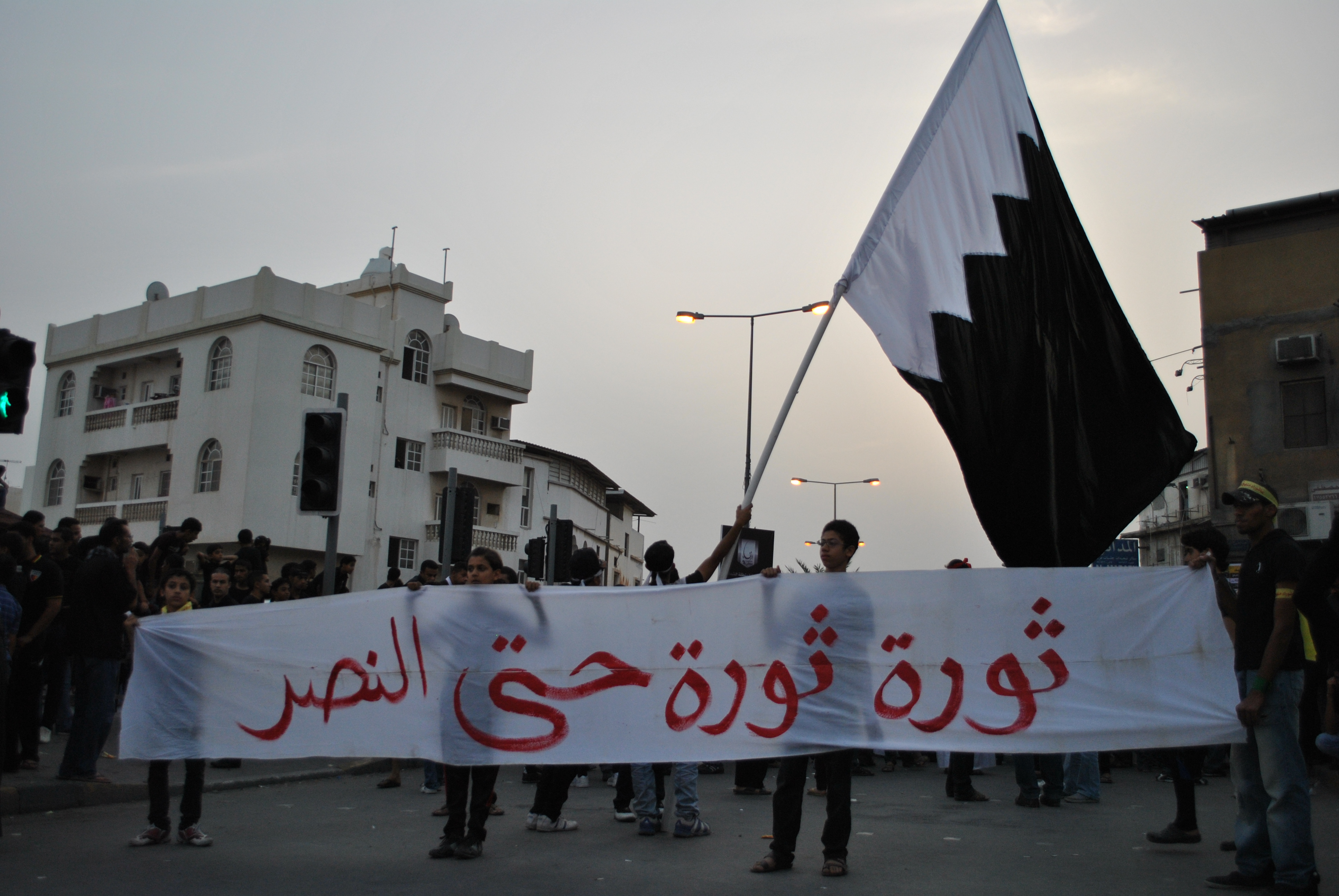
A Bahraini flag with black colour instead of red.

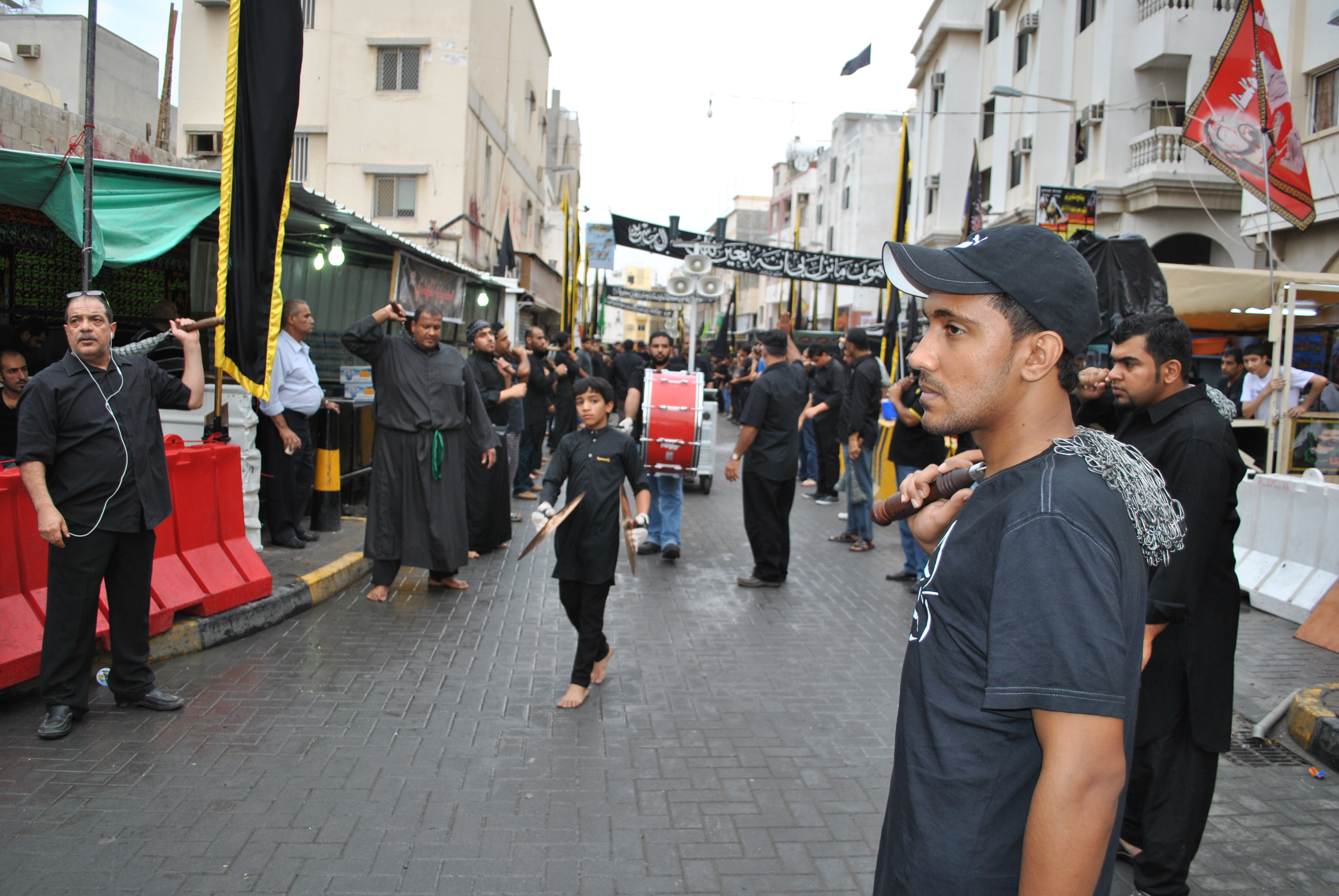
A flagellation march in Manama, Bahrain.

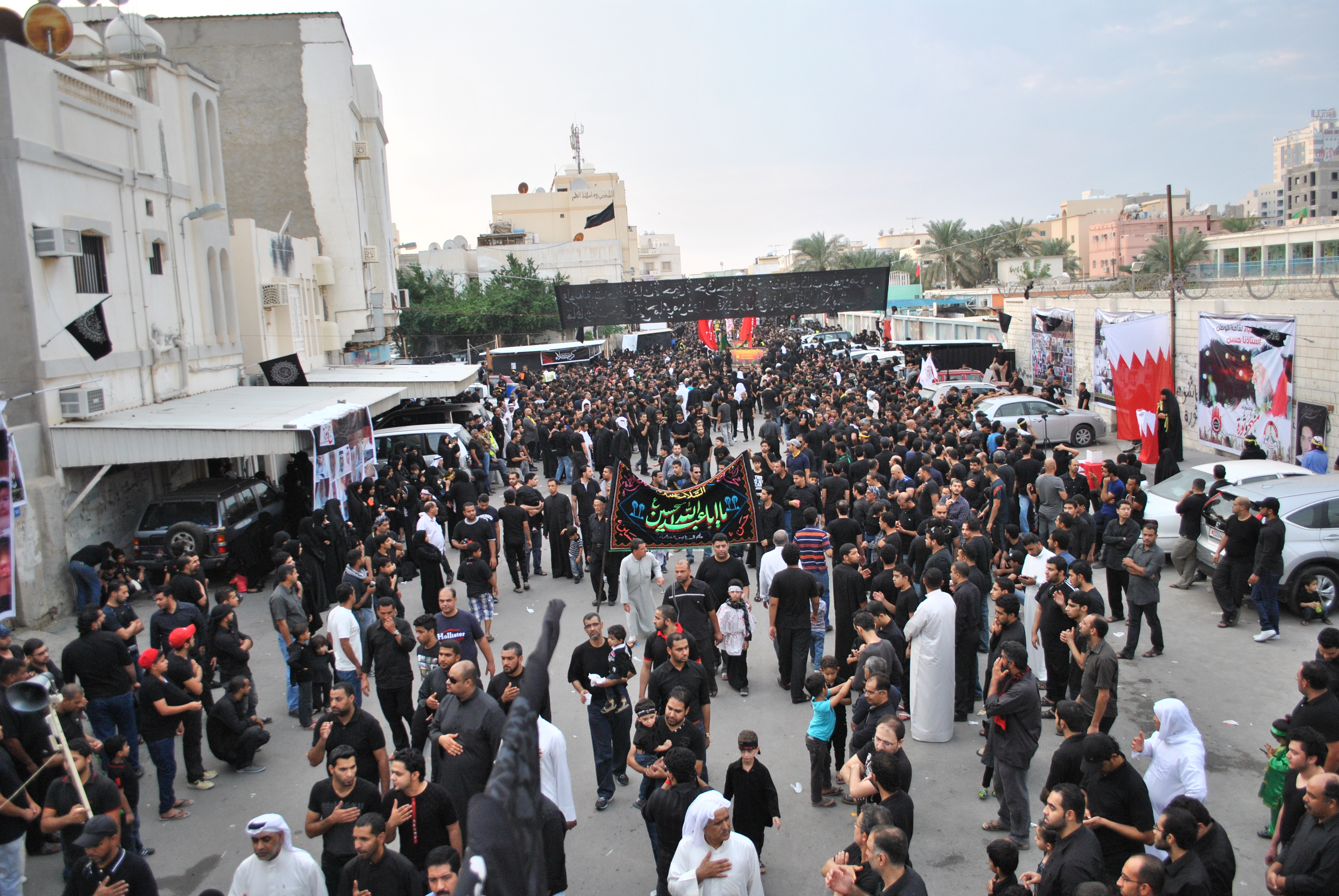
Procession in Sanabis

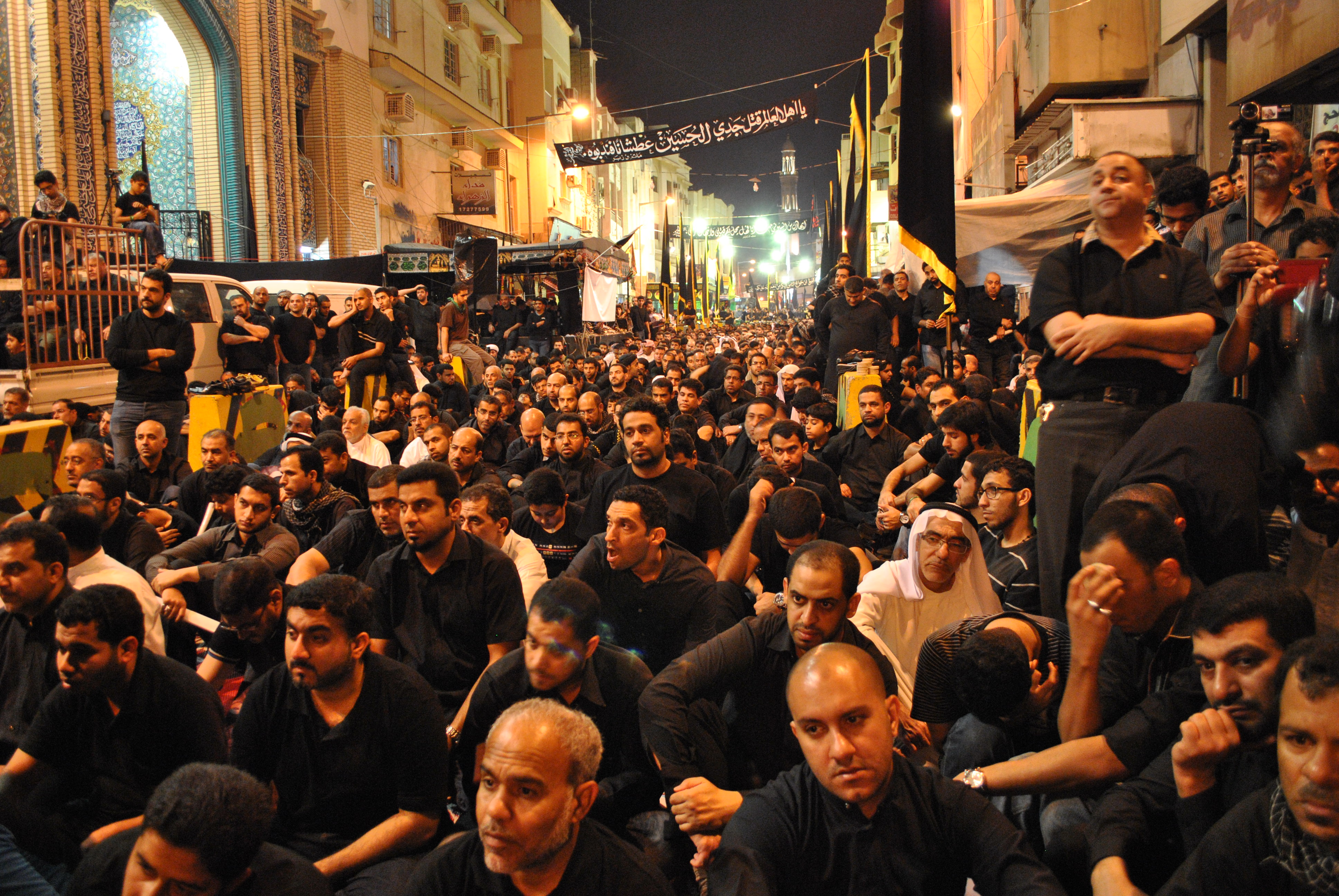
Muslims listen to a speech on the eve of Ashura in Manama.

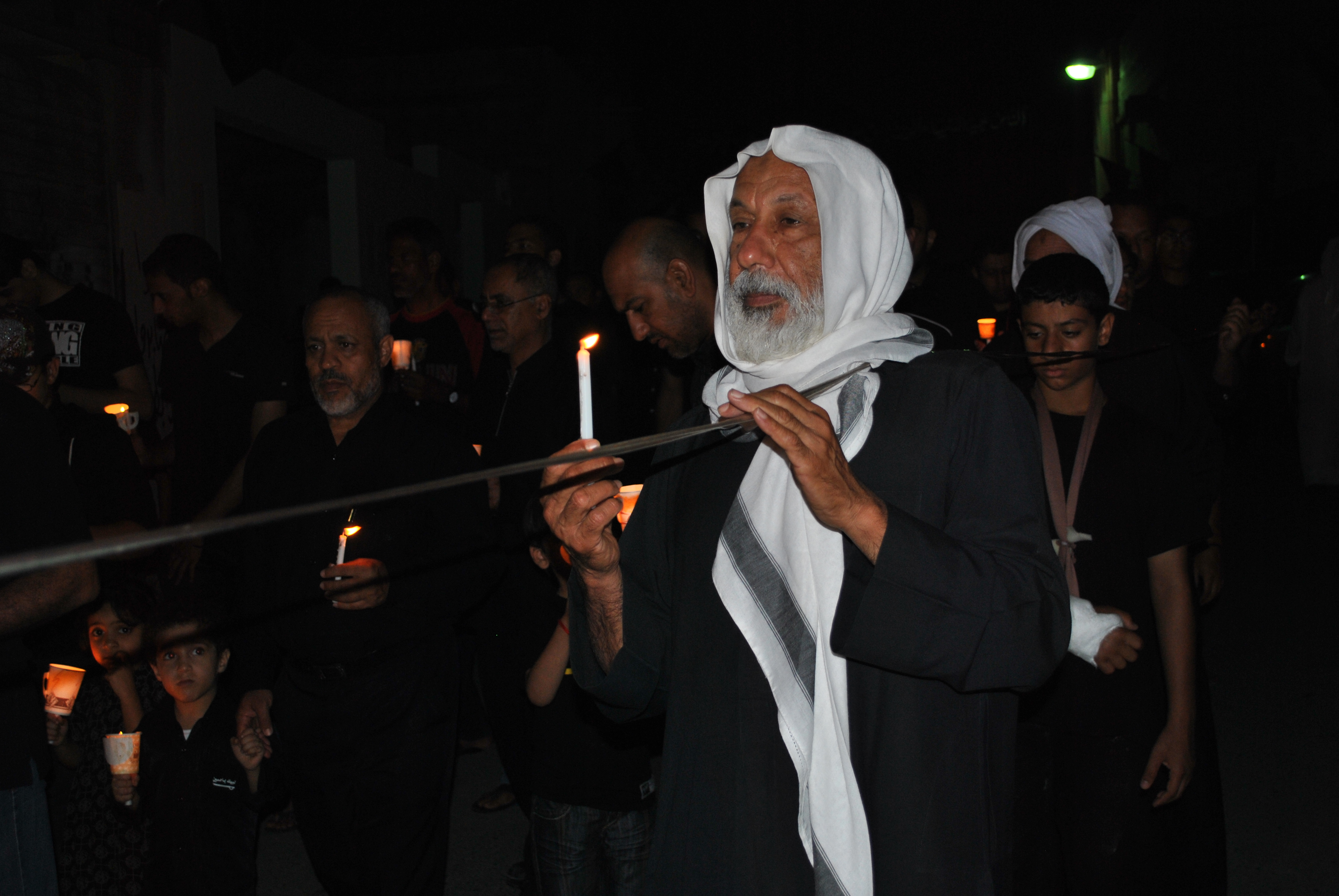
Bahraini Shia Muslims participate in a candle march.

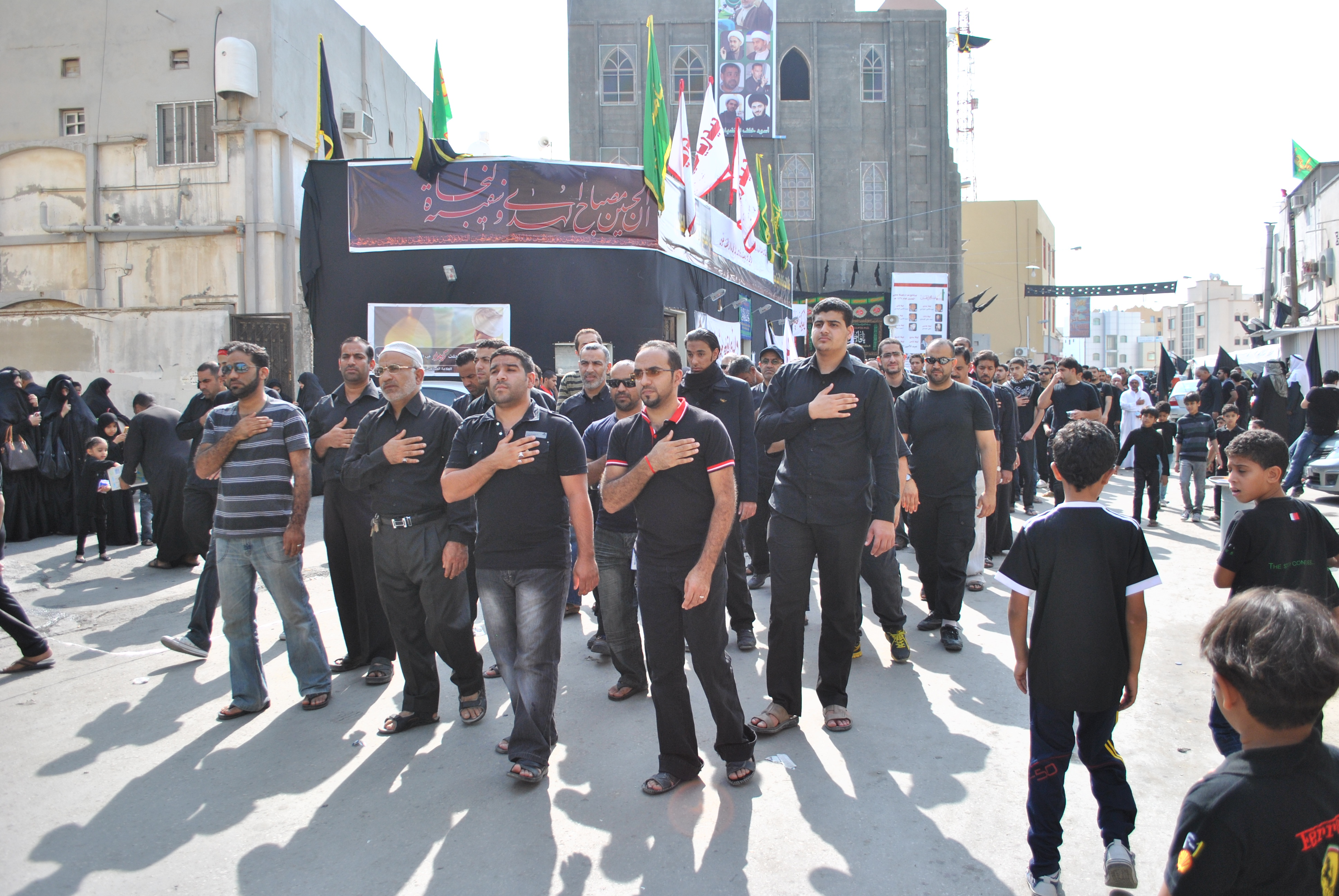
Muslims strike their chests as they march to mark the Day of Ashura.

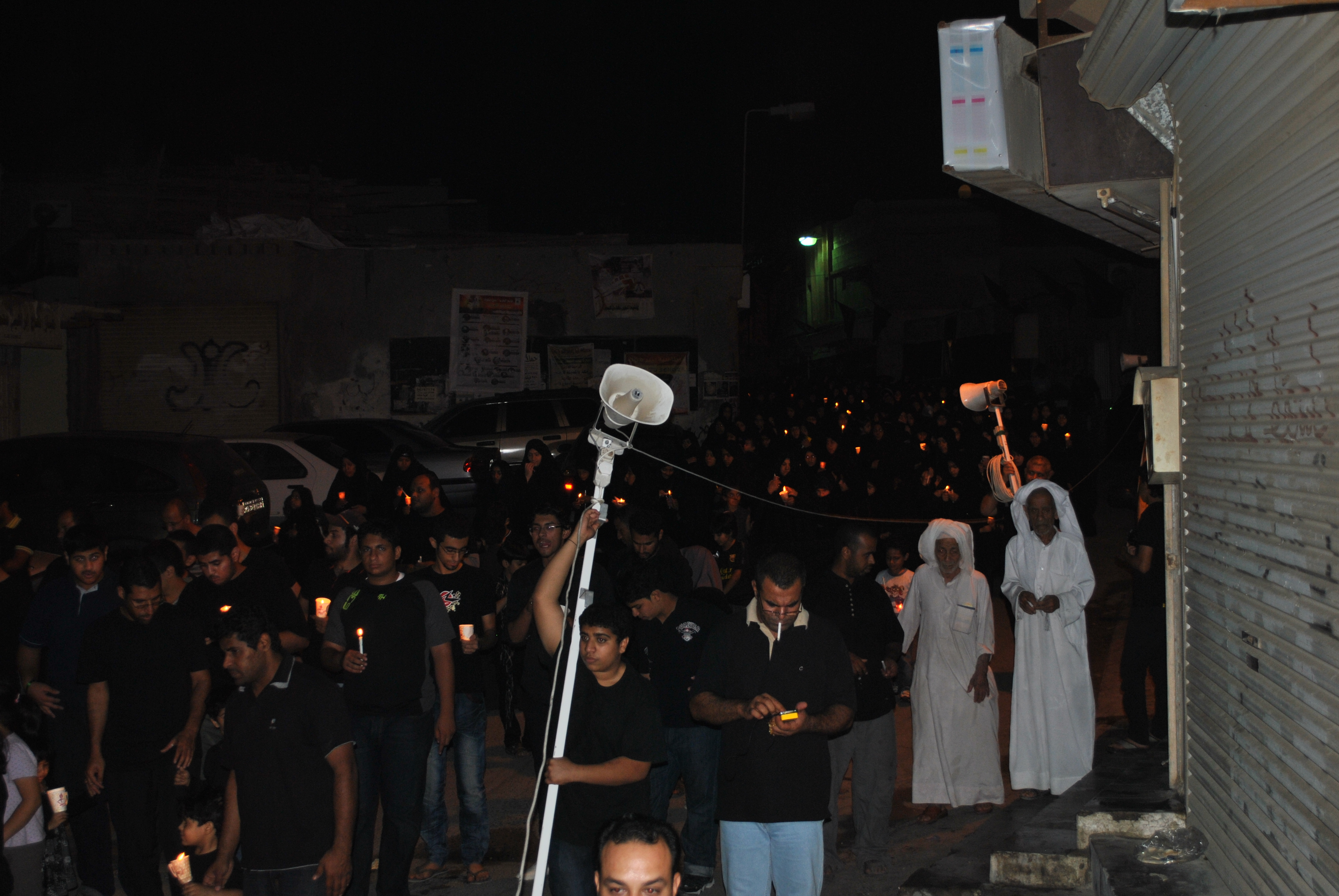
Candle march in Manama

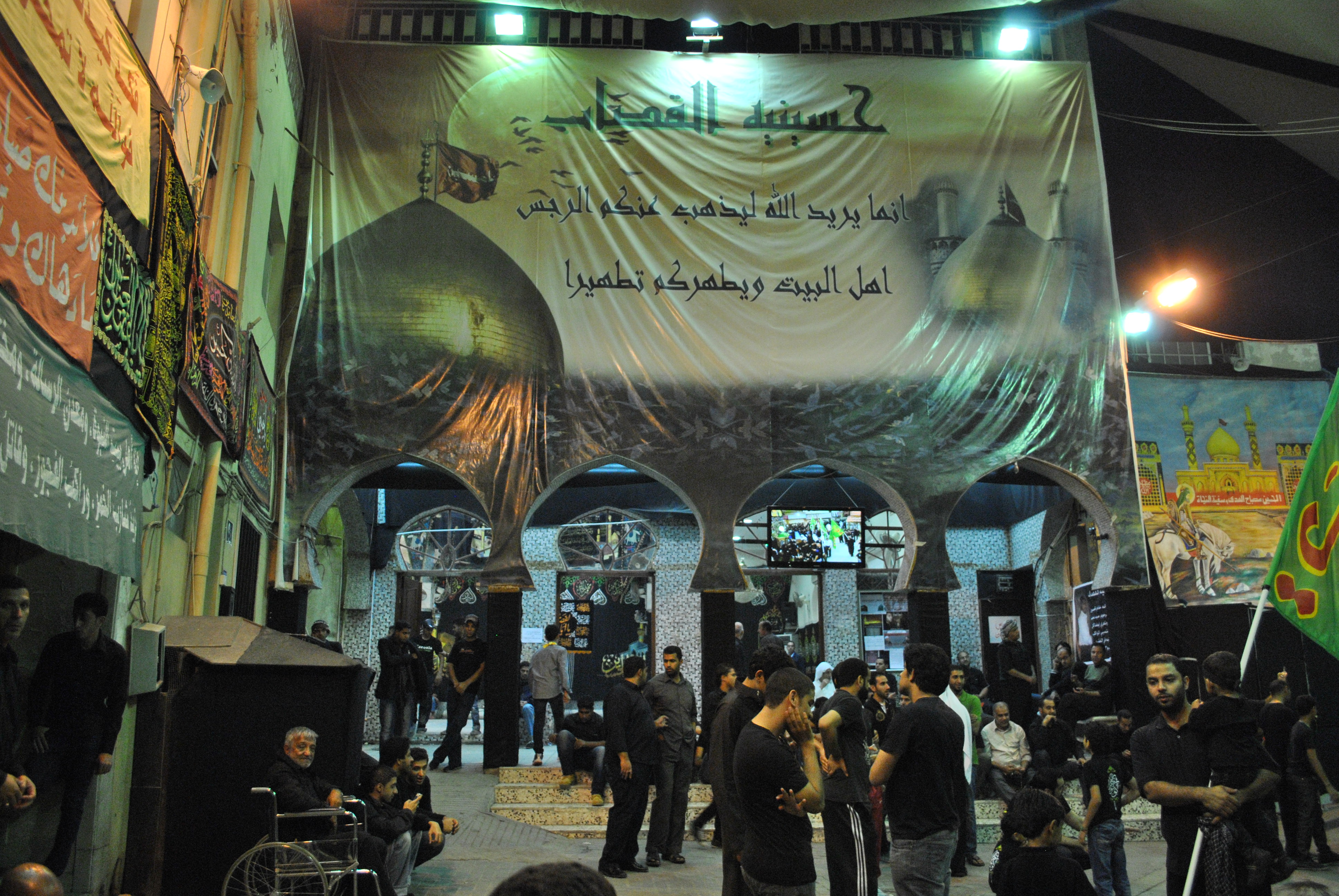
The Hussainia of Qassab, a starting point for processions.

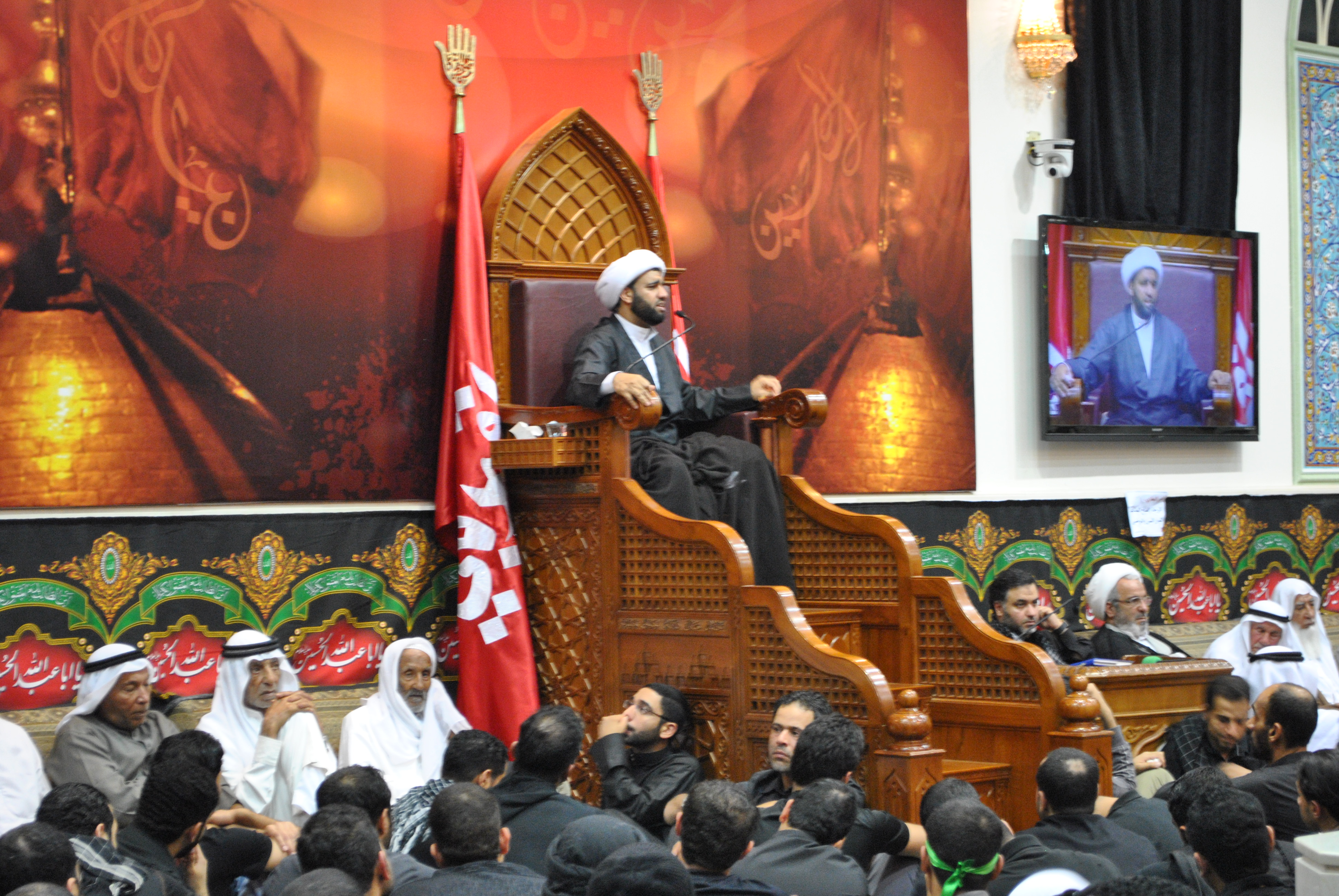
Cleric delivers a sermon in Sanabis.

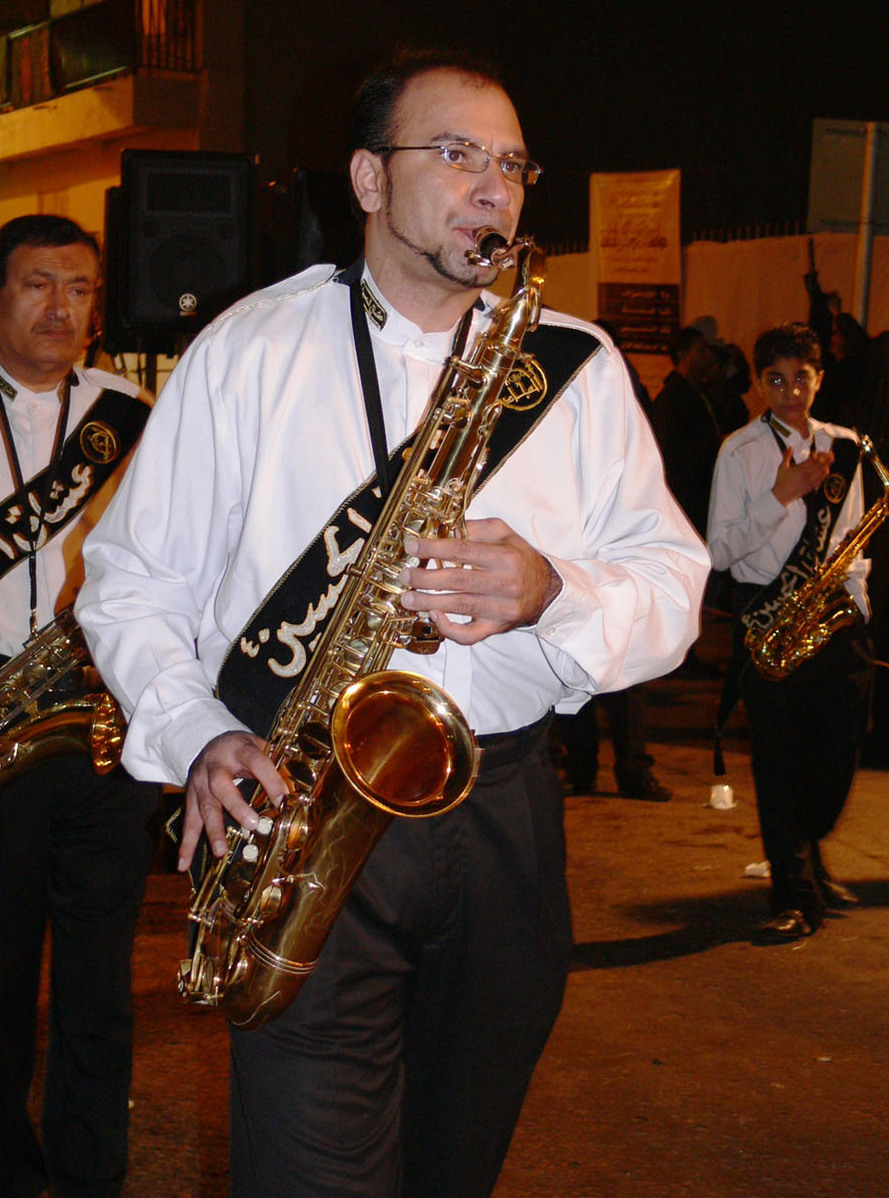
Music band playing during Ashura.

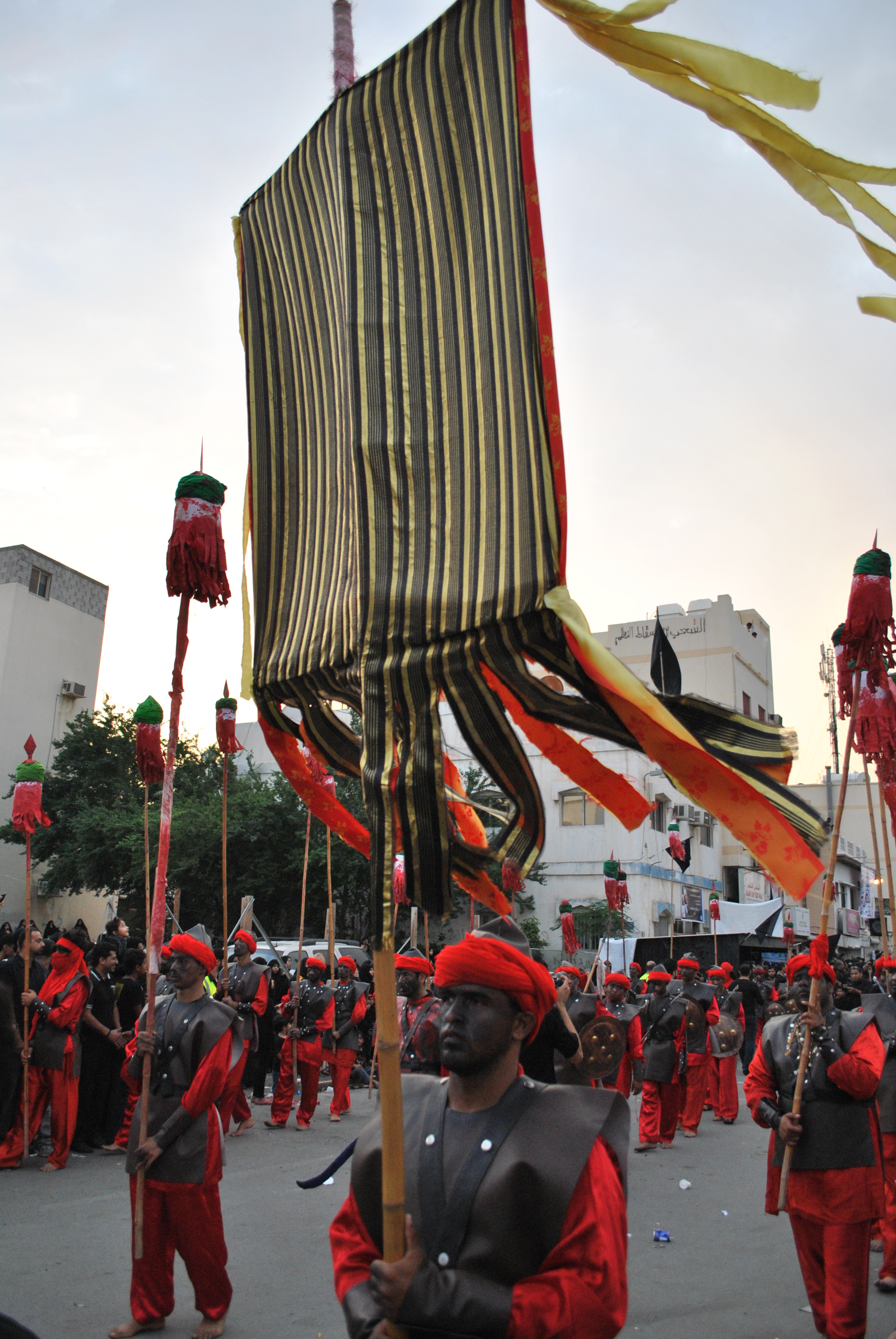
Theatrical reenactment of the aftermath of the Battle of Karbala

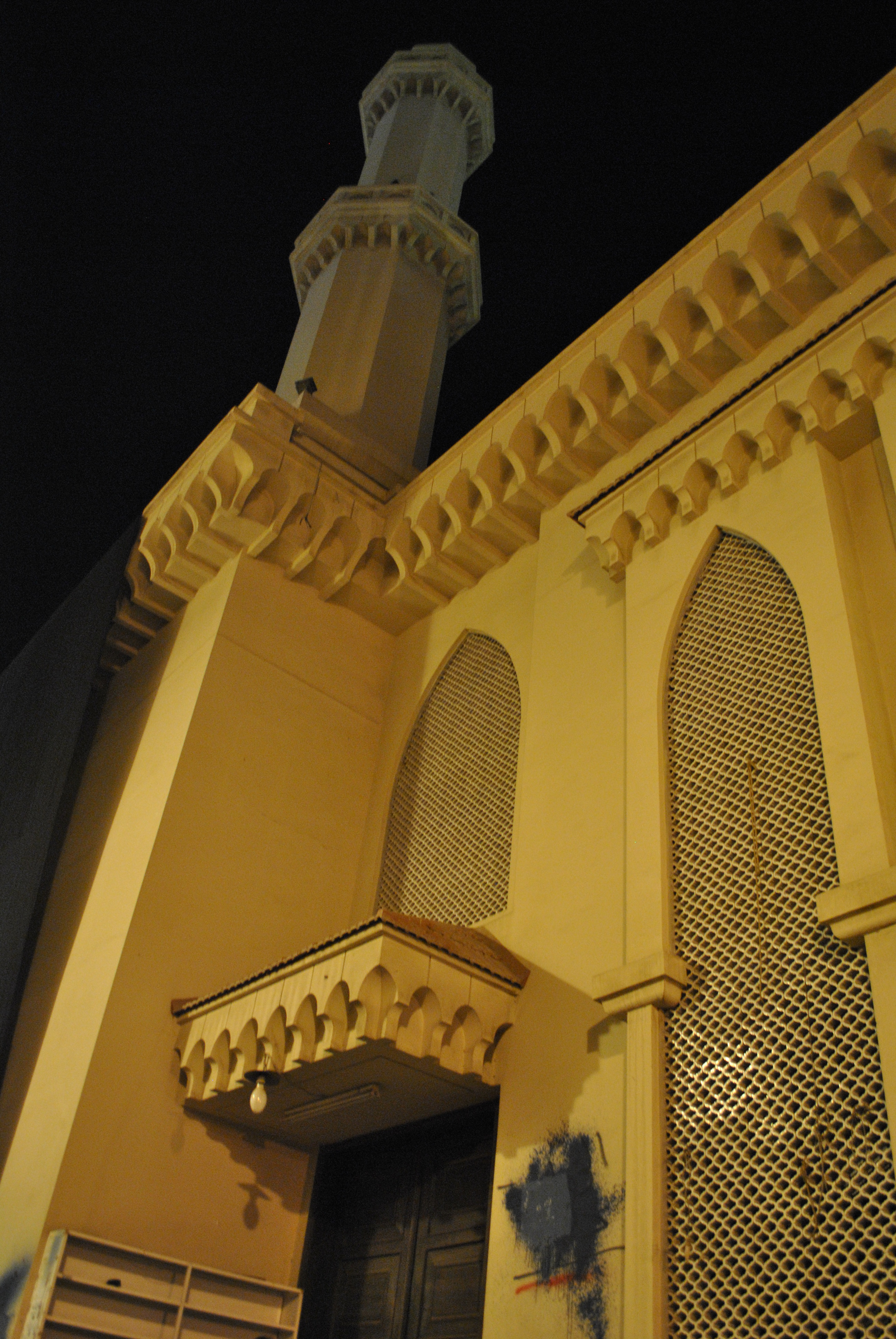
Al Khawaja mosque during Muharram in 2012, note the black cloth draping the western side of the mosque.

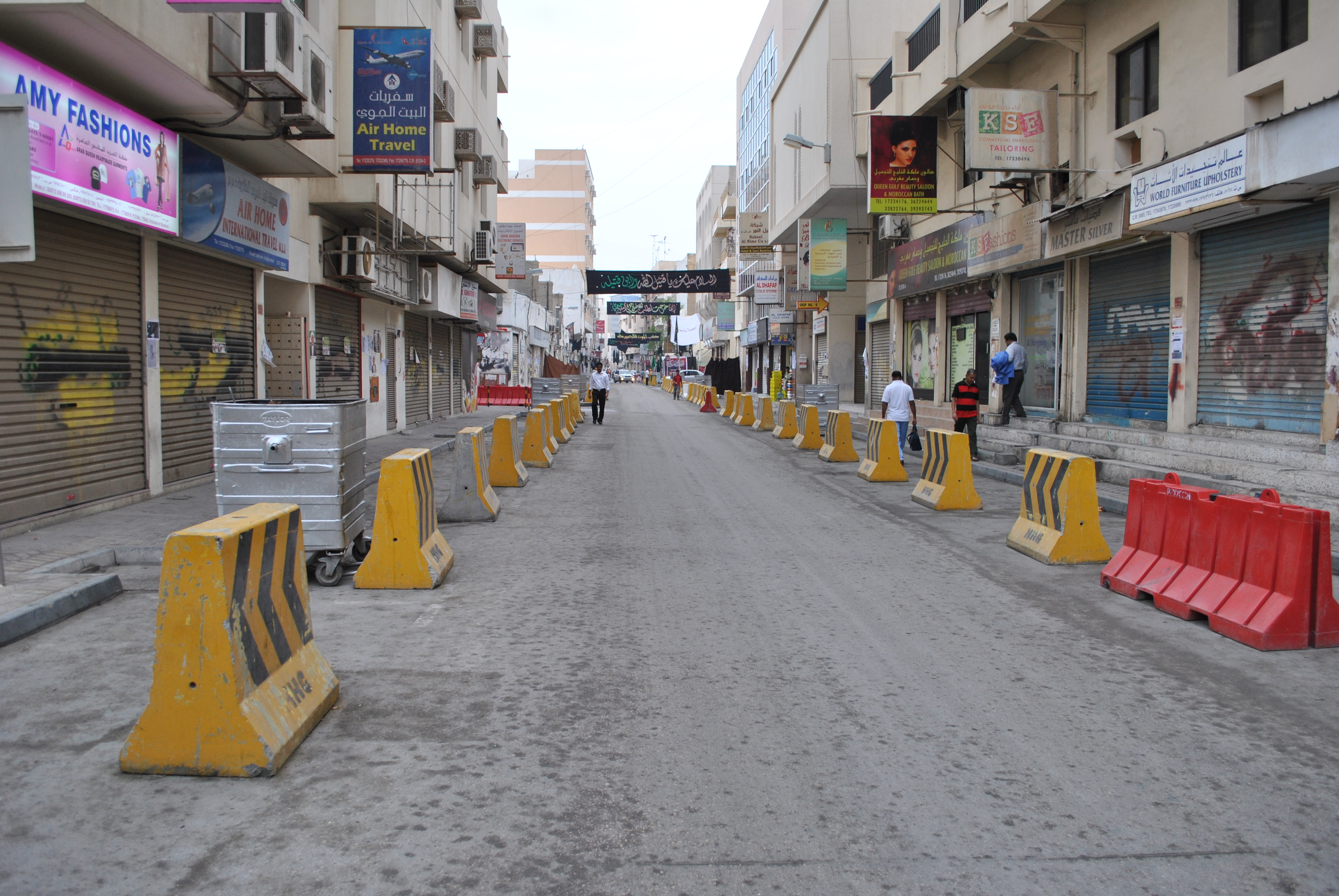
A typical road in Manama during Muharram, prior to the passing of a procession.
