= Fareej el-Makharqa =

Neighbourhood of Manama

Map of Manama in 1926.

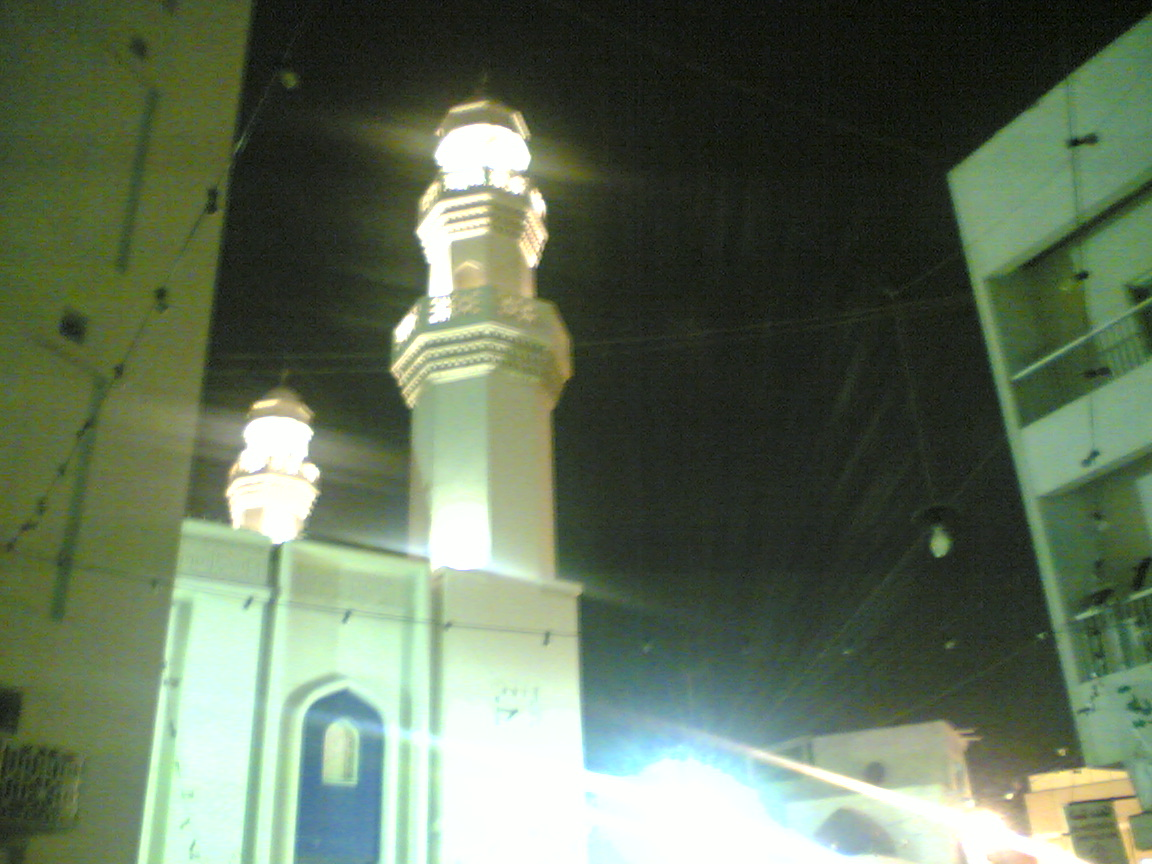
The Masjid Mu'min Mosque.

Fareej el-Makharqa or Al-Makharga (Arabic: فريج المخارقة) is a neighborhood in the heart of Manama, the capital of Bahrain. It is adjacent to Fareej el-Hammam, Fareej el-Hatab, Fareej el-Fadhel, and Gudaibiya.

== Matams ==
Some of the matams or hussainias in Al Makharga are:

- Matam Bin Rajab, مأتم بن رجب, first Matam in Manama
- Matam Madan, مأتم مدن
- Matam Bin Zabar
- Matam Alajam Alkabeer, مأتم العجم الكبير
- Matam Algassab, مأتم القصاب
- Matam Bin Saloom, مأتم بن سلوم
- Matam Alahsaiyeen, مأتم الأحسائيين
- Matam Aljahramiya, مأتم الجهرمية
- Matam Alajah, مأتم العجة
- Matam Bin Khalaf, مأتم بن خلف
- Matam Dashti, مأتم دشتي
- Matam AlBad'e, مأتم البدع
- Matam Abu Aqlain, مأتم أبو عقلين
- Matam Al Aghtam, مأتم الأغتم
