= Al Zamil Tower =

Skyscraper in Bahrain

Coordinates: 26°14′12″N 50°34′51″E

Al Zamil Tower is an office tower situated in the Fareej el-Fadhel district of Manama, in the island state of Bahrain.

The site is close to the Central Business District of the country and just across from Government House. The building's architecture has been praised for "harmonious combination(s) between tradition and modernity" and features a gateway road that intersects the building to the Manama souq.

== Construction ==
Designed by a team led by Souheil El-Masri at Bahraini architecture firm Gulf House Engineering, construction on the skyscraper started in 2001 and concluded in 2005. The 21-storey tower covers a total area of 30,000 square metres of space and has parking facilities for 154 cars. It won the Aga Khan Award for Architecture in 2007.
