= Fareej el-Fadhel =

Coordinates: 26°14′2.13″N 50°34′51.41″E

Map of Manama in 1926, showing the al-Fadhel neighbourhood (grey).

Fareej el-Fadhel (Arabic: فريج الفاضل) is a core district of Manama, neighbouring the Manama Souq, in the Kingdom of Bahrain. It is adjacent to Fareej el-Makharqa. Along with the other districts of the souq in Manama, it formed the core districts of the city prior to the expansion of the city in the 20th century.

Unlike other districts in the Manama Souq, Fareeq el-Fadhel used to be inhabited by Omanis, Indians (especially the Buhra) and Jewish families, alongside the Baharna.

Although it used to be a predominantly Bahrani Shi'a district, according to Ahmad Matar, both Shi'a and Sunnis mourned Imam Hussain and celebrated other religious and national celebrations together.

== See also ==
- Muharram in Bahrain
