= Fareej el-Hatab =

Coordinates: 26°13′58.59″N 50°34′46.79″E

Map of Manama in 1926.

Fareej el-Hatab (Arabic: فريج الحطب، Fareej el-Hatab) is an old district close to the Manama Souq, in the heart of Manama in the Kingdom of Bahrain. It is located adjacent to Fareej el-Makharqa. Along with the other districts in the souq, it formed the core districts of Manama prior to the expansion of the city in the 20th century. The first Matam in all of Manama, Matam Bin Rajab, is located in Fareeq el-Hatab.
