= Mai bint Mohammed Al Khalifa =

Bahraini politician

Styles of Sheikha Mai bint Mohammed Al Khalifa
- Reference style: Her Excellency
- Spoken style: Your Excellency
- Alternative style: Sheikha

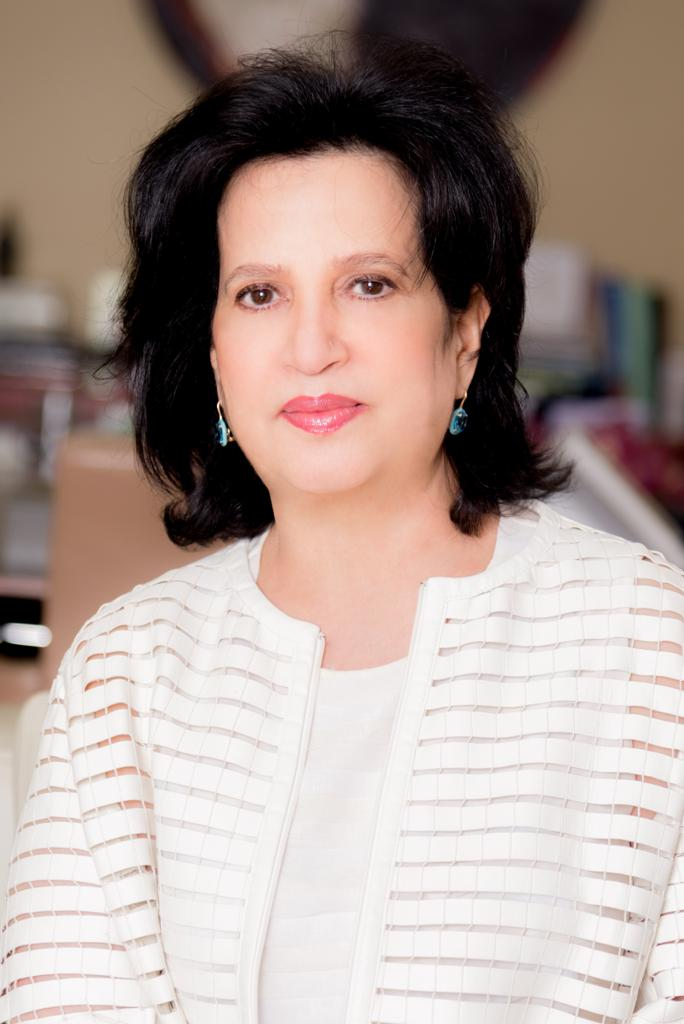

Mai bint Mohammed Al Khalifa is a Bahraini politician and former government minister.

== Biography ==
Sheika Mai bint Mohammed Al Khalifa was appointed Minister of Information in Bahrain in 2009; she was the first woman to become the Information Minister in Bahrain. She is the Chairperson of the Board of the Arab Regional Centre for World Heritage and the former President of the Bahrain Authority for Culture and Antiquities. She served as the Minister of Culture of Bahrain. In 2014 in the Forbes Middle East list of most powerful Arab women she was listed as number six. She visited the sole synagogue in Bahrain in February 2014 and proposed plans to renovate it. As the culture minister she has worked to encourage artists in Bahrain. Her daughter, Hala bint Mohammed Al Khalifa, became Bahrain's Director General of Culture and Arts.

In the World Monuments Fund’s 50th Anniversary on 21 October 2015 in New York City, Mai bint Mohammed Al Khalifa was awarded the Watch Award for her role in preserving the monuments and culture of Bahrain. In 2017 she was made the Special Ambassador of the International Year of Sustainable Tourism for Development by the United Nations World Tourism Organization (UNWTO).

In 2020, Sheika Mai was nominated by the Government of Bahrain as Secretary General of the World Tourism Organization. In January 2021, incumbent Secretary General Zurab Pololikashvili won the election at the 113th session of the Executive Council.

In 2022, Sheika Mai was dismissed from her position as the President of the Bahrain Authority for Culture and Antiquities. According to the Middle East Eye and Doha News, she refused to shake hands with the Israeli ambassador to Bahrain. Following this event, which happened in the United States ambassador Steve C. Bondy’s residence, the King ordered her removal from office.

== Publications ==
- Al Khalifa, Mai Mohammed (1996). محمد بن خليفة، ٣١٨١-٠٩٨١ م [Mohammed bin Khalifa, 1981-1983 AD] (in Arabic). Michigan: University of Michigan. ISBN 9782910355548.
- Al Khalifa, Mai Mohammed (1999). مائة عام من التعليم النظامي في البحرين/ السنوات الأولى للتأسيس [One Hundred Years Of Formal Education In Bahrain/The Early Years Of Establishment] (in Arabic). Michigan: University of Michigan.
- Al Khalifa, Mai Mohammed (2019). The Qarmatians, From Concept to State. Pennsauken, NJ: BookBaby. ISBN 978-1543981179.
