= Hala bint Mohammed Al Khalifa =

Bahraini politician

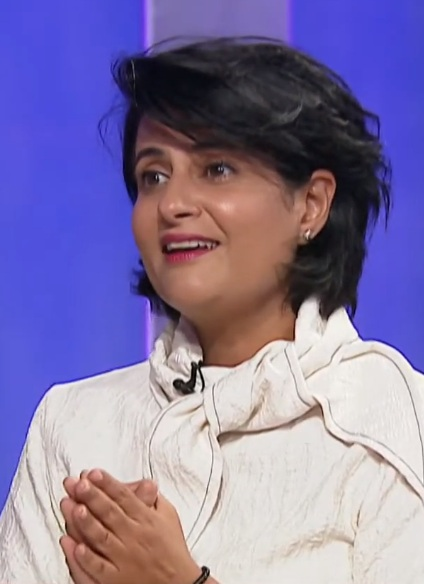
- in 2020
- Born: 1977 (age 48–49)
- Education: Tufts University and the Slade School of Fine Art
- Employer: The Museum of Islamic Art in Doha
- Known for: Bahrain's Director General of the Culture and Arts
- Children: two sons

Hala bint Mohammed Al Khalifa (Arabic: هلا بنت محمد آل خليفة; born 1977) is a Bahraini politician and artist who became Bahrain's Director General of the Culture and Arts. She was educated in Fine Art in Boston and in London and she lectured at the University of Bahrain.

== Life ==
She was born in about 1977. Her mother is Sheika Mai bint Mohammed Al Khalifa. She began learning about art when she was ten. Her mother encouraged her talents hiring an art tutor for her. She studied at Boston's Tufts University graduating in 1999 and she achieved a master's degree at the Slade School of Fine Art in London in 2002. She taught art at the University of Bahrain.

In 2008 she became the head of education at the Museum of Islamic Art in Doha. Her work in Doha was disrupted when the diplomatic crisis with Qatar happened, but the Fire Station Artist in Residence project which she had begun in 2015 continued. Her own art works have been bought by Doha's Mathaf Museum, the Jordan National Gallery of Fine Arts in Amman, Bahrain's National Museum and the Saudi Art Council.

She became Bahrain's Director General of the Culture and Arts and she was a colleague of her mother. Her mother mentored her and she led the Bahrain Authority for Culture and Antiquities. Her mother was sacked by Royal decree in 2022 and replaced by Khalifa bin Ahmed bin Abdulla Al Khalifa. Her mother had been known for her disregard for some government ministers, but the reason was said to be that she showed disrespect for an Israeli envoy when both were being hosted by the American ambassador.

== Private life ==
She has one son and one daughter.
