= Ebrahim ibn Khalifa Al Khalifa =

Bahraini politician

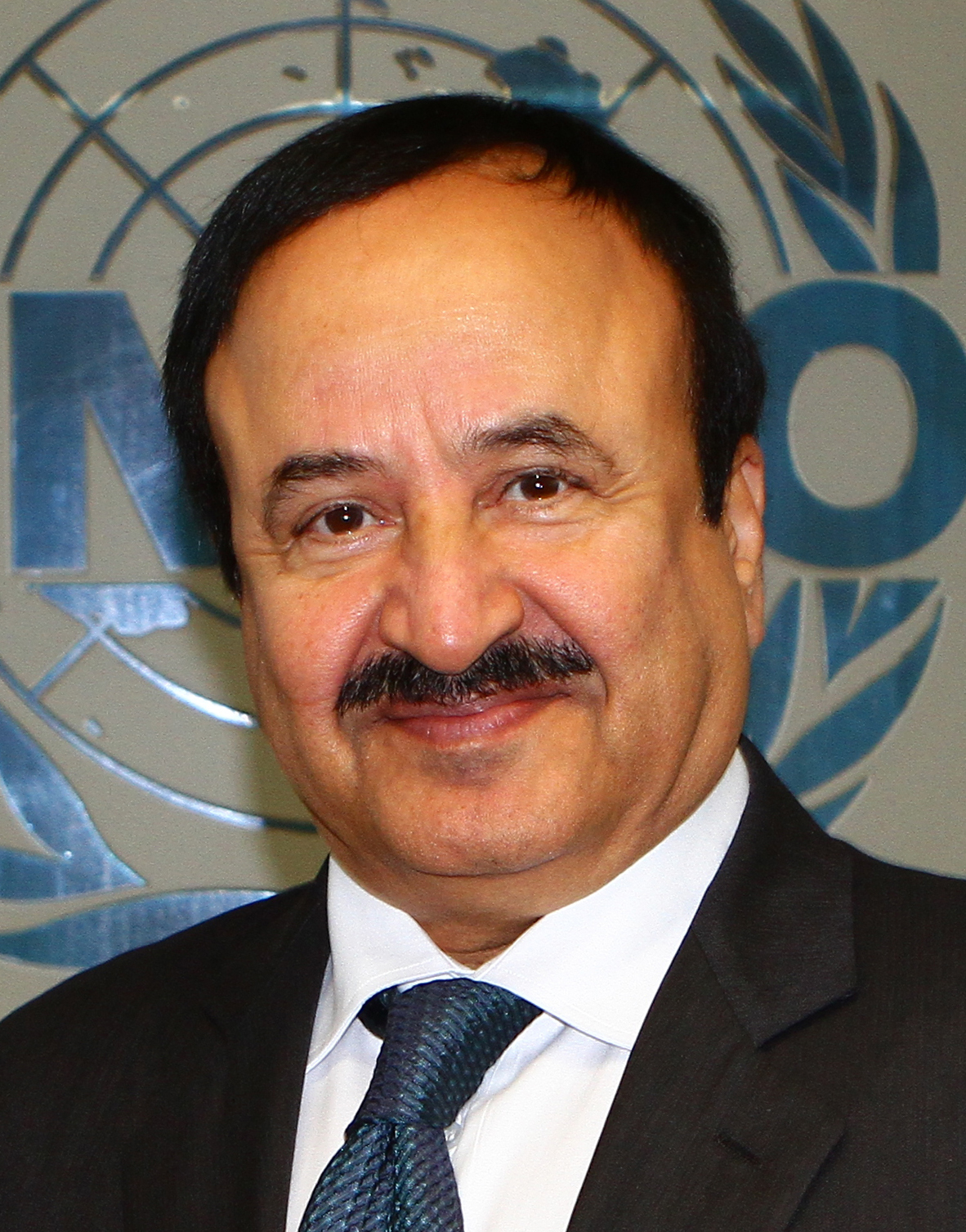
Ebrahim bin Khalifa Al Khalifa

Ebrahim bin Khalifa Al Khalifa (Arabic: الشيخ ابراهيم بن خليفة آل خليفة) is the former minister of housing of Bahrain.

== Career ==
Sheikh Ebrahim bin Khlifa Al Khalifa has held the position minister of housing of the Kingdom of Bahrain from December 2007 to 2011, and was replaced by Majeed Al Alwai in the post.

He also holds the posts of chairman of the Housing Bank and Chairman of Ebda Bank.

A graduate of law, Sheikh Ebrahim has held a number of key positions in the Kingdom of Bahrain. A former undersecretary of finance (1993 to 2007), he has also been the deputy governor of Bahrain Monetary Agency (now Central Bank of Bahrain) (1982 to 1993).

Sheikh Ebrahim has been chairman, Gulf International Bank; chairman of Bahrain Development Bank; chairman and managing director, Gulf Aluminium Rolling Mill Company (GARMCO); the chairman of Bahrain Institute of Technology. He is also a board member of Aluminium Bahrain (ALBA) and board member of Bahrain Petroleum Company (BAPCO).

Sheikh Ebrahim bin Khalifa Al Khalifa is a businessperson who has been at the head of xix different companies and presently holds the position of chairman at Bahrain World Economic Summit, Chairman of Accounting & Auditing Org For Islamic Financial Inst, chairman for Ebdaa Bank BSC and chairman of Bahraini Citizen LLB.

He is also on the board of Dar Al-Maal Al-Islami Trust and Faisal Islamic Bank of Egypt and Chairman of Arab Regional Center For Entrepreneurship & Investment.

Sheikh Al-Khalifa previously held the position of chairman of Meezan Bank Ltd.

He received a graduate degree from Beirut Arab University.
