= Abdullah Al Muharraqi =

Bahraini painter (born 1939)

Abdullah Al Muharraqi (Arabic: عبد الله المحرقي) is a Bahraini artist. He is considered a pioneer of modern art in the Persian Gulf region.

He was born in Manama, Bahrain in 1939 and spent his childhood on its shores. His father was captain of a mail ship operating between Qatar and Saudi Arabia, and his mother was a painter. Although his parents believed that “art was not compatible with customs and traditions,” he enrolled at the Faculty of Fine Arts in Cairo after creating an impressive portrait of Anwar Sadat, earning his degree in decorative arts in 1967. In addition to painting, Muharraqi has published political cartoons in the Bahraini daily newspaper Akhbar Al Khaleej.

== Art ==
Muharraqi is a celebrated artist among collectors in the Gulf Cooperation Council, and he has an entire wing dedicated to his work at the Mathaf: Arab Museum of Modern Art in Qatar.
