= Matam Bin Rajab =

Matam Bin Rajab (Arabic: مأتم بن رجب) is the first Matam in Manama, located in the Fareeq el-Hatab district of that city.

The governor of the Capital Governorate Sheikh Humood bin Abdullah Al Khalifa visited the Matam in 2004.

During the Arab Spring it was also known for "meetings of the opposing movements from all over Bahrain."
