= List of islands in the Persian Gulf =

Islands near the Strait of Hormuz

The Persian Gulf is home to many islands, mostly small, distributed in the gulf's entire geographic area and administered by the neighboring nations. Most islands are sparsely populated, with some being barren, and some utilized for communication, military, or as ship docks. Some of the islands in the Persian Gulf are artificially constructed islands. The artificial islands often serve as tourist resorts, housing developments, or hotels. Despite their small sizes, some of these artificial islands have caused serious hazards for the already fragile ecosystem of the Gulf and its dwindling wildlife mass. A few of the Gulf islands are also historically significant, having been utilized by the ancient empires, neighboring kingdoms, and in the recent times, colonial powers such as the British Empire, and the Portuguese Empire. Recent globalization, and discovery of oil, has made some of the Persian Gulf islands very significant for developed nations as a source of oil and raw industrial material. Recent wars, and political unrest has also made these islands strategic military locations for foreign powers from America and Europe.

Some islands in the Persian Gulf are nations themselves; Bahrain, an independent Gulf state, is the only gulf country that is also an island.

== Bahrain ==
- Arad (now part of Muharraq Island)
- Ajirah Island (Hawar Islands)
- Al Dar Island
- Al Garum Islands
- Al Hajiyat (Hawar Islands)
- Al Hul Island
- Al Muturith
- Al Qulay'ah
- Al Sayah Island
- Al Shaikh Island
- Al Wukur Islands (Hawar Islands)
- Bahrain Island
- Busadad Island and Islets (Bu Tumur Islands) (Hawar Islands)
- Falkland Island (Bahrain)
- Halat Naim
- Halat Seltah (now part of Halat Naim)
- Hawar Islands
- Jarada Island
- Jidda Island
- Jinni Island (Hawar Islands)
- Mashtan Island
- Muharraq Island
- Muhazwara (Hawar Islands)
- Nabih Saleh
- Noon Island and Islet
- Qassar Diwan
- Rubud Al Gharbiyah (Western Island, Hawar Islands)
- Rubud Al Sharqiyah (Eastern Island, Hawar Islands)
- Sitra
- Smaller Baynah (Eastern Island)
- Suwad Al Janubiyah (Southern Island, Hawar Islands)
- Suwad Al Shamaliyah (Northern Island, Hawar Islands)
- Umm an Nasan
- Umm as Sabaan
- Umm Jaleed
- Ya'sub Island

== Iran ==
- Abbasak Island (Shah Zendegi)
- Bu Musa
- Cheraghi Island
- Farsi Island
- Forur Bozorg Island (Polour)
- Forur Koochak Island (Forurgan)
- Greater Tunb
- Lesser Tunb
- Hendurabi Island
- Hengam Island
- Hormuz Island
- Jonobi Island (Mir Mohna Island)
- Kharg Island (Khark)
- Kharku Island
- Kish Island
- Larak Island
- Lavan Island
- Morghi Island
- Motaff Island
- Mouliaat Island
- Naaz Islands
- Nakhiloo Island
- Negin Island
- Om e Sile Island (Khan)
- Ommolkorm Island (Gorm)
- Qabre Nakhoda Island
- Qeshm Island
- Rostam Island (Reshadat oil field platform)
- Sadra Island
- SeDandon Island
- Sheykh Andarabi Island
- Shidvar Island
- Sirri Island
- Tahmadu Island (Jabrin)

== Kuwait ==
- Auhah Island
- Bubiyan Island
- Failaka Island
- Kubbar Island
- Miskan Island
- Qaruh Island
- Umm al Maradim Island
- Umm an Namil Island
- Warbah Island
- Green Island

== Qatar ==
- Al Aaliya Island
- Al Khor Island
- Al Safliya Island
- Banana Island
- Halul Island
- Jinan Island
- Pearl Island
- Ras Rakan

== Saudi Arabia ==
- Arabia Island
- Tarout Island
- Huwaisat Island
- Mashaab Island
- Paradise Island
- Muslimyah Island
- Qumairi Island
- Jana Island
- Grid Island
- Crane Island
- Couscous island
- Al Bayna Island
- Abu Ali Island
- Darien Island

== United Arab Emirates ==
- Daiyina
- Das
- Dalma Island
- Arzanah
- Al Qaffāy
- Sir Abu Nu’ayr
- Zirku Island
- Dubai Islands
- Sir Bani Yas
- The World Islands
- Yas Island

== See also ==
- List of islands of Oman
