= List of islands of Bahrain =

This is a list of islands of the Kingdom of Bahrain, which includes most of the archipelago known as the Bahrain Islands Archipelago. The Kingdom consists of 33 natural islands and a number of man-made ones. In addition to the Island of Bahrain, the Kingdom consists of other significant natural islands:

- Muharraq Island, the 2nd most populated island in Bahrain, hosting its biggest port.
- Sitra Island, an island which hosts Bahrain's oil port.
- Nabih Saleh, an island between the island of Sitra and Manama.
- Umm an Nasan, an island that the King Fahd Causeway, which connects Bahrain and Saudi Arabia, passes through.
- The Jidda Islands which consist of three islands. This island is situated in the west side of Bahrain.
- The Hawar Islands archipelago, located between Bahrain and Qatar
- Halat Nuaim and Halat Seltah, the smallest permanently populated islands in Bahrain.

== List of Islands ==
List of Natural Islands
Island	Area (km^{2})	Population (2025)	Proportion of total population (2025)	Status	Notes
Bahrain Island	617	1,221,849	76.16%	Inhabited	Largest island of the archipelago, hosts the capital and largest city, Manama. Historically also known as Awal Island.
Muharraq Island	74.1	297,211	18.52%	Inhabited	2nd most populated island in the country, hosts Bahrain's main passenger airport.
Halat Seltah	0.45	~300	0.1%	Inhabited	Now conjoined with Halat Nuaim.
Halat Nuaim	0.5	~700	0.1%	Inhabited	Now connected to Muharraq Island via a causeway.
Nabih Saleh	1.3	~3,200	0.2%	Inhabited	Named after a 14th century holy figure, hosts the shrine of Nabih Saleh.
Sitra	21.8	~81,000	5%	Inhabited	3rd most populated island in the country, hosts oil port.
Umm an Nasan	20.61	~10	0%	Reserve/Private	King Fahd Causeway passes through the island, connecting Bahrain to the rest of mainland Asia.
Umm as Sabaan	0.2	~3	0%	Inhabited	Also goes by "Al Muhammadiyah." Used to be privately owned.
Al Sayah Island	0.1	0	0%	Reserve	Considered to be the world's oldest permanent artificial island.
Abu Amira Islets	0.02	0	0%	Uninhabited	Two small hard coral skerry-islets situated 2 kilometres west off the coast of Budaiya.
Jidda Island	0.6	0	0%	Private	Connected to Umm Al Nasan via a causeway.
Ya'sub Island	0.2	0	0%	Uninhabited	Situated 2 kilometres west off the coast of Karzakan. sometimes spelled as "Ya'suf"
Al Dar Island	0.04	0	0%	Resort	Now a Luxury resort destination.
Falkland Island	0.02	0	0%	Uninhabited	North of Al Dar island.
Al Garum Islands	0.10	0	0%	Uninhabited	Made up of 3 islands, and are the archipelago's northern most islands. Hosts a coastguard outpost.
Qassar al Qulay`ah	0.13	0	0%	Uninhabited	Situated between Bahrain's Oil port in Sitra and the Dry Dock in Muharraq.
Al Shaikh Island	0.02	0	0%	Uninhabited	Rocky island off the coast of Askar, harbours an old shrine/mosque.
Umm Jaleed Island	0.1	0	0%	Reserve/Private	The island is partially privatised annually for coastguard operations.
Mashtan Island	0.15	0	0%	Reserve	Reserve island south of Bahrain Island.
Hawar Island	52.1	~30	0.5%	Reserve/Resort	Largest Island in the Hawar Islands archipelago. Bahrain's southern most point is found on this island.
Ajirah Island (Hawar Islands)	0.05	0	0%	Uninhabited	Part of the Hawar Islands archipelago.
East Rubud (Hawar Islands)	1.3	0	0%	Reserve	Northern Most island of the Hawar Islands archipelago.
West Rubud (Hawar Islands)	0.6	0	0%	Reserve	Marshy and muddy terrain, briefly connects to West Rubud during low tides.
North Suwad (Hawar Islands)	2.70	0	0%	Reserve	Nature reserve, popular for birdwatching tourism.
South Suwad (Hawar Islands)	6.5	0	0%	Reserve	2nd Largest Island in the Hawar Islands archipelago. 25% of the rare Socotra bird population is found on this island.
Muhazwara (Hawar Islands)	0.49	0	0%	Reserve	Situated in the centre of the Hawar Islands archipelago. Contains a steep cliff.
Busadad Islands (Hawar Islands)	0.3	0	0%	Reserve	A chain of 5-7 islands (depending on the tide) that include Bu Tammur islands. Home to swaths of mangrove trees.
Al Hajiyat Islands (Hawar Islands)	0.5	0	0%	Reserve	Composed of 3 small islands.
Qassar Mohamed (Hawar Islands)	0.05	0	0%	Uninhabited	Composed of an island and islet (Qassar Hassan).
Umm Jinni (Hawar Islands)	0.2	0	0%	Reserve	Situated 1 kilometre north off the coast of Muhazwara and 2 kilometres off the western coast of North Suwad island.
Al Wukur Islands (Hawar Islands)	0.2	0	0%	Reserve	Composed of 3 small rocky islands.
Jarada Island	0.02	0	0%	Reserve/Resort	Popular tourist island, the island disappears into the water and rises back up depending on the tide. the water surrounding the island is very shallow.
Noon Island and Islet	0.02	0	0%	Uninhabited	Composed of Noon and Qassar Noon, situated 4.5 kilometres off Bahrain Island's southernmost point.
Al Mutirith	0.02	0	0%	Uninhabited	Situated between Bahrain Island and the Hawar Islands archipelago. Size changes depending on the tide.
Al Hul	0.02	0	0%	Uninhabited	Located 3 kilometres southwest of Noon Island, surrounding sand banks enlarge the island during low tides.
Smaller Baynah	0.03	0	0%	Uninhabited	Bahrain's westernmost island, made up of Greater Baynah (West) and Smaller Baynah (East) split between Bahrain and Saudi Arabia, with Bahrain claiming the eastern island. Located south of Passport Island.
Qassar Diwan	0.01	0	0%	Uninhabited	Skerry located in between the dry dock and east of Qassar Al Qulayah. Bahrain's smallest islet, often not counted as an island on official records.
Bahrain	787.0	1,604,300	100%	100%	

== Former islands ==
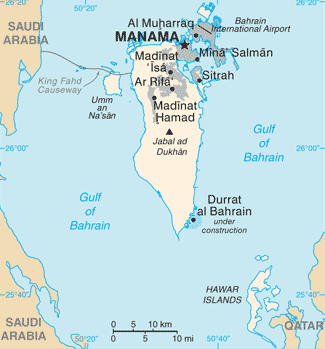
Map of Bahrain, 2014

Islands that once existed but which now, because of land reclamation, are no longer separated from larger land masses. This does not include islands that are now connected to the mainland via bridges or causeways.

- Abu Shahin Islet, now part of Muharraq Island (East Hidd)
- Al Azl Island, also known as "Umm Al Shyarah", now joined to Muharraq Island
- Arad Island, including Arad Fort, now joined to Muharraq Island
- Halat Bu Maher, now joined to Muharraq Island
- Juzairat Nabih Saleh, now connected to Nabih Saleh
- Jurdi Islet, now part of Muharraq Island (Amwaj Islands)
- Khasifah or "Khasifeh", now joined to Al Dair
- Halat Seltah, now conjoined with Halat Nuaim, which is connected to Muharraq via causeway.
- Umm Al Shajar, now part of Muharraq Island (Hidd)
- Qassar Bin-Tarif– an islet in Tubli Bay located in between Sitra and Nabih Saleh, now submerged underwater
- Qassarain or "Kasarain", 2 small skerries now part of Sitra

== See also ==
- Bahrain Island
- Geography of Bahrain
- List of islands in the Persian Gulf
- Hawar Islands
- Muharraq Island
