= Halat Nuaim =

Native name: حالة نعيم (Arabic)
- Location within Bahrain

Geography
- Location: Persian Gulf
- Coordinates: 26.24°N 50.635°E
- Archipelago: Bahrain
- Adjacent to: Persian Gulf
- Total islands: 1
- Major islands: Halat Nuaim Island
- Area: 0.27 km^{2} (0.10 sq mi)
- Length: 0.65 km (0.404 mi)
- Width: 0.75 km (0.466 mi)
- Coastline: 2.58 km (1.603 mi)
- Highest elevation: 15 m (49 ft)

Administration
- Bahrain
- Governorate: Muharraq Governorate
- Largest settlement: Nuaim (pop. 500)

Demographics
- Demonym: Bahraini
- Population: 1,000 (2014)
- Pop. density: 3,700/km^{2} (9600/sq mi)
- Ethnic groups: Bahraini, non-Bahraini

Additional information
- Time zone: AST (UTC+3)
- ISO code: BH-14
- Official website: www.bahrain.com

Halat Nuaim-Seltah (Arabic: حالة نعيم السلطة) is a Bahraini island. It is located off the coast of Muharraq island, near the town of Hidd. It lies 5 km (3.1 mi) east of the capital, Manama, on Bahrain Island.

== History ==
Until the late 1990s, instead of the present single island, there were two islands separated by a 100-meter channel between them. Halat Nuaim was inhabited by the Al Nuaim tribe, after whom it was named. Halat Seltah was inhabited by the Al Sulaiti tribe, and got its name from the tribe. In 1998, dredging began in the canal, to create an artificial land and connect the islands.

== Demography ==
There are two villages located on the Island:

- Nuaim
- Seltah

== Administration ==
The island belongs to Muharraq Governorate .

== Transportation ==
The island is today connected to Muharraq Island by a road.

== Economics ==
The inhabitants on the island are engaged in very small-scale fishing, mainly for the island consumption.

== Image gallery ==
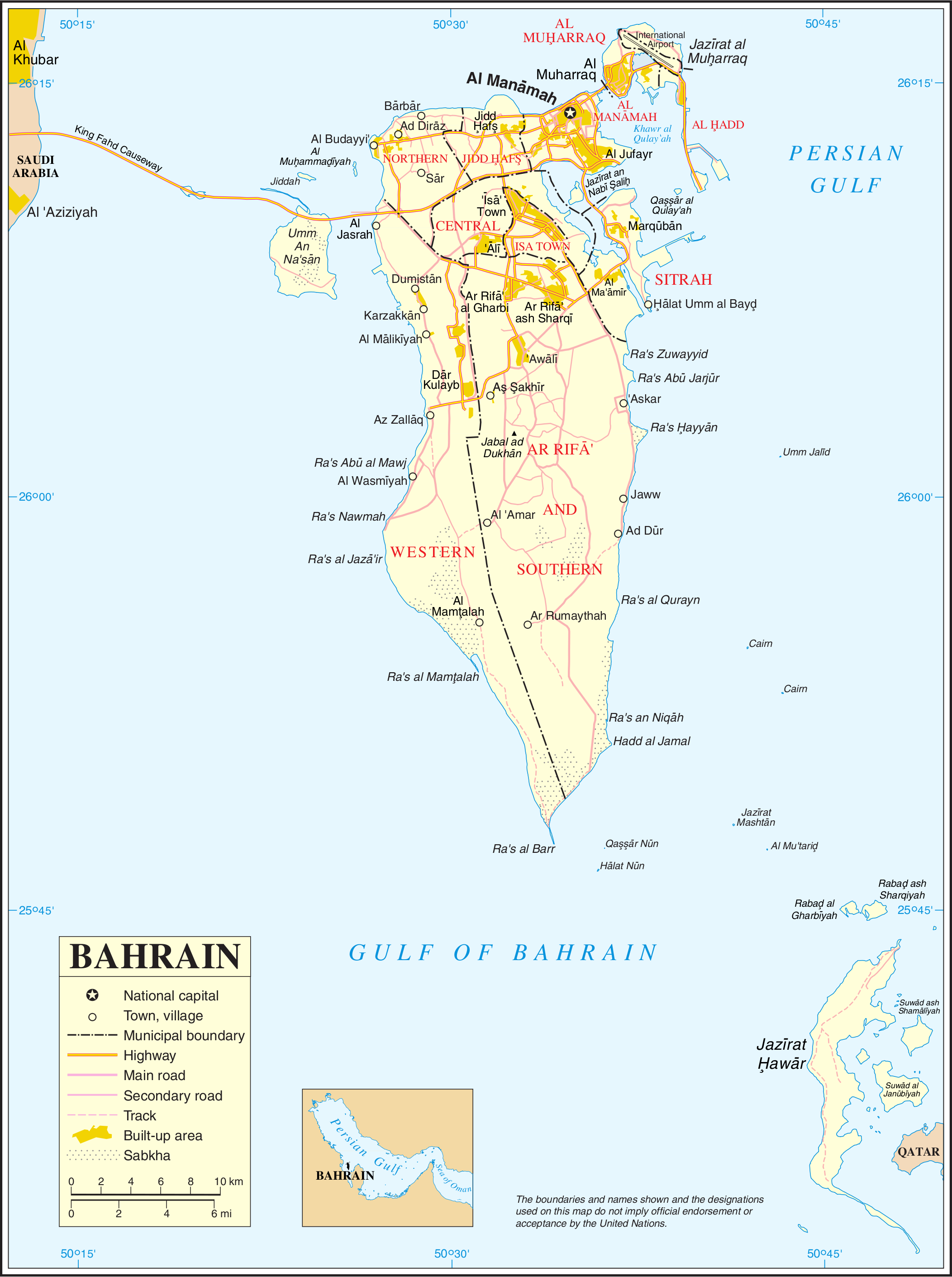
Map 1

District Map

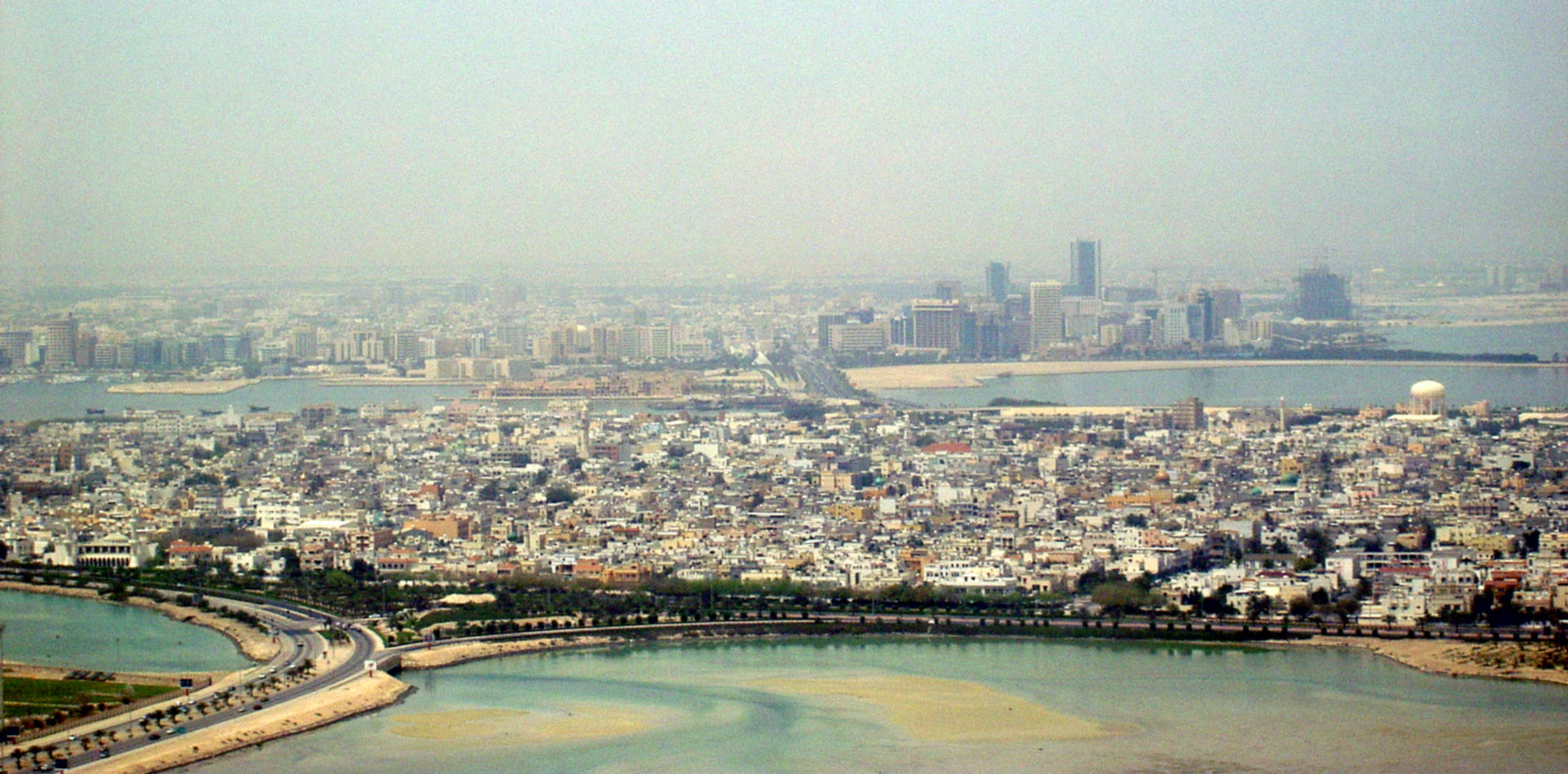
Muharraq in the foreground; Manama on Bahrain Island in the background

== See also ==
- List of islands of Bahrain
