= Hisham Al Asheeri =

Bahraini politician

- هشام العشيري

Member of the Council of Representatives for the Sixth District of Muharraq Governorate
- Incumbent
- Assumed office 2018
- Monarch: Hamad bin Isa Al Khalifa
- Prime Minister: Khalifa bin Salman Al Khalifa, Salman, Crown Prince of Bahrain
- Preceded by: Abbas Al Madi
- Parliamentary group: independent

Personal details
- Born: Hisham Ahmed Youssef Ahmed Al-Asheri
- Occupation: academic

Hisham Al Asheeri (Arabic: هشام العشيري) is a Bahraini politician, academic, and author. He was sworn in on December 12, 2018 as a member of the Council of Representatives for the sixth district of Muharraq Governorate.

== Career ==
Al Asheeri worked earlier at the Bahraini branch of the Arab Open University, first as Director of Continuing Education and Professional Development, then as Assistant Director of Academic Affairs for the entire Bahrain office.

He has written several books, most notably the following:

- المهارات الكتابية والتعلم الذاتي (“Writing Skills and Self-Learning,” 2003)
- تكنولوجيا الوسائط المتعددة التعليمية في القرن الحادي والعشرين (“Educational Multimedia Technology in the Twenty-first Century,” 2011)

== Election ==
Al Asheeri ran for the sixth district in the Muharraq Governorate in the 2018 Bahraini general election. He won in the first round on November 24 of that year, with 1,556 votes for 59.12%.
