= Qassar al Qulayʽah =

Native name: قصار القليعة
- Location within Bahrain

Geography
- Location: Persian Gulf
- Coordinates: 26.185°N 50.655°E
- Archipelago: Bahrain
- Adjacent to: Persian Gulf
- Total islands: 1
- Major islands: Qassar al Qulay`ah
- Area: 0.13 km^{2} (0.050 sq mi)
- Highest elevation: 5 m (16 ft)

Administration
- Bahrain
- Governorate: Muharraq Governorate
- Largest settlement: Bahrain port facilities (pop. 0)

Demographics
- Demonym: Bahraini
- Population: 0 (2010)
- Pop. density: 0/km^{2} (0/sq mi)
- Ethnic groups: Bahraini, non-Bahraini

Additional information
- Time zone: AST (UTC+3)
- ISO code: BH-14
- Official website: www.bahrain.com

Qassar al Qulayʽah Island is an island of Bahrain. It lies 7 km (4.3 mi) southeast of the capital Manama, which is located on Bahrain Island, by far the largest island within the archipelago of Bahrain.

== Administration ==
The Qassar al Qulayʽah island belongs to Muharraq Governorate.

== Transportation ==
The island has some of the Bahrain Port facilities.

== Image gallery ==
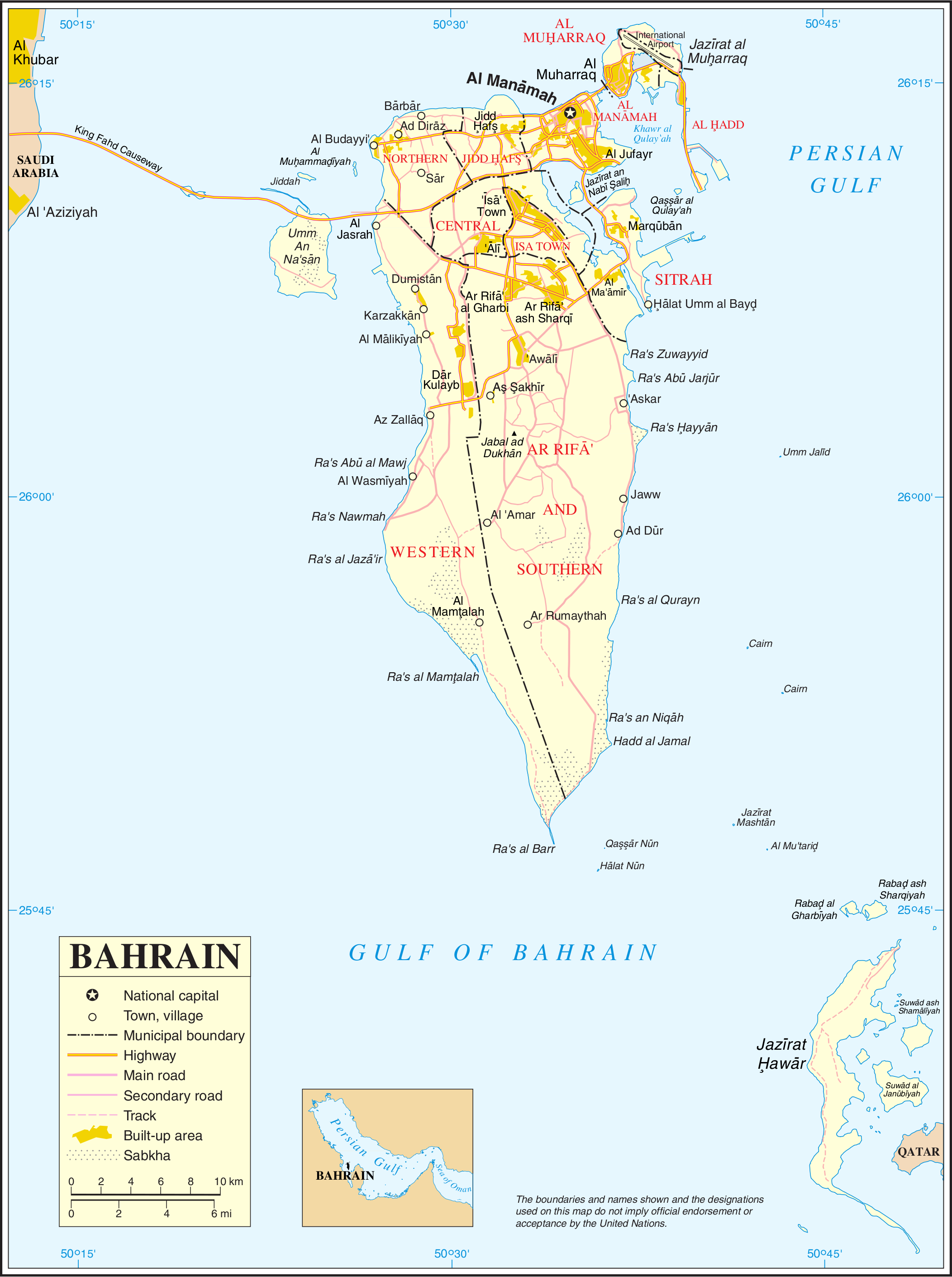
Map 1

District Map

== See also ==
- List of islands of Bahrain
