= List of ports and harbours of the Indian Ocean =

This is a list of ports and harbours of the Indian Ocean.

== List ==
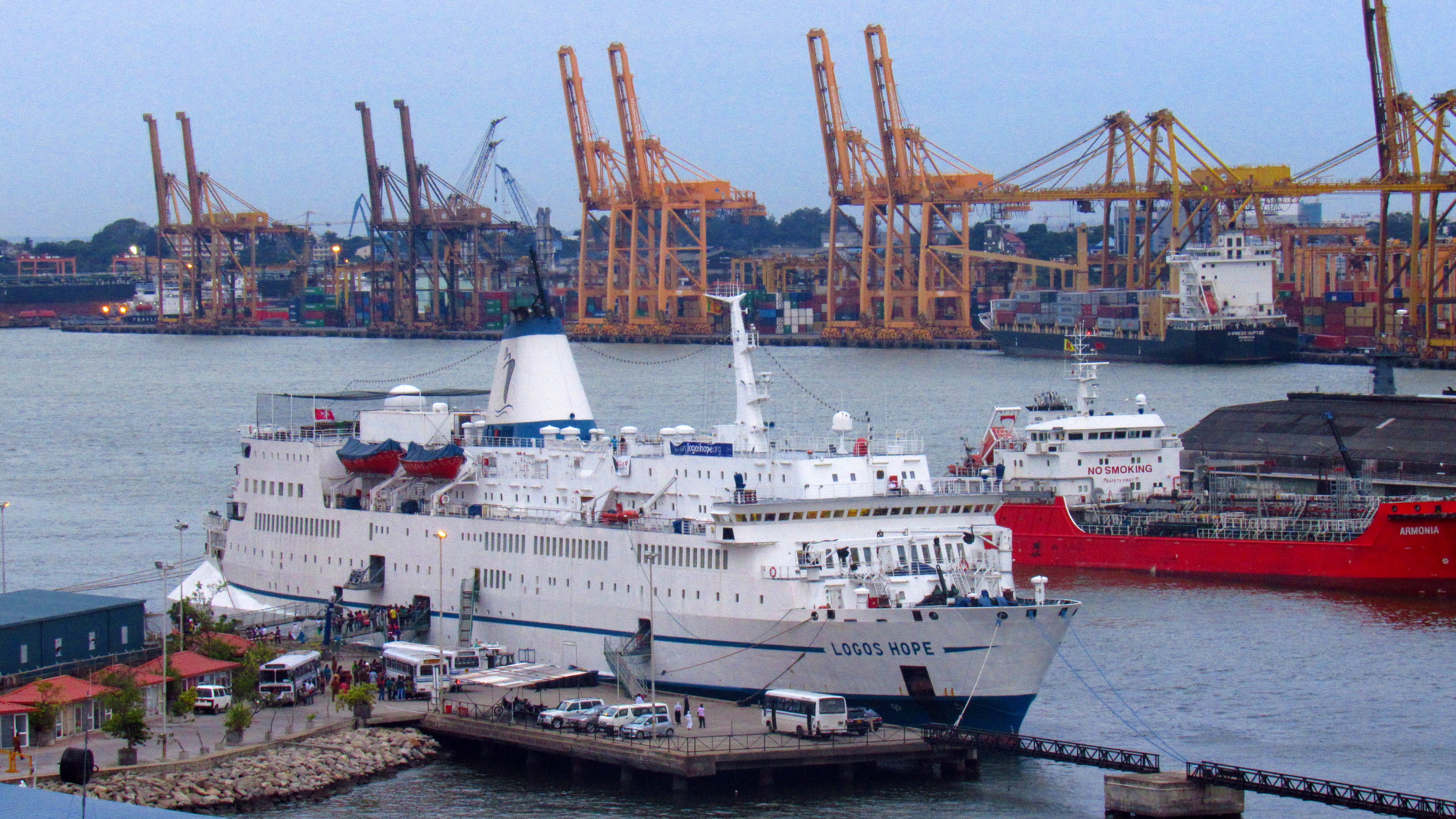
Port of Colombo in Sri Lanka

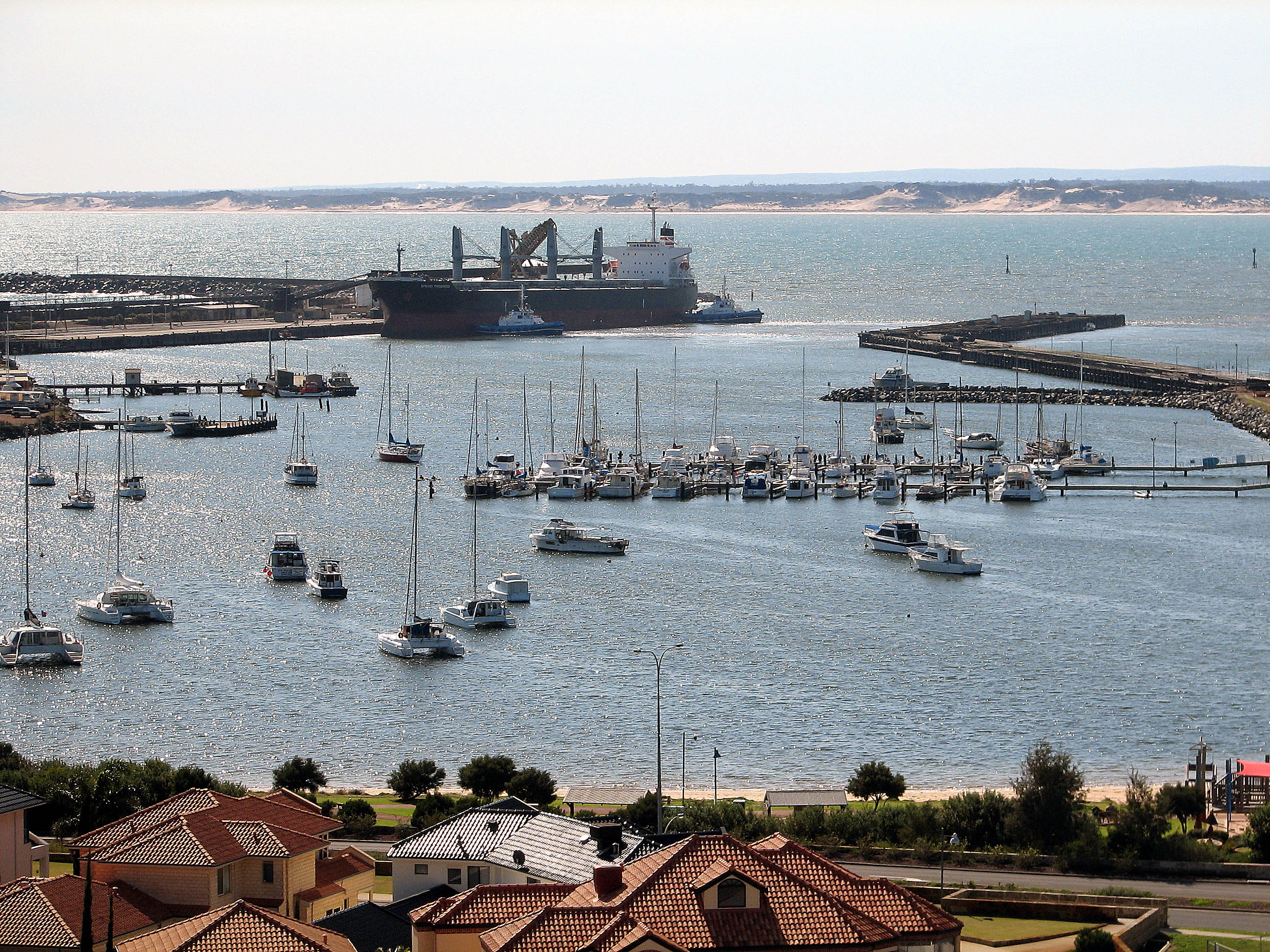
Bunbury Port

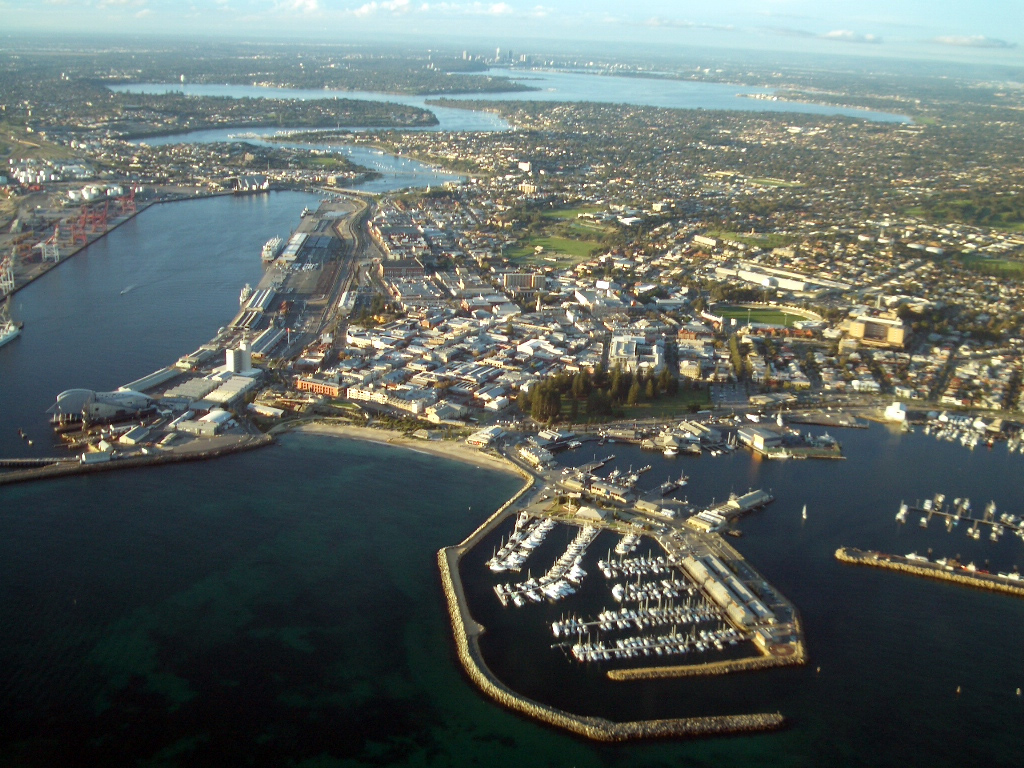
Fremantle Port

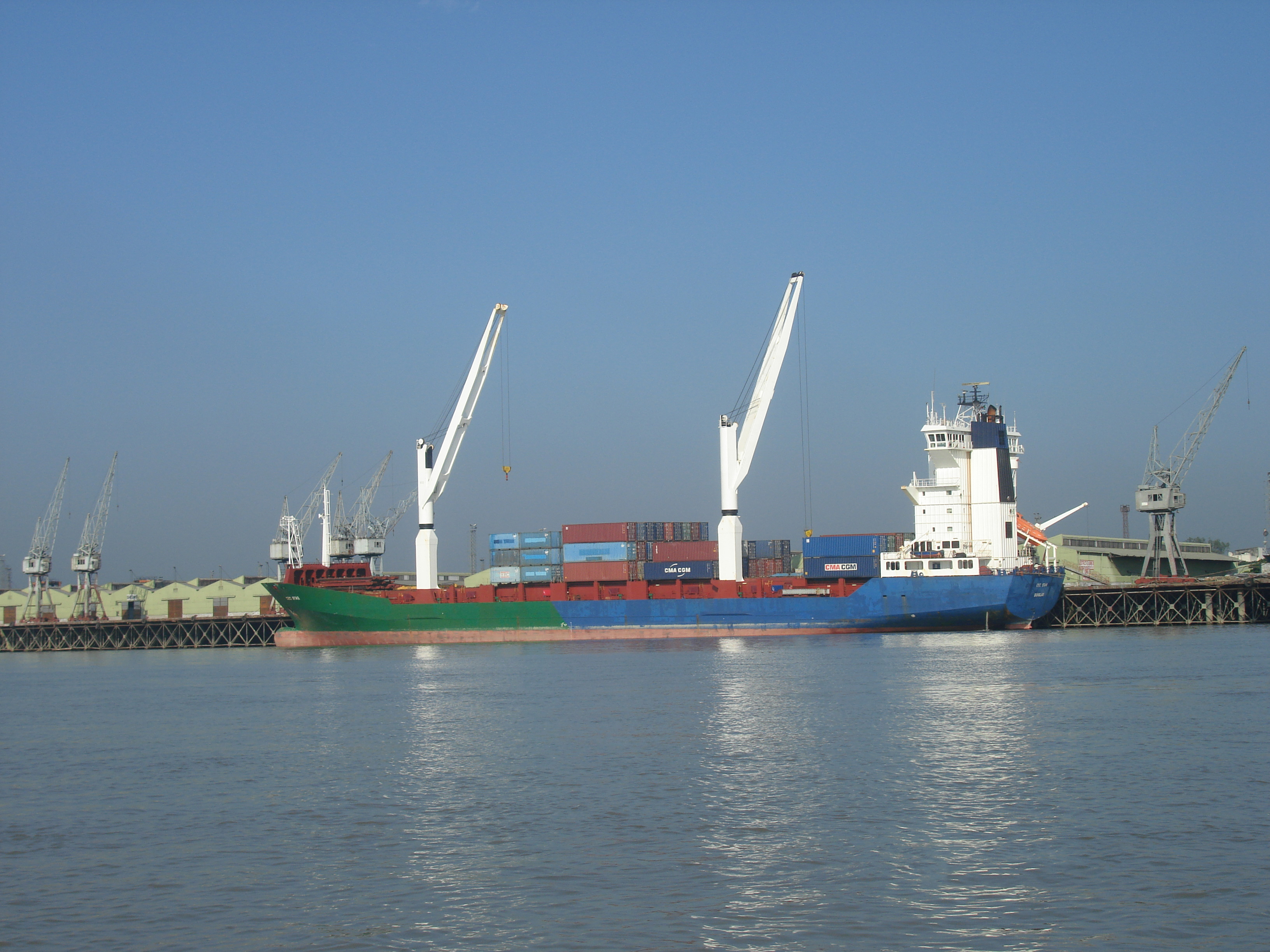
Chittagong port

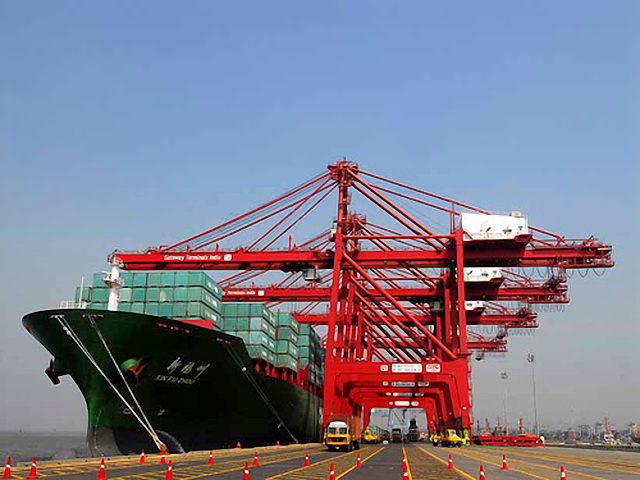
Jawaharlal Nehru Port Trust, Navi Mumbai, Maharashtra, India

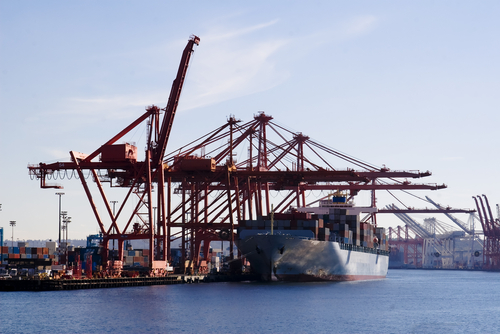
Mundra Port, Gujarat, India

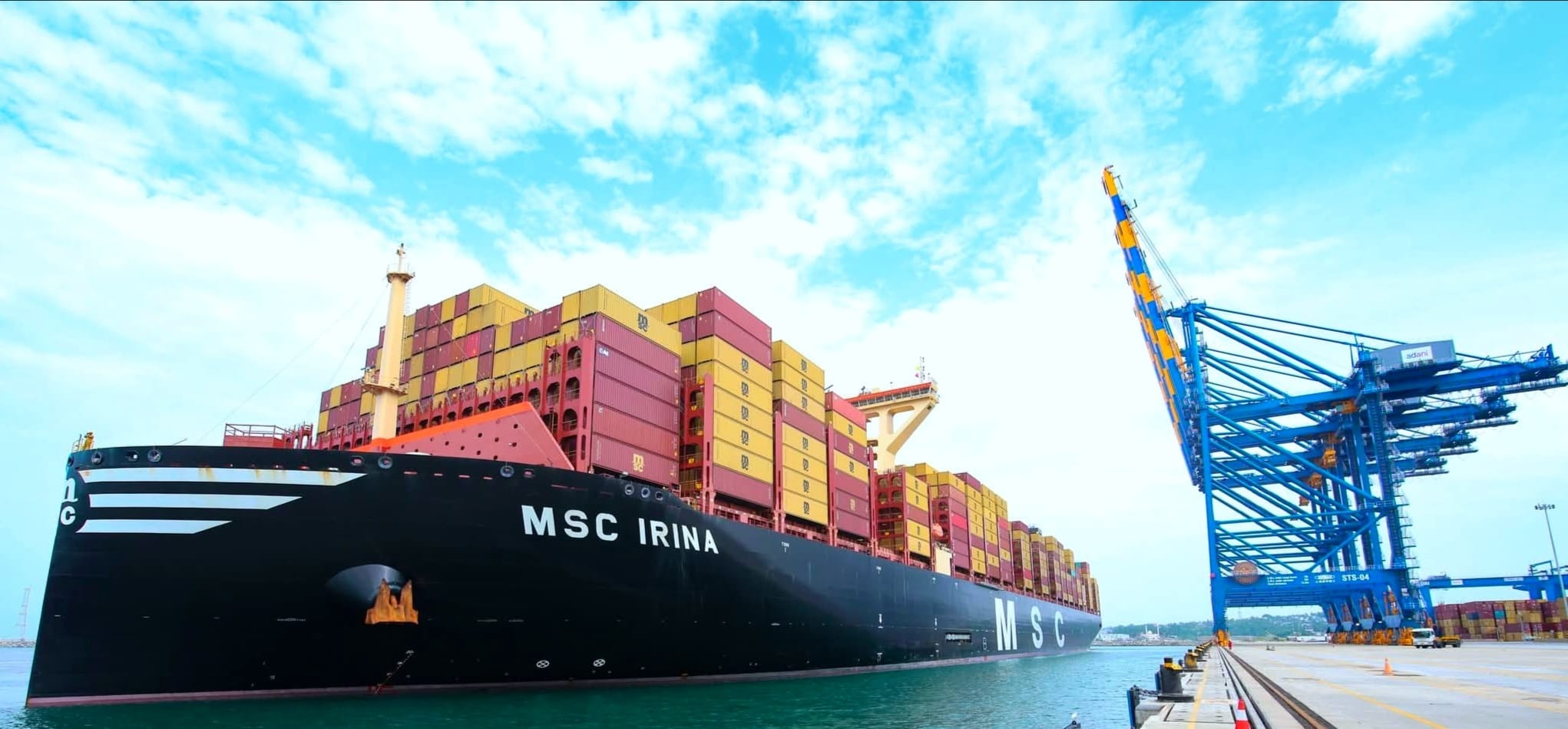
Vizhinjam_International_Seaport_Thiruvananthapuram, Kerala, India

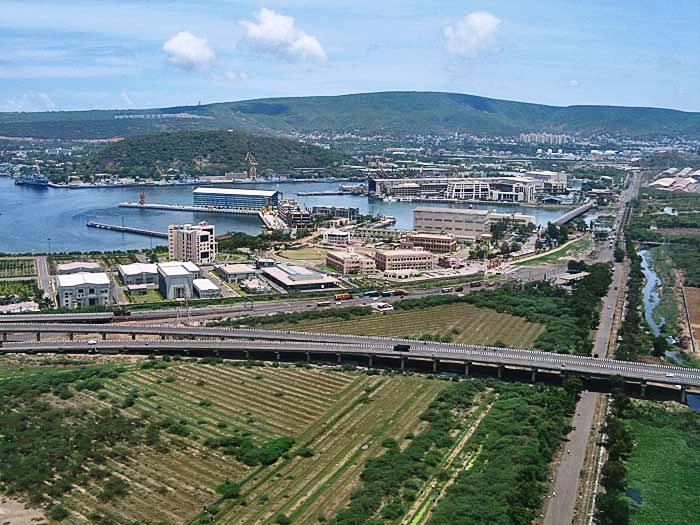
Visakhapatnam Port, Andhra Pradesh, India

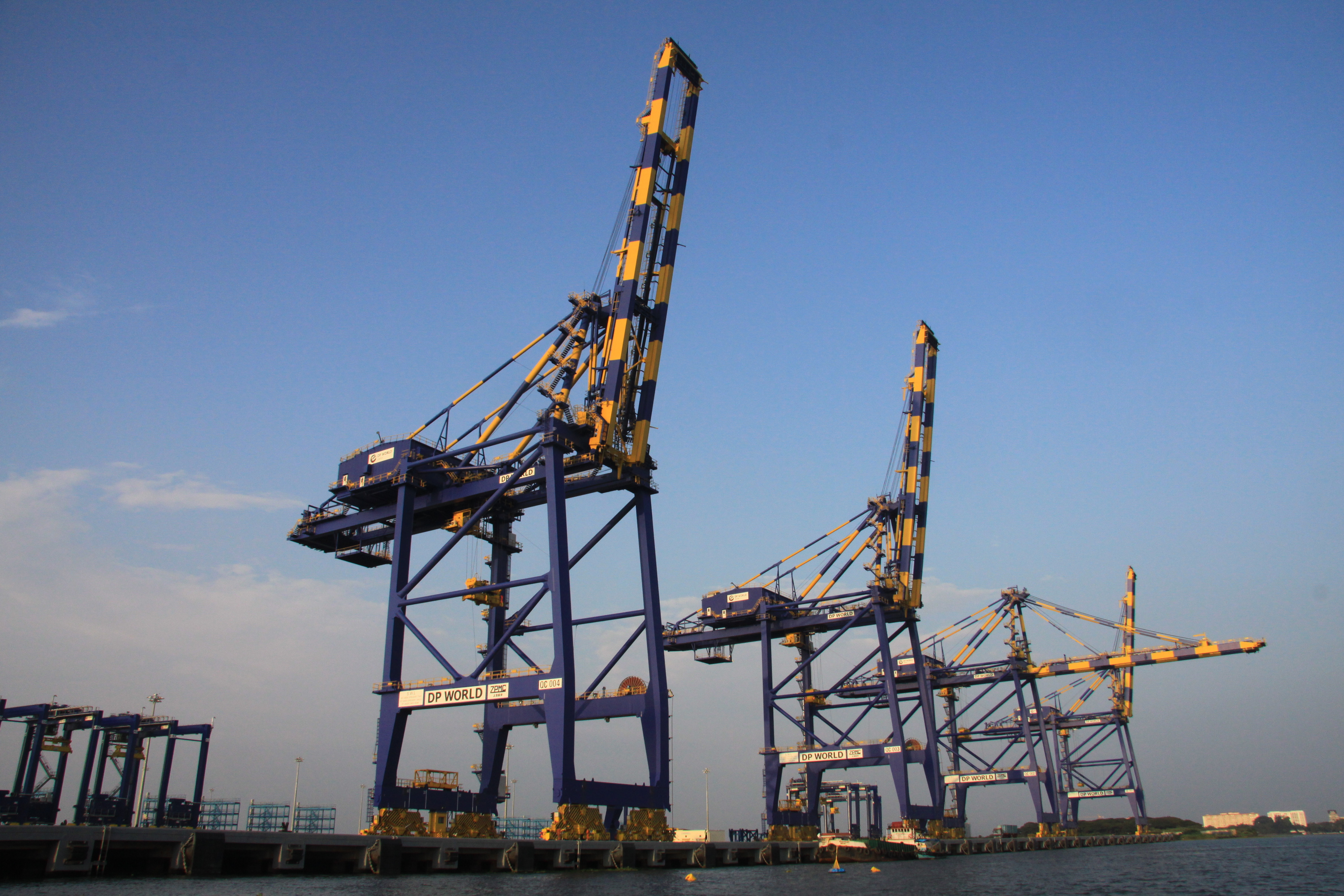
Kochi Port, Kerala, India

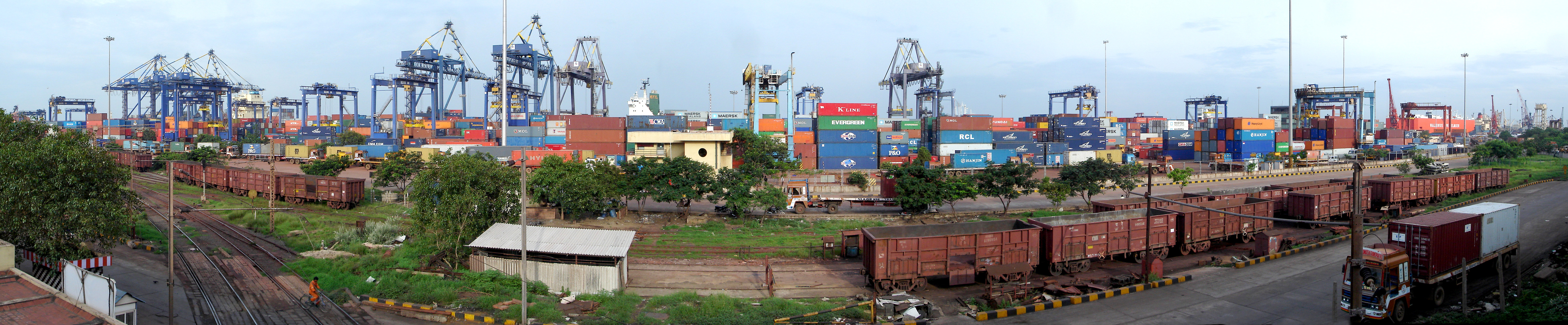
Chennai port, Tamil Nadu, India

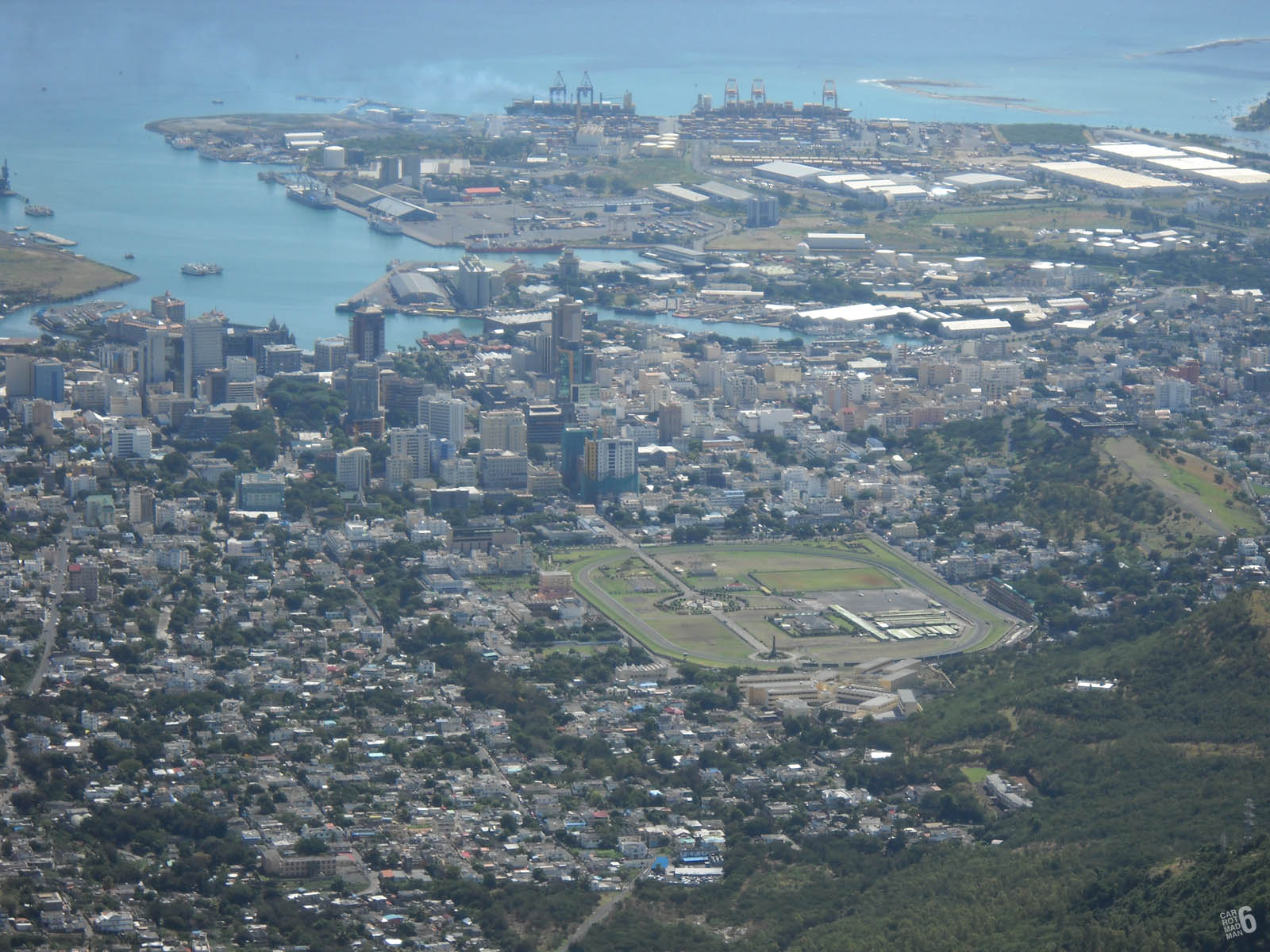
Port Louis, Mauritius

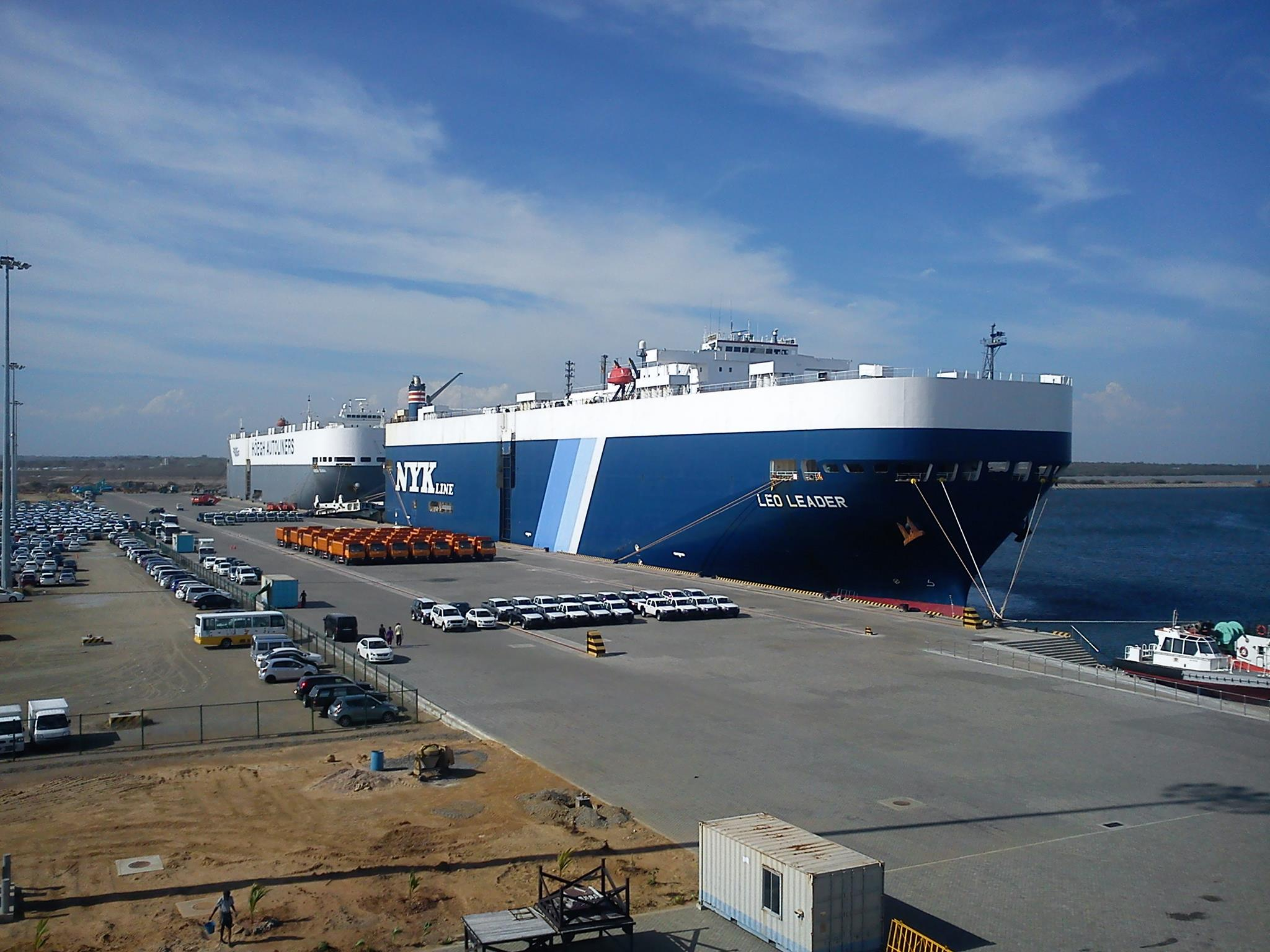
Port of Hambantota in Sri Lanka

Land region	Country, subdivision	Port	Container Port	Body of water
Oceania	Australia, Western Australia	Barrow Island		
Oceania	Australia, Western Australia	Broome		
Oceania	Australia, Western Australia	Bunbury		
Oceania	Australia, Western Australia	Busselton		
Oceania	Australia, Western Australia	Challenger Harbour		
Oceania	Australia, Western Australia	Cockatoo Island		
Oceania	Australia, Western Australia	Cossack		
Oceania	Australia, Western Australia	Dampier		
Oceania	Australia, Western Australia	Derby		
Oceania	Australia, Western Australia	Fishing Boat Harbour		
Oceania	Australia, Western Australia	Fremantle	Yes	
Oceania	Australia, Western Australia	Garkunnden Island		
Oceania	Australia, Western Australia	Geraldton		
Oceania	Australia, Western Australia	Hamelin Bay		
Oceania	Australia, Western Australia	Koolan Island		
Oceania	Australia, Western Australia	Kwinana		
Oceania	Australia, Western Australia	Port Hedland		
Oceania	Australia, Western Australia	Thompsons Bay, Western Australia		
Oceania	Australia, Western Australia	Wyndham		
Oceania	Australia, South Australia	Port Adelaide		
Oceania	Australia, South Australia	Port Lincoln		
Oceania	Australia, South Australia	Port Pirie		
Oceania	Australia, Tasmania	Strahan		
Oceania	Australia, Victoria	Portland		
Oceania	Australia, Victoria	Geelong		Port Phillip Bay
Oceania	Australia, Victoria	Port of Melbourne		Port Phillip Bay
South Asia	Bangladesh, Chittagong	Port of Chittagong	Yes	Bay of Bengal
South Asia	Bangladesh, Bagerhat	Port of Mongla	Yes	Bay of Bengal
South Asia	Bangladesh, Patuakhali	Port of Paira		Bay of Bengal
South Asia	Bangladesh, Cox's Bazar	Matarbari Port		Bay of Bengal
West Asia	Bahrain, Al Hidd	Khalifa Bin Salman Port		Persian Gulf
West Asia	Bahrain, Manama	Mina Salman Port		Persian Gulf
East Africa	Djibouti	Port of Djibouti in Djibouti City		Gulf of Aden, Gulf of Tadjoura
Northeast Africa	Egypt	Hurghada		Red Sea
Northeast Africa	Egypt	Suez		Red Sea
East Africa	Eritrea	Asseb		Red Sea
East Africa	Eritrea	Massawa		Red Sea
South Asia	India, Gujarat	Alang		
South Asia	India, Maharashtra	Angré Port		
South Asia	India, Gujarat	Bedi		
South Asia	India, Kerala	Beypore		
South Asia	India, Gujarat	Bhavnagar		
South Asia	India, Tamil Nadu	Cuddalore		Bay of Bengal
South Asia	India, Andaman and Nicobar Islands	Car Nicobar		
South Asia	India, Gujarat	Dahej		
South Asia	India, Tamil Nadu	Kamarajar Port Limited, Ennore		Bay of Bengal
South Asia	India, Maharashtra	Dabhol LNG Terminal		
South Asia	India, Andhra Pradesh, Visakhapatnam	Gangavaram Port		Bay of Bengal
South Asia	India, Andhra Pradesh, Visakhapatnam	Visakhapatnam Port		Bay of Bengal
South Asia	India, Orissa	Gopalpur-on-Sea		Bay of Bengal
South Asia	India, Gujarat	Hazira		
South Asia	India, West Bengal	Haldia		Bay of Bengal via Hooghly River
South Asia	India, Gujarat	Jakhau		
South Asia	India, Maharashtra, Navi Mumbai	Jawaharlal Nehru Port Trust		Arabian Sea
South Asia	India, Andhra Pradesh	Kakinada		
South Asia	India, Gujarat	Kandla		Arabian Sea
South Asia	India, Tamil Nadu	Kattupalli Shipyard		
South Asia	India, Kerala	Cochin Port (includes International Container Transshipment Terminal, Kochi)		Arabian Sea
South Asia	India, West Bengal	Kolkata		Bay of Bengal via Hooghly River
South Asia	India, Kerala	Kollam		Arabian Sea
South Asia	India, Kerala	Vizhinjam_International_Seaport_Thiruvananthapuram	Yes	Arabian Sea
South Asia	India, Kerala	Kozhikode		
South Asia	India, Andhra Pradesh	Krishnapatnam Port		Bay of Bengal
South Asia	India, Gujarat	Magdalla		
South Asia	India, Tamil Nadu	Chennai Port Trust, Chennai		Bay of Bengal
South Asia	India, Karnataka	Mangalore (NMPT)		
South Asia	India, Goa	Mormugao		Arabian Sea
South Asia	India, Maharashtra	Port of Mumbai		
South Asia	India, Gujarat	Mundra		Arabian Sea
South Asia	India, Andhra Pradesh	Narsapur		
South Asia	India, Gujarat	Navlakhi		
South Asia	India, Gujarat	Okha		
South Asia	India, Goa	Panaji		
South Asia	India, Odisha	Paradip		Bay of Bengal
South Asia	India, Gujarat	Pipavav		
South Asia	India, Puducherry	Pondicherry		
South Asia	India, Gujarat	Porbandar		
South Asia	India, Andaman and Nicobar Islands	Port Blair		
South Asia	India, Maharashtra	Ratnagiri		
South Asia	India, Gujarat	Sikka		
South Asia	India, Gujarat	Tuna Port		
South Asia	India, Tamil Nadu	V. O. Chidambaranar Port Trust, Thoothukudi		Bay of Bengal
South Asia	India, Gujarat	Veraval		
South Asia	India, West Bengal	Haldia		
South Asia	India, Karnataka	INS Kadamba		Arabian Sea
South Asia	India, Lakshadweep	INS Dweeprakshak		Arabian Sea
South Asia	India, Kerala	INS Dronacharya		Arabian Sea
South Asia	India, Maharashtra	INS Vajrabahu		Arabian Sea
South Asia	India, Kerala	INS Venduruthy		Arabian Sea
South Asia	India, Puducherry	Karaikal		Bay of Bengal
South Asia	India, Andhra Pradesh	Machilipatnam		Bay of Bengal
South Asia	India, Tamil Nadu	Nagapattinam		Bay of Bengal
South Asia	India, Odisha	Dhamra		Bay of Bengal
Southeast Asia	Indonesia, North Sumatra	Belawan		Strait of Malacca
Southeast Asia	Indonesia, Bali	Benoa		
Southeast Asia	Indonesia, Riau	Dumai		Strait of Malacca
Southeast Asia	Indonesia, Central Java	Tanjung Emas		Java Sea
Southeast Asia	Indonesia, Central Java	Tanjung Intan (Cilacap)		
Southeast Asia	Indonesia, Jakarta	Port of Tanjung Priok		Java Sea
Southeast Asia	Indonesia, East Java	Port of Tanjung Perak		Madura Strait
West Asia	Iran, Bushehr Province	Bushehr		Arabian Sea
West Asia	Iran	Port of Chabahar		Sea of Oman
West Asia	Iran	Bandar Abbas		Persian Gulf
West Asia	Iran	Bandar Imam Khomeini		Persian Gulf
West Asia	Iraq	Umm Qasr		Persian Gulf
West Asia	Israel	Port of Eilat		Red Sea
East Africa	Kenya	Mombasa		
East Africa	Kenya	Watamu		
West Asia	Kuwait	Shuwaikh port		Persian Gulf
East Africa / Isular	Madagascar	Antsiranana (Diego Suarez)		
East Africa / Isular	Madagascar	Mahajanga		
East Africa / Isular	Madagascar	Morondava		
East Africa / Isular	Madagascar	Toamasina (Tamatave)		
East Africa / Isular	Madagascar	Tolagnaro (Fort Dauphin)		
East Africa / Isular	Madagascar	Toliara (Tulear)		
Southeast Asia	Malaysia, Johor	Johor Port in Pasir Gudang		Strait of Malacca
Southeast Asia	Malaysia, Johor	Tanjung Langsat Port		Strait of Malacca
Southeast Asia	Malaysia, Johor	Port of Tanjung Pelepas		Strait of Malacca
Southeast Asia	Malaysia, Selangor, Klang District	Port Klang (includes Westport and Northport; owned by Port Klang Authority)		Strait of Malacca
Southeast Asia	Malaysia, Selangor, Klang District	Southpoint (owned by Port Klang Authority)		Strait of Malacca
Southeast Asia	Malaysia, Penang	Port of Penang (includes Swettenham Pier, North Butterworth Container Terminal, Butterworth Deep Water Wharves and Prai Bulk Cargo Terminal)		Strait of Malacca
South Asia / Isular	Maldives	Male		
East Africa / Isular	Mauritius	Port Louis		
East Africa / Isular	Mauritius, Rodrigues	Port Mathurin		
East Africa	Mozambique	Maputo		
East Africa	Mozambique	Inhambane		
East Africa	Mozambique	Beira		
East Africa	Mozambique	Quelimane		
East Africa	Mozambique	Angoche		
East Africa	Mozambique	Nacala		
East Africa	Mozambique	Pemba		
Southeast Asia	Myanmar	Kyaukphyu		
Southeast Asia	Myanmar	Yangon		Gulf of Martaban
Southeast Asia	Myanmar	Mawlamyaing		
Southeast Asia	Myanmar	Sittwe		
West Asia	Oman, Al Wusta Region	Al Duqm Port & Drydock		Arabian Sea
West Asia	Oman, Dhofar Governorate	Port of Salalah		Arabian Sea
West Asia	Oman, Dhofar Governorate	Port of Sohar		Sea of Oman
West Asia	Oman, Musandam Governorate	Khasab		Strait of Hormuz
West Asia	Oman, Muscat Governorate, Muttrah	Port Sultan Qaboos		Sea of Oman
West Asia	Oman, Muscat Governorate	Muscat		Sea of Oman
West Asia	Pakistan, Baluchistan	Gaddani		Arabian Sea
West Asia	Pakistan, Baluchistan	Gwadar Port		Arabian Sea
West Asia	Pakistan, Sindh	Port of Karachi		Arabian Sea
West Asia	Pakistan, Sindh	Keti Bandar		Arabian Sea
West Asia	Pakistan, Balochistan	Port of Pasni		Arabian Sea
West Asia	Pakistan, Sindh	Port Qasim		Arabian Sea
West Asia	Qatar	Doha		Persian Gulf
West Asia	Saudi Arabia	Dammam		Persian Gulf
West Asia	Saudi Arabia	Khafji		Persian Gulf
West Asia	Saudi Arabia	Khobar		Persian Gulf
West Asia	Saudi Arabia	Jubail		Persian Gulf
West Asia	Saudi Arabia	Ras Tanura		Persian Gulf
West Asia	Saudi Arabia	Farasan (city)		Red Sea
West Asia	Saudi Arabia	Jeddah		Red Sea
West Asia	Saudi Arabia	Jizan		Red Sea
West Asia	Saudi Arabia	Rabigh		Red Sea
West Asia	Saudi Arabia	Yanbu		Red Sea
East Africa / Isular	Seychelles	Port Victoria		
Southeast Asia	Singapore	Port of Singapore		Strait of Malacca
East Africa	Somalia	Barawa		
East Africa	Somalia	Bosaso		Gulf of Aden
East Africa	Somalia	El-Ma'an		
East Africa	Somalia	Eyl		
East Africa	Somalia	Hobyo		
East Africa	Somalia	Kismaayo		
East Africa	Somalia	Hobyo		
East Africa	Somalia	Mareeg		
East Africa	Somalia	Merca		
East Africa	Somalia	Mogadishu		
East Africa	Somalia	Qandala		Gulf of Aden
East Africa	Somalia	Ras Kamboni		
East Africa	Somaliland	Berbera		Gulf of Aden
East Africa	Somaliland	Las Khorey		Gulf of Aden
East Africa	Somaliland	Zeila		Gulf of Aden
Southern Africa	South Africa, KwaZulu-Natal	Durban		
Southern Africa	South Africa, KwaZulu-Natal	Richards Bay		
Southern Africa	South Africa, Eastern Cape	Port Elizabeth		
Southern Africa	South Africa, Western Cape	Saldanha		Saldahna Bay
Southern Africa	South Africa, Eastern Cape	Port of Ngqura		Algoa Bay
Southern Africa	South Africa, Western Cape	Mossel Bay		
Southern Africa	South Africa, Eastern Cape	East London		
South Asia	Sri Lanka	Colombo		
South Asia	Sri Lanka	Galle		
South Asia	Sri Lanka	Hambantota		
South Asia	Sri Lanka	Trincomalee		
Northeast Africa	Sudan	Port Sudan		Red Sea
East Africa	Tanzania	Port of Dar es Salaam		
East Africa	Tanzania	Mtwara		
East Africa	Tanzania	Tanga		
East Africa	Tanzania	Zanzibar		
West Asia	Tihamah, Saudi Arabia	Al Qunfotha		Red Sea
West Asia	United Arab Emirates, Emirate of Sharjah	Khawr Fakkan		Sea of Oman
West Asia	United Arab Emirates, Emirate of Dubai	Dubai		Persian Gulf
West Asia	United Arab Emirates, Emirate of Sharjah	Hamriyah Port		Persian Gulf
West Asia	United Arab Emirates, Emirate of Dubai	Jebel Ali		Persian Gulf
West Asia	Yemen	Aden		Gulf of Aden
West Asia	Yemen	Mukalla		Gulf of Aden
West Asia	Yemen	Hodeidah		Red Sea
