= Samaheej =

Human settlement in Bahrain

Samaheej سَماهِيج
- Location within Bahrain
- Coordinates: 26.28298°N 50.63348°E
- Country: Bahrain
- Island: Muharraq Island

Samaheej (Arabic: سماهيج Samāhīj, Classical Syriac: ܡܫܡܗܝܓ Mashmahig, Persian: سه ماهی Se Mahi) is a village in Bahrain on the northern coast of Muharraq Island. Al Dair village lies to its northwest, while Galali lies to its southeast. It is north of Bahrain International Airport.

Samaheej was home to a historical Christian community, the remains of which have been uncovered through archaeological excavations at the site. Before the discovery of oil in Bahrain, most of the inhabitants were involved in farming, especially date palms, and fishing.

Among the famous people from Samaheej is Abdullah bin Saleh al Samahiji (1675 - 1722), a medieval Islamic scholar, prominent within the Akhbari school of Shiism during the Safavid era.

== Etymology ==
In Syriac, it is referred to as Meshmahig (Classical Syriac: ܡܫܡܗܝܓ Mashmahig), and the name Samaheej is said to be from Persian se (three) and mahi (fish) and hence, ‘the three fish’. Interestingly, Bahrain's old population is said to have had a Persian clergy (Zoroastrians) who used Syriac as a language of liturgy and writing more generally, in addition to a Nestorian Christian church that was uncovered in Samaheej.

== Education ==
Samajih Primary Intermediate Boys School is the sole government school within Samaheej. It is managed by the Ministry of Education, which operates government schools in Bahrain.

== Archaeology ==
Samaheej had a Nestorian Christian presence during its early history, with old foundations of a Nestorian monastery being discovered in the village. In 2024, it was published that archaeologists from the University of Exeter and the Bahrain Authority for Culture and Antiquities discovered a well-constructed building likely serving as the bishop's palace, containing domestic rooms, a kitchen, and early Christian symbols, including three plaster crosses and Chi Rho graffiti.

== Landmarks ==
The mosque of the pearl merchant Salman bin Hussain bin Matar still stands among the houses of the village, while his nearby palace beside the Riya farm, between Samaheej and Al Dair, has disappeared.
