= Shaikh Isa Causeway =

Bridge in Bahrain

Shaikh Isa Causeway جسر شيخ عيسى بن سلمان
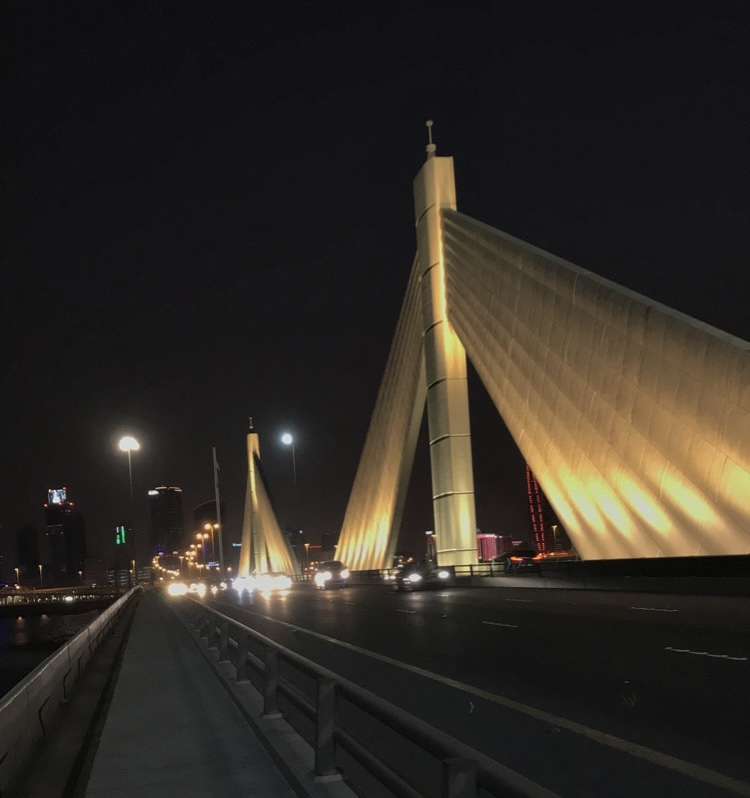
- The famous triangular white columns on the bridge, meant to symbolise sails
- Coordinates: 26°15′13″N 50°35′36″E
- Crosses: Gulf of Bahrain
- Official name: Shaikh Isa bin Salman Causeway
- Other name: Muharraq Causeway

Characteristics
- Total length: 2.5 km (1.6 mi)
- Width: 32 m (105 ft)

History
- Opened: January 7, 1997

Location
- Interactive map of Shaikh Isa Causeway

The Shaikh Isa Causeway (officially known as Shaikh Isa bin Salman Causeway, Arabic: جسر شيخ عيسى بن سلمان) is a causeway in the Kingdom of Bahrain connecting the town of Busaiteen on Muharraq Island to the Diplomatic Area of Manama, on the mainland Bahrain Island. The causeway is named after the late emir of Bahrain, Shaikh Isa bin Salman al-Khalifa, who ruled Bahrain from 1961 to 1999.

== History ==
Opened to the public in January 1997, it is the second bridge connecting the two islands, having been to relieve the traffic congestion of the previous Shaikh Hamad bridge. Construction of the 260m cable stay bridge and dredging works was carried out by Greek construction company Archirodon. Bahrain Asphalt constructed the three lane highway spanning a distance of 2.5km.

A 2018 paper by Bahrain University students described the bridge's triangular sails design being a cause of wind turbulence by creating a nozzle effect between the sails. This causes the development of strong crosswinds whilst drivers cross the bridge, causing a sensation of losing control over their vehicle. It was suggested that this could be linked to road traffic accidents on the bridge although no formal link has been established.

In December 2025, construction of a flyover connecting the causeway to Avenue 105 in Busaiteen was opened, creating a bypass towards the newly-completed Muharraq ring road and the Diyar Al Muharraq development.

== Commemoration ==
A commemorative stamp was issued by the Bahrain Post Office in 1997 to commemorate the opening of the bridge. The Central Bank of Bahrain issued a commemorative 31.1g gold medal upon the bridge's opening.

The bridge is illustrated in the reverse of the 10 Bahraini dinars (BD) banknote.

== See also ==
- Transport in Bahrain
- King Fahd Causeway
