= Arad Fort =

Coordinates: 26°15′09″N 50°37′37″E

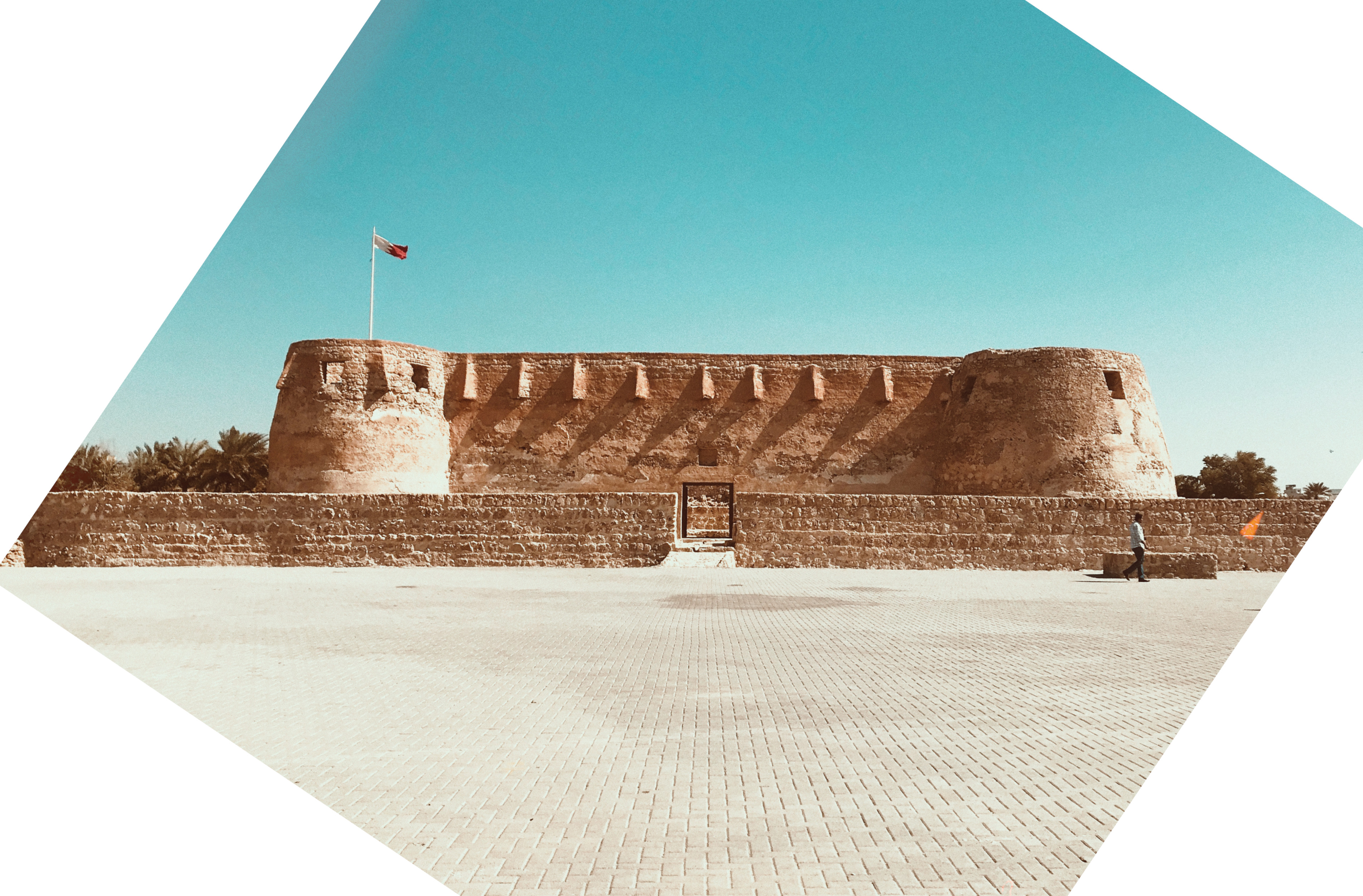
- Interactive map of Arad Fort
- Built: 15th century

Arad Fort (Arabic: قلعة عراد, Qal'at 'Arad) is a 15th-century fort in Arad, Bahrain. Formerly guarding a separate island of its own, the fort and its surroundings have since been joined to Muharraq Island through land reclamation.

Arad Fort was built in the typical style of Islamic forts during the 15th century before the Portuguese invasion of Bahrain in AD 1622. This fort has a beautiful history. A few feuds between the Islamic divisions of Bahrain have taken place here. This fort is one of the compact defensive forts in Bahrain. In its present location, it overlooks various sea passages of Muharraq's shallow seashores. In the past, there was an inaccessible marine channel which was controlled by the local people to prevent ships from breaking through to the island where the fort is located. The fort is square and on every corner there is a cylindrical tower. It is surrounded by a small trench which used to be filled with water from wells that were drilled especially for this purpose. In every corner of the upper wall of the fort there are nose shaped openings for marksmen.

Close to the Bahrain International Airport, the fort has been extensively restored and is illuminated at night. Traditional materials have been used in the restoration and maintenance of the fort after making extensive analysis of the original materials such as sea stones, lime, sand, and palm trunks. No cement or any other materials which are not in harmony with the historical building or which reduce its historical value have not been used.

== History ==
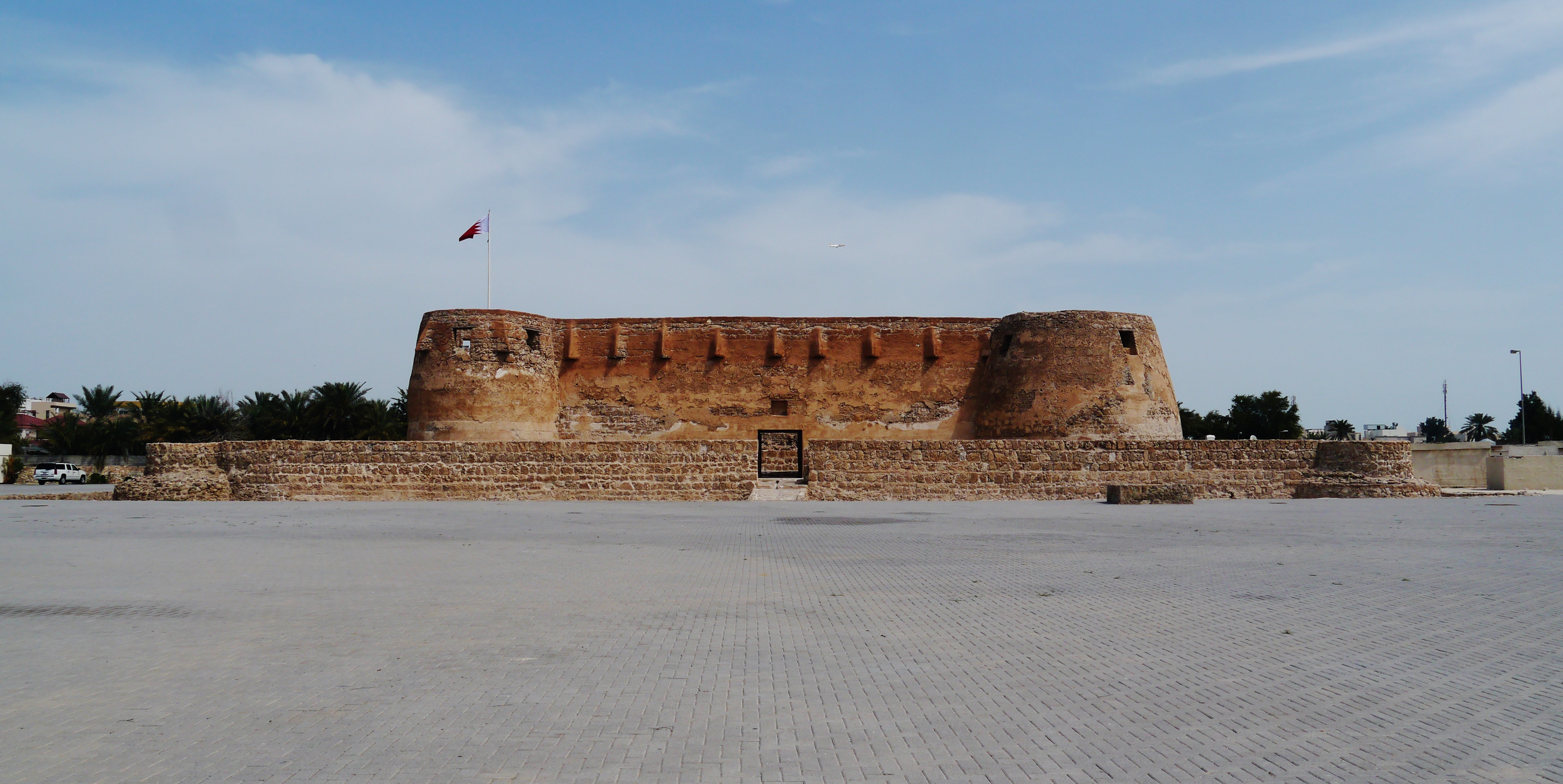
Arad Fort in 2020

Arad Fort is one of Bahrain's most important fortified castles. The Fort was built in the style of Islamic forts at the end of the 15th and early 16th centuries. It is recorded in the Portuguese map, Demonstracao da Ilha de Baren, circa 1635, the significant details being, that the fort is under siege by the Portuguese, and that it had outer and inner fortified walls. Due to its strategic location overlooking various sea passages of Muharraq Island, Arad Fort was used as a defensive fortress throughout history, from the time Bahrain was occupied by the Portuguese in the 16th century to the reign of Shaikh Salman Bin Ahmed Al-Khalifa in the 19th century. Arad Fort was most recently restored between 1984 and 1987, under the direction of the Historic Buildings and Conservation Architect, Dr Archie Walls. In order to maintain the historical authenticity and value of Arad Fort, exclusively traditional materials were used, such as coral stone, lime and tree trunks.

It is believed that the fort was built and used by the Omanis during their brief occupation of Bahrain in 1800, and it is located adjacent to the strategic waterways between Bahrain Island and Muharraq Island The canon found on top of the Fort's South Bastion pointed directly down the narrow entrance channel, formed by reefs on either side of it, that leads into Muharram Bay.

Little is known of the fort's history, and there is no firm evidence of the precise date of construction, but comprehensive excavations have been undertaken in order to discover its past. The Fort's construction follows the 'layered technique' identified by Dr Walls in the mid-1970s, a technique whose origins are in mud brick constructions.

The fort is open for a fee.

== Architecture ==
Arad Fort was built in the typical style of Islamic forts during the 15th century before the Portuguese invasion of Bahrain.

== See also ==
- Bahrain Fort
- Riffa Fort
- Culture of Bahrain
