= List of islands of Oman =

This is a list of islands of Oman, a country in Middle East.

== Al Batinah South Governorate ==
- Jazirat Al Aleem
- Jazirat Al Qat'a
- Jazirat Jabal
- Jazirat Jabal Al Awd
- Jazirat Jizayr
- Jazirat Jun
- Jazirat Maqbarah

== Ash Sharqiyah South Governorate ==
- Jazirat Al Har
- Jazirat Mawal
- Jazirat Marsays
- Jazirat Um As Sifah
- Masirah Island

== Al Wusta ==
- Jazirat Ab
- Jazirat Muhut

== Dhofar Governorate ==
- Khuriya Muriya Islands
  - Jazirat Al Hallaniyyah
  - Jazirat Al Hasikiyyah
  - Jazirat As Sawdah
  - Jazirat Al Qibliyyah
  - Jazirat Shinays
  - Qarzawit

== Musandam Governorate ==
- As Salamah Archipelago (Quoin Islands)
  - As Salamah (Jazirat Salamah) (or Quoin Island)
  - Didamar (Jazirat Tadmur) (or Little Quoin Island)
  - Fanaku (Jazirat Finaku) (or Gap Island)
- Bu Rashid (Jazirat Abu Rashid)
- Jazirat Abu Sir
- Jazirat Abu Sufur
- Jazirat Al Khil
- Jazirat Ar Ras
- Jazirat Lima
- Jazirat Mikhaylif
- Jazirat Musandam
- Jazirat Sham
- Jazirat Umm Al Ghanam
- Seebi Island (Jazirat Sibi)
- Telegraph Island
- Umm Al Fayyarin

== Muscat Governorate ==
- Ad Dimaniyat Islands
  - Al Ghurfah
  - Al Lumiyyah
  - Hayut
  - Jabal Al Kabir
  - Qasmah
- Al Fahal
- Jazirat Ras Abu Dawood

== Map ==
Locations of Islands of Oman

== See also ==
- List of islands in the Persian Gulf
