= Umm an Nasan =

Island towards the end of the King Fahd Causeway towards Bahrain

Native name: جزيرة ام النعسان (Arabic)
- Location within Bahrain

Geography
- Location: Persian Gulf
- Coordinates: 26.145°N 50.40°E
- Archipelago: Bahrain
- Adjacent to: Gulf of Bahrain
- Total islands: 1
- Major islands: Umm an Nasan Island
- Area: 20 km^{2} (7.7 sq mi)
- Length: 6 km (3.7 mi)
- Width: 4 km (2.5 mi)
- Coastline: 19 km (11.8 mi)
- Highest elevation: 3 m (10 ft)

Administration
- Bahrain
- Governorate: Northern Governorate
- Largest settlement: Umm an Nasan (pop. 10)

Demographics
- Demonym: Bahraini
- Population: 10 (2010)
- Pop. density: 0.5/km^{2} (1.3/sq mi)
- Ethnic groups: Bahraini, non-Bahraini

Additional information
- Time zone: AST (UTC+3)
- ISO code: BH-14
- Official website: www.bahrain.com

Umm an Nasan (Arabic: ام النعسان) is the fifth largest island of Bahrain. It is 17.5 km (10.9 mi) west of the capital, Manama, on Bahrain Island.

== Description ==
Umm an Nasan is privately owned by (former) Prime Minister Khalifa bin Salman Al Khalifa, and is off limits to ordinary citizens. There is little development on the island other than three palaces for the King and some gardens. There is also a small black buck population introduced to the island. The small Umm an Nasan village is located on the west coast, and has some nomadic families who care for the deer and gazelles of the island.

== Geography ==
Umm an Nasan lies in the Gulf of Bahrain in Persian Gulf to the west of Bahrain Island, and to the east of the Saudi coastal city of Khobar.

== Administration ==
The island belongs to Northern Governorate.

- North Palace
- Southwest Palace
- Palace at the Sea
- Umm an Nasan village
- Security village

== Transportation ==
Umm an Nasan is connected to Bahrain Island and to Khobar, Saudi Arabia through the King Fahd Causeway. Umm an Nasan is connected to Jidda Island through the Jidda Causeway.

== Image gallery ==
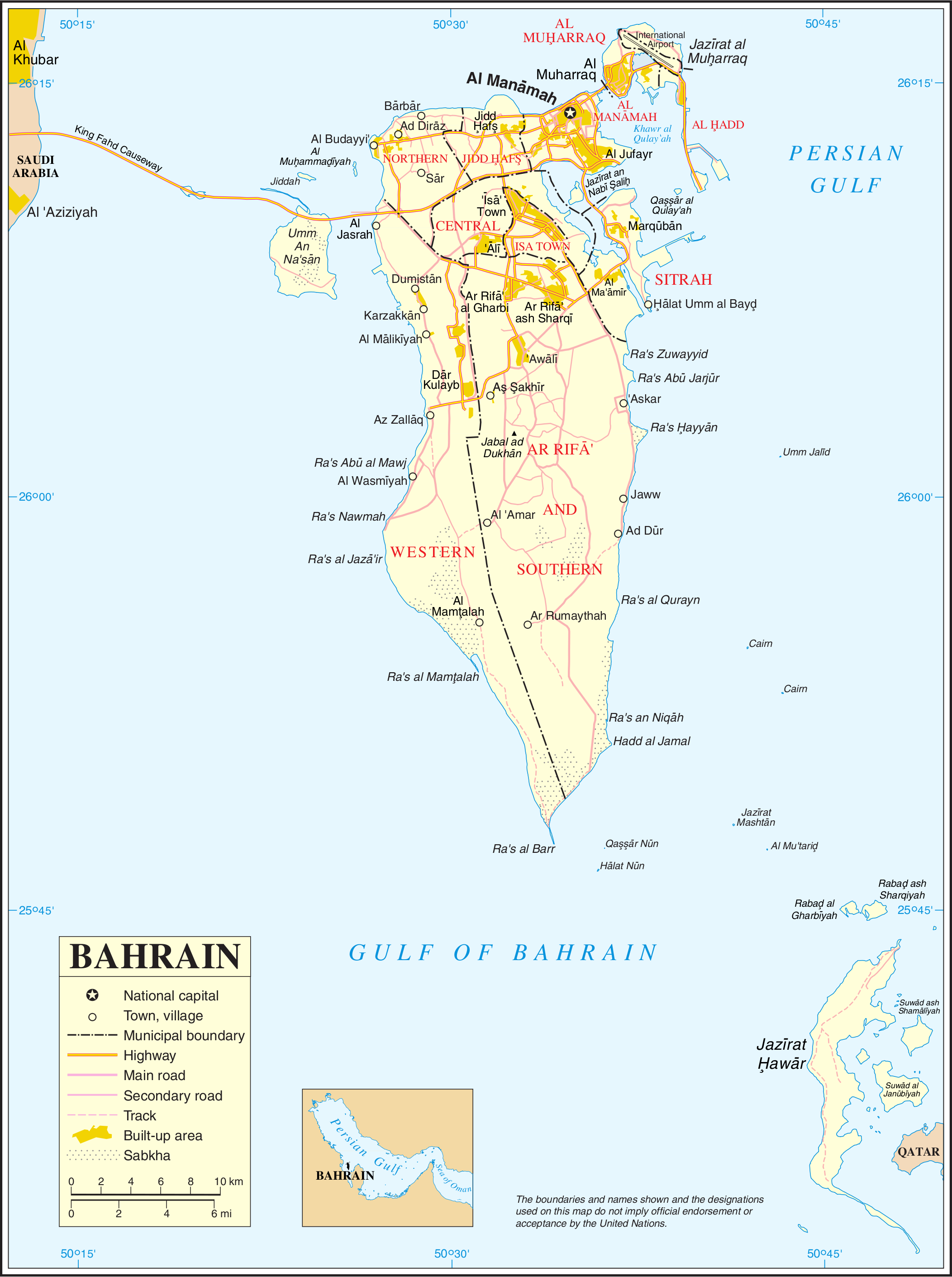
Map 1

District Map

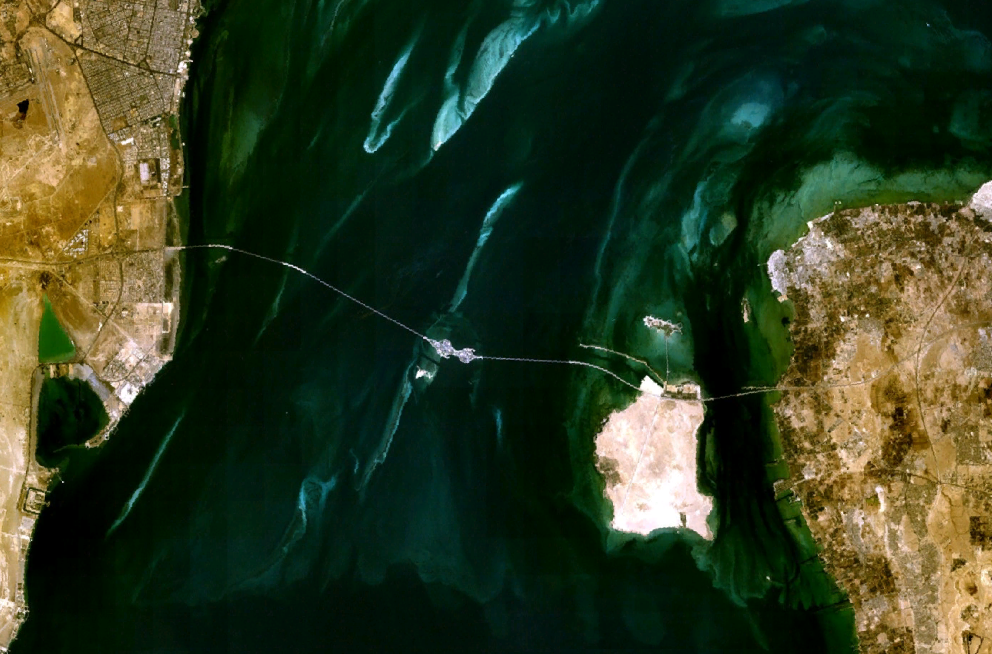
Umm an Nasan

== See also ==
- List of islands of Bahrain
