= Al Dair =

Al Dair الدَيْر
- Aerial view of Al Dair

- Location within Bahrain
- Coordinates: 26°17′6″N 50°37′26.4″E
- Country: Bahrain
- Island: Muharraq Island

Al Dair (Arabic: الدَيْر) is a village in Bahrain on the northern coast of Muharraq Island. It lies north of the Bahrain International Airport, and north west of Samaheej village.

Before the discovery of oil in Bahrain, most of the inhabitants were involved in farming, especially date palms, and fishing.

With its sea front, gardens and artesian springs, Al Dair was also a summer retreat for leading merchants of Muharraq. The pearl merchant Salman bin Hussain bin Matar built a large seaside house there, whose ruins survived until the early 1970s.

Similarly to Deir ez-Zor in Syria, the name Ad-Dair is Aramaic for "the monastery," indicating the Christian past of Muharraq Island.

Its inhabitants are mostly Shi’ite though there are a small number of Sunni Muslims as well.

== Name ==
Al-Dair comes from the word dair (Arabic: دير) which is defined in Arabic dictionaries as a Christian monastery. The origin of the name of the village is thought to have originated from the presence of a dair in the village named Dair Al-Rahib (Arabic: دير الراهب, lit. 'Monastery of the Monk'), in the past, which alludes to its Christian origins. Today, there is a mosque in the village named Masjid Al-Rahib (Arabic: مسجد الراهب, lit. 'Mosque of the Monk') which is believed to be the site of the former monastery.

== Education ==
The Ministry of Education operates government schools in Al-Dair, Al-Dair Primary Intermediate Girls School and Al-Dair Primary Boys School.
