= Al Sayah Island =

Uninhabited island in Bahrain

Al-Sayah Island (Arabic: جزيرة السايه, Jazīrat as-Saya), often referred to as "Kowkab As-Sayah" or "Chowchab As-Sayah" colloquially, is an uninhabited island within the archipelago of Bahrain located in the far north of the country, lying close to the island of Muharraq.

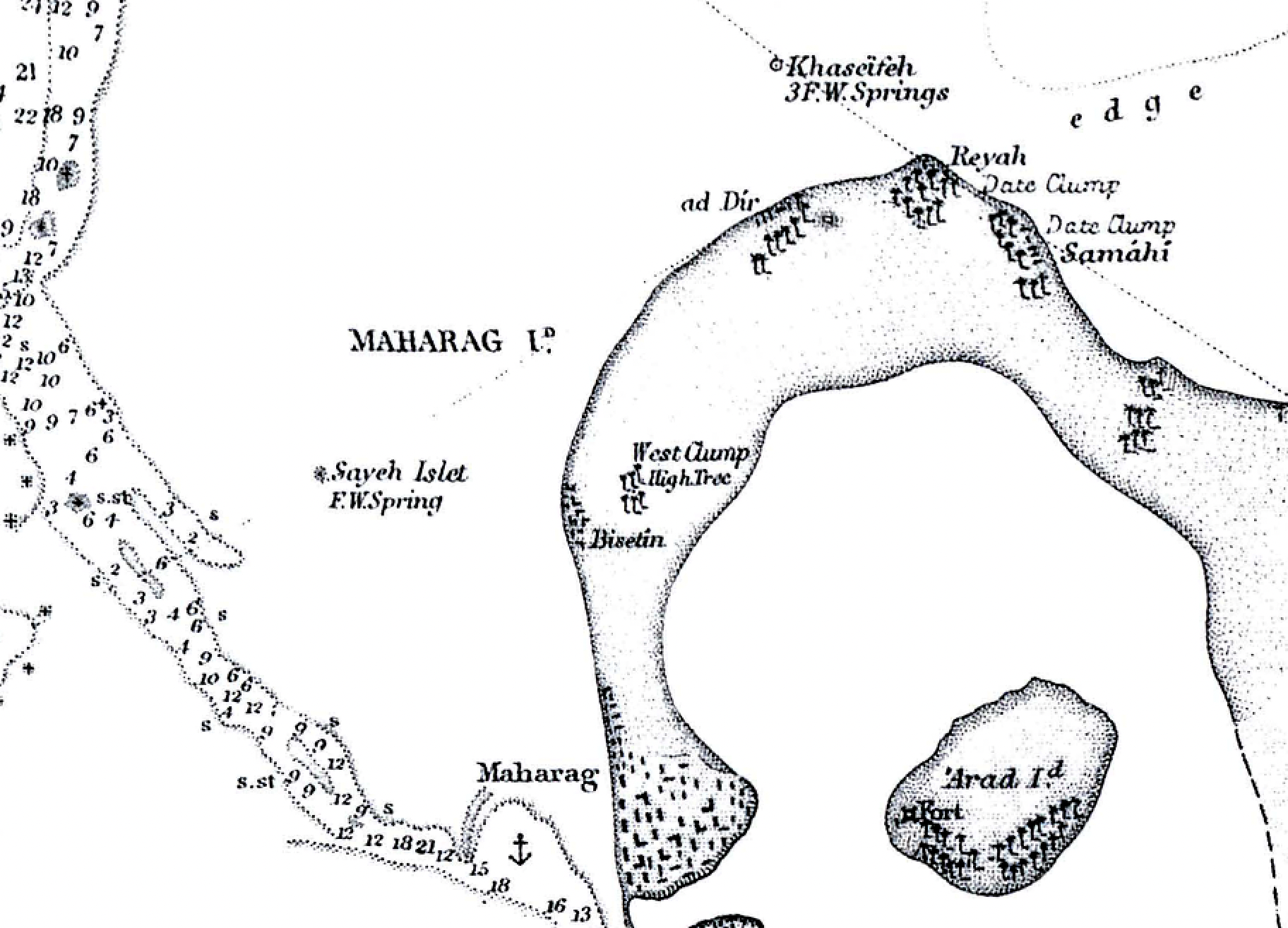
Map showing Al Sayah Island, off the Muharraq shore, 1914

== Geography ==
Sayah island is in relatively shallow waters of the Persian Gulf. The island is made of mostly coral rocks, and hosts the Sayah water spring. The island is elevated a meter above sea level and has little variation within its elevation.

== History ==
In 2022, British archaeologists discovered that the island could be considered as the oldest permanent artificial island in the world. Created at least 1,200 years ago, the island was used as an outpost for natural spring water, later Bahraini people used it as an important pearling outpost in the sea.

The island was created by creating a cistern or a water reservoir around the spring to contain freshwater emerging from the rocky seafloor. A thick circular wall was constructed around the cistern to form a small island, smaller than 20 meters wide, which was fortified by creating another curved wall to form an island of about 40 meters wide. Old piles of pearl oysters mixed with pottery from the seventh to eighth centuries AD cover most parts of the island.

In February 2022, Bahrain started to protect the island, which has almost started to disappear, by registering it on the National Heritage List.
