= Muharraq Governorate =

Governorate of Bahrain

Coordinates: 26°15′N 50°37′E

Muharraq Governorate محافظة المحرق Muḥāfaẓat al-Muḥarraq
- Governorate
- Flag

- Map of Bahrain showing Muharraq Governorate
- Country: Bahrain

Government
  - Governor: Salman bin Isa bin Hindi

Area
  - Total: 66.74 km^{2} (25.77 sq mi)

Population (2020)
  - Total: 268,106
  - Density: 4,017/km^{2} (10,400/sq mi)
- Time zone: UTC+3 (Arabia Standard Time)

The Muharraq Governorate (Arabic: محافظة المحرق, romanized: Muḥāfaẓat al-Muḥarraq) is one of the four governorates of Bahrain. It is now co-extensive with the municipality of Al Muharraq and with Muharraq Island together with outlying islets. It includes the former municipality of Al Hadd at the southern end of that island.

The centre of Muharraq contains some of the oldest residential properties in the Kingdom, many of which have been rented out by their Bahraini owners to expatriate workers. There are also many buildings of historic interest in the town's crowded lanes, including the Shaikh Isa bin Ali House, Siyadi House, the wind towers, the infamous Falcon Statue and the neighbourhood of journalist Abdullah Al Zayed House, as well as the impressive Arad Fort.

The government has been accused on not putting enough money into the restoration of these historic sites to turn them into tourist attractions. The head of Salafist Asalah party, Ghanim Al Buaneen, responded to news that the government was to invest BD5 million into protecting these sites by dismissing the amount as too little and said the island needed between BD50 million and BD100 million for the facelift of entire old areas. Al-Menbar Islamic Society MP Dr Ali Ahmed said the effort to preserve Bahrain's traditions had not been a success story due to the government's poor planning and the public unawareness about the initiatives.

Local councillor Majeed Karimi came to international prominence in 2005 when his spearheaded Islamist party, Al Wefaq's campaign decided to ban lingerie mannequins, blaming them for rising divorce rates in the area. While Al-Menbar Islamic Society local councillor, Saleh Al Jowder, launched his bid for a parliamentary seat in 2006's election by announcing that the council would deal with complaints about peeping toms by fitting all multistorey buildings with one way glass so that residents cannot see out.

Muharraq island is also the site of Bahrain International Airport, although the local Asalah MP has called for it to be relocated because the sound of aeroplanes landing and taking off has disturbed local residents.
