= Muharraq Island =

Island in Bahrain archipelago

Muharraq
Native name: جزيرة المحرق (Arabic)
- Location within Bahrain

Geography
- Location: Persian Gulf
- Coordinates: 26.25°N 50.65°E
- Archipelago: Bahrain
- Adjacent to: Persian Gulf
- Total islands: 1
- Major islands: Muharraq
- Area: 72.05 km^{2} (27.82 sq mi)
- Length: 18 km (11.2 mi)
- Width: 5.5 km (3.42 mi)
- Coastline: 50 km (31 mi)
- Highest elevation: 10 m (30 ft)
- Highest point: Al Muharraq

Administration
- Bahrain
- Governorate: Muharraq Governorate
- Largest settlement: Al Muharraq (pop. 100,000)

Demographics
- Demonym: Bahraini
- Population: 200,000 (2014)
- Pop. density: 4,057/km^{2} (10508/sq mi)
- Ethnic groups: Bahraini 62.4%, non-Bahraini 37.6%

Additional information
- Time zone: AST (UTC+3)
- ISO code: BH-14
- Official website: www.bahrain.com

Muharraq Island (Arabic: جزيرة المحرق), formerly known as Moharek, is the second largest island in the archipelago of Bahrain after Bahrain Island. It lies 4 km (2.5 mi) east of the capital, Manama, on Bahrain Island.

== History ==
The island is named after Muharraq City, the former capital of Bahrain. The Al Khalifa dynasty settled there in the nineteenth century and resided there until 1923. The island dominated the trade, fishing and especially pearls industries in Bahrain. The pearl center was made a UNESCO world heritage site in 2012. In recent years, major reclamation of artificial islands like Amwaj Islands has taken place north of Muharraq Island. In the south of the island, at Hidd district, the new Bahrain International Investment Park (BIIP) of the free zone was built. In the far south, the Khalifa Bin Salman Port which opened in 2009.

== Demography ==
Several towns and villages are located on the island, including:

- Al Muharraq
- Al Dair
- Arad, formerly a separate island of its own
- Busaiteen
- Hidd
- Galali
- Halat Bu Maher
- Samaheej

== Administration ==
The island belongs to Muharraq Governorate.

== Transportation ==
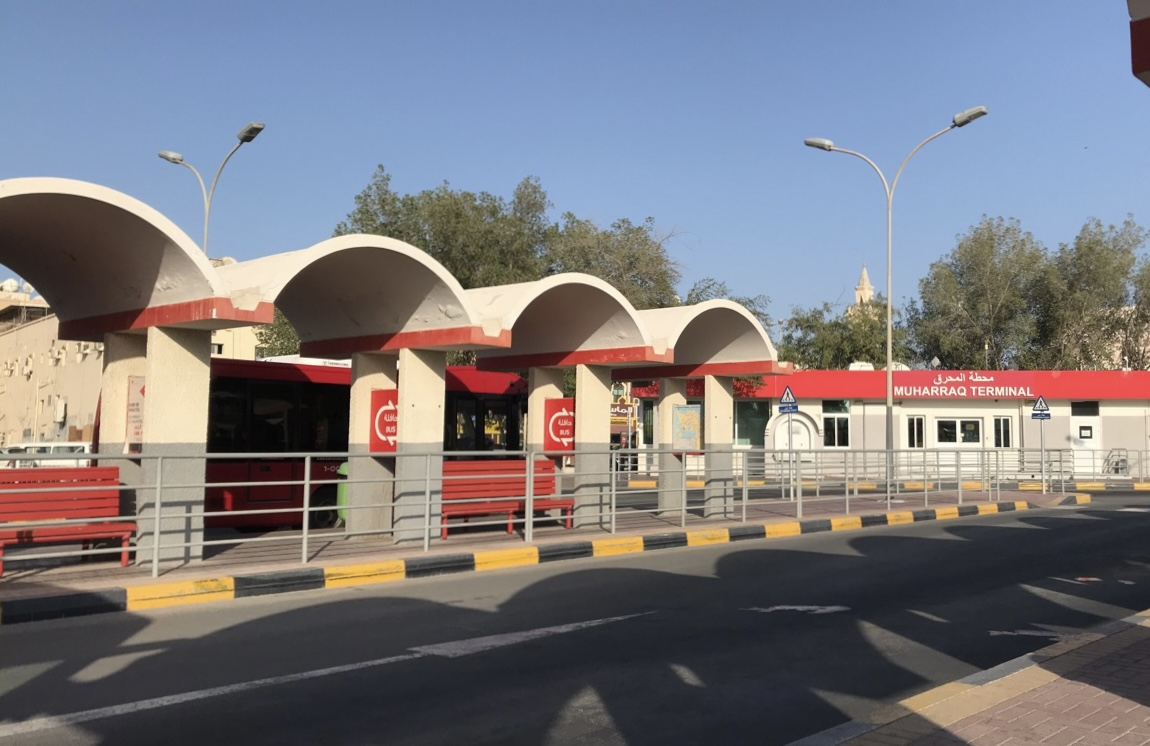
Muharraq Bus Terminal

The island has the 4,000 metres (13,000 ft) Bahrain International Airport (IATA: BAH, ICAO: OBBI) that follows the long east–west axis. The island has the 900 metres (3,000 ft) Muharraq Airfield (ICAO code:none) adjacent to Bahrain International Airport. There are three causeways connecting Muharraq Island with Manama on Bahrain Island:

- Shaikh Hamad Bridge: From Muharraq City to Diplomatic Area
- Shaikh Isa bin Salman Causeway: From Muharraq City/Busaiteen to Diplomatic Area
- Shaikh Khalifa Bridge: From Hidd to Juffair

== Image gallery ==
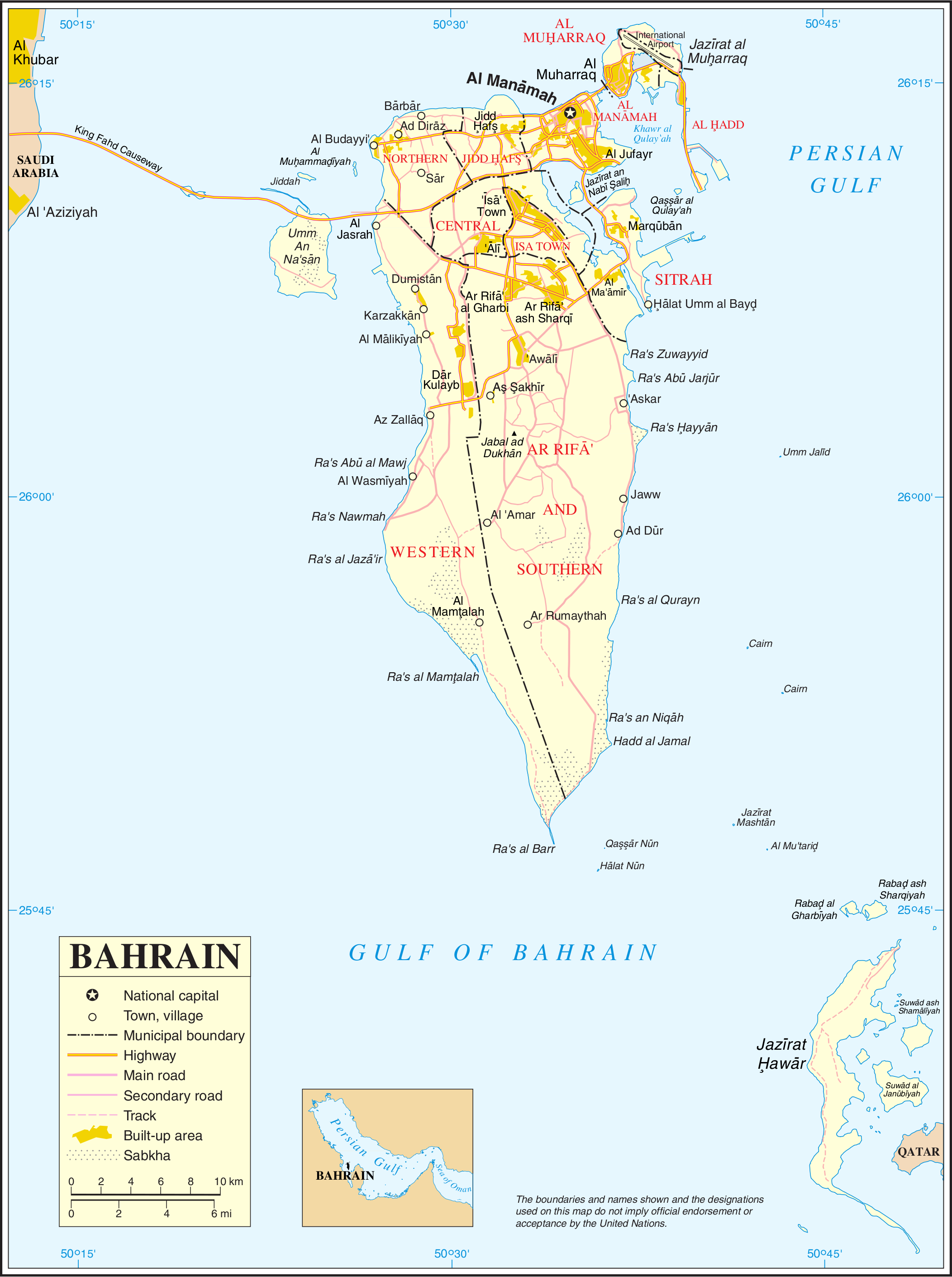
Map 1

District Map

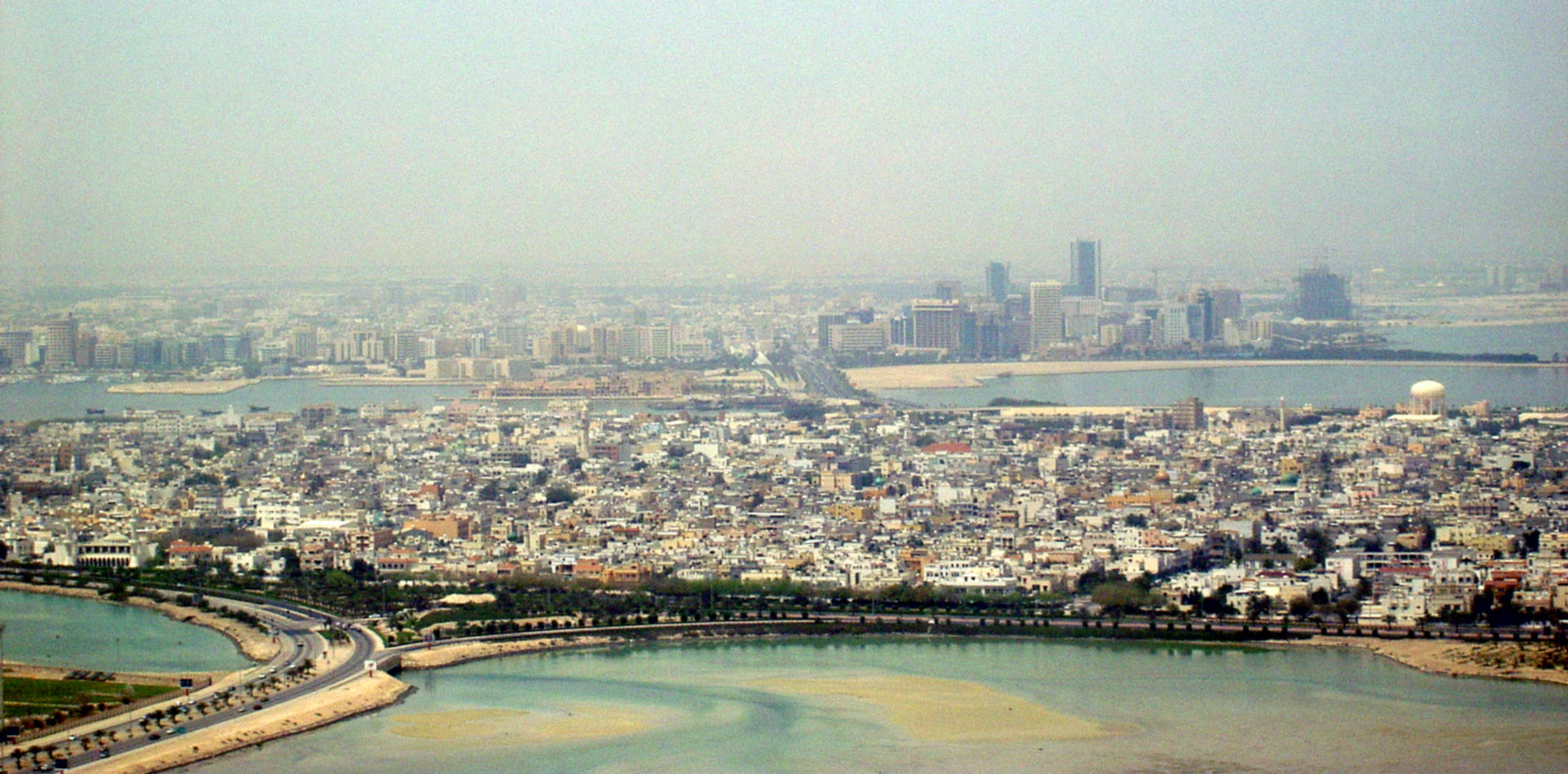
Muharraq in the foreground; Manama on Bahrain Island in the background

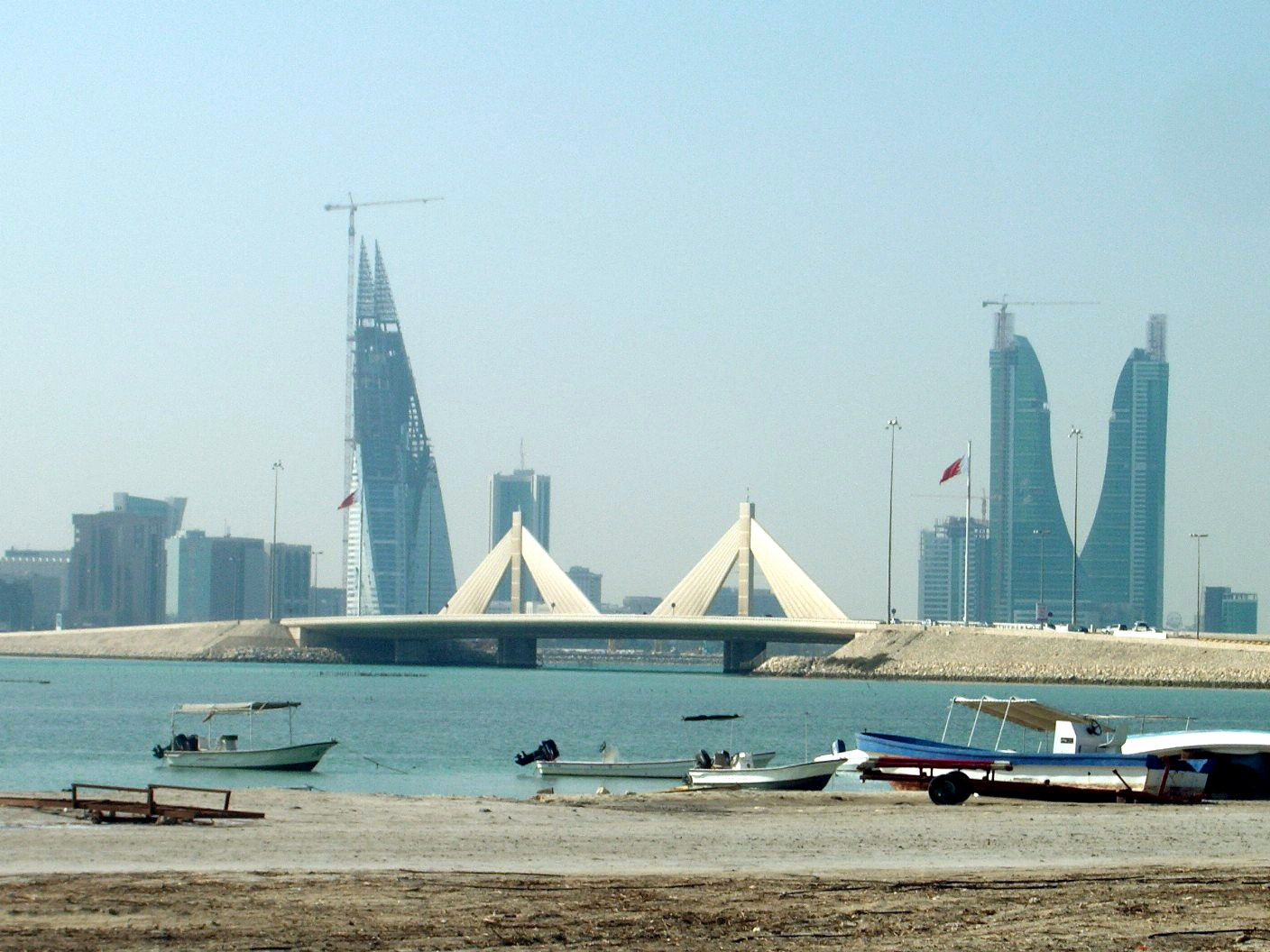
Shaikh Isa bin Salman Causeway

== See also ==
- List of islands of Bahrain

== Bibliography ==
- Baynes, T. S., ed. (1878), "Bahrein" , Encyclopædia Britannica, vol. 3 (9th ed.), New York: Charles Scribner's Sons, p. 240.
- Holdich, Thomas Hungerford (1911), "Bahrein Islands" , in Chisholm, Hugh (ed.), Encyclopædia Britannica, vol. 3 (11th ed.), Cambridge University Press, p. 212.
