= Khalifa Bin Salman Port =

- Interactive map of Khalifa Bin Salman Port

Location
- Country: Bahrain
- Location: Hidd Industrial City, Muharraq
- Coordinates: 26.190°N 50.714°E
- UN/LOCODE: KBSP

Details
- Opened: 2009
- Operated by: APM Terminals — Bahrain
- Type of Harbor: Deep Water
- Land area: 110 hectares
- No. of berths: 9

Statistics
- Annual revenue: BD 131,962,215

Khalifa Bin Salman Port (Arabic: ميناء خليفة بن سلمان) is a seaport located in the Hidd Industrial Area in Muharraq, Bahrain. It is the principal deep-water commercial port of Bahrain and serves as Bahrain’s main gateway for containerized, general, and roll-on/roll-off cargo, playing a central role in the country’s logistics, trade, and industrial sectors.

The port is named after Khalifa bin Salman Al Khalifa, the former prime minister of Bahrain.

== History ==
Khalifa Bin Salman Port was officially inaugurated in April 2009, reducing the reliance on the older Mina Salman Port as Bahrain’s primary commercial port. The development of the port formed part of Bahrain’s broader strategy to modernize its infrastructure, enhance trade competitiveness, and establish the country as a regional logistics hub in the Persian Gulf.

The port was developed through a public-private partnership and was among the first ports in the region to be operated by a global terminal operator. Since its opening, KBSP has handled the majority of Bahrain’s import and export cargo, supporting the country’s non-oil economic diversification.

== Location ==
The port sits on approximately 110 hectares of reclaimed land situated in the Hidd Industrial Area, on the northeastern coast of Bahrain, approximately 10 km from Bahrain International Airport and is connected to Persian Gulf shipping lanes. Its location provides direct access to major industrial zones, including aluminum smelters, manufacturing facilities, and logistics parks. The port is also connected by road to the King Fahd Causeway, enabling overland trade with Saudi Arabia.

== Facilities ==
The port features modern infrastructure designed to handle large vessels and a wide range of cargo types – the port includes a deep-water container terminal with an approximately 1,800‑meter-long quay equipped with post‑Panamax ship‑to‑shore gantry cranes, enabling it to accommodate large container ships operating on regional and international routes. In addition to container handling facilities, the port has dedicated areas for general cargo, bulk and breakbulk cargo, roll‑on/roll‑off (Ro‑Ro) operations, and a passenger cruise terminal. Supporting infrastructure includes extensive warehousing and bonded storage areas, customs and inspection facilities, and advanced terminal operating systems that enhance cargo handling efficiency and security. The port’s overall design and equipment allow it to handle container volumes in the millions of twenty‑foot equivalent units (TEUs) annually, positioning it as a key logistics hub in the Persian Gulf.
