= Bahrain Island =

Island in the Gulf of Bahrain

Native name: جزيرة البحرين Nickname: Awal Island
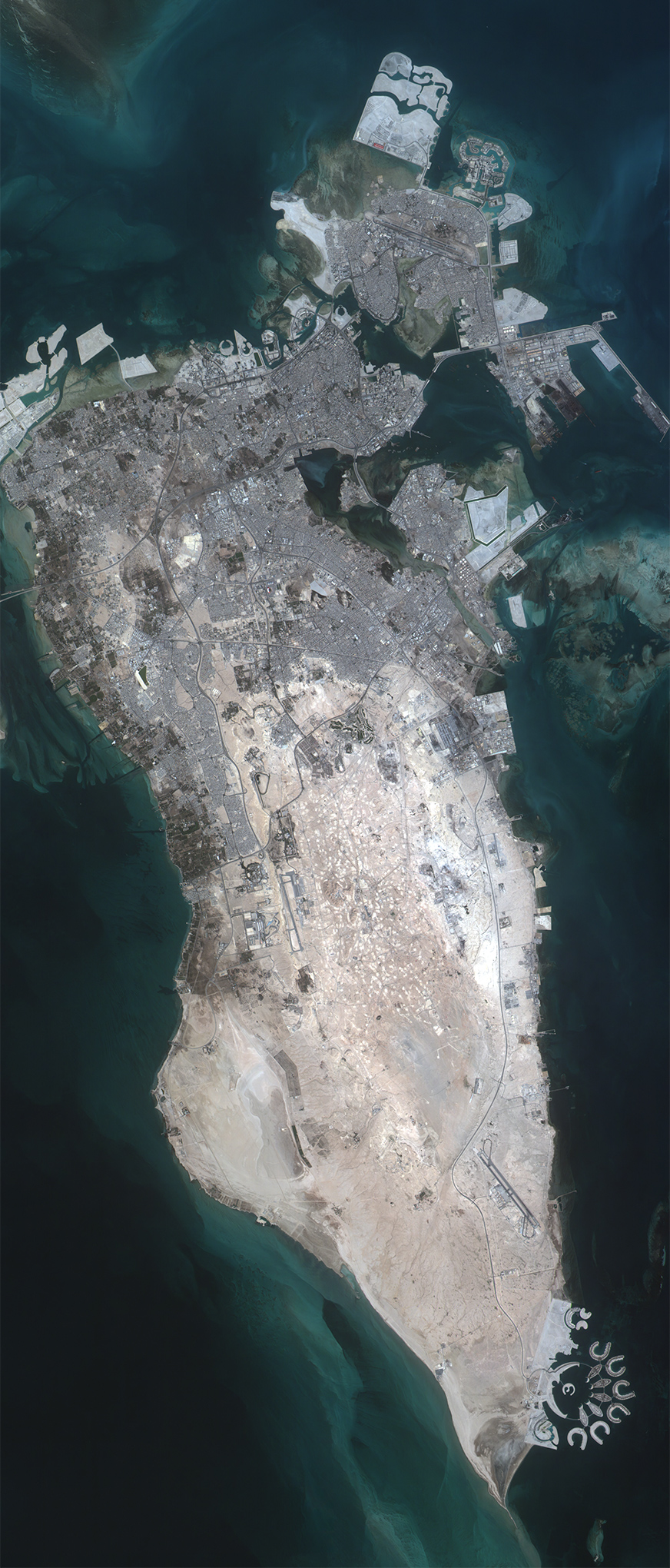

- Location within Persian Gulf

Geography
- Location: Gulf of Bahrain
- Coordinates: 26.03°N 50.55°E
- Archipelago: Bahrain
- Adjacent to: Persian Gulf
- Total islands: 5
- Area: 604 km^{2} (233 sq mi)
- Length: 51 km (31.7 mi)
- Width: 18 km (11.2 mi)
- Coastline: 130 km (81 mi)
- Highest elevation: 134 m (440 ft)
- Highest point: Mountain of Smoke

Administration
- Bahrain
- Governorates: Northern Governorate; Southern Governorate; Capital Governorate
- Largest settlement: Manama (pop. 350,000)

Demographics
- Demonym: Bahraini
- Population: 1,221,849 (2025)
- Pop. density: 1,980/km^{2} (5130/sq mi)
- Ethnic groups: Bahraini, non-Bahraini

Additional information
- Time zone: AST (UTC+3)
- ISO code: BH-14
- Official website: www.bahrain.com

Bahrain Island (Arabic: جزيرة البحرين Jazīrah al-Baḥrayn), also known as Awal Island and formerly as Bahrein, is the largest island within the archipelago of Bahrain, and forms the bulk of the country's land mass while hosting the majority of its population.

== Geography ==
Most of the island of Bahrain is in a relatively shallow inlet of the Persian Gulf known as the Gulf of Bahrain. The seabed adjacent to Bahrain is rocky and, mainly off the northern part of the island, covered by extensive coral reefs. Most of the island is low-lying and barren desert. Outcroppings of limestone form low rolling hills, stubby cliffs, and shallow ravines. The limestone is covered by various densities of saline sand, capable of supporting only the hardiest desert vegetation such as chiefly thorn trees and scrubs. A 5 km (3.1 mi) wide fertile strip of land exists along the northern coast on which date, almond, fig, and pomegranate trees grow. The interior contains an escarpment that rises to 134 m (440 ft), the highest point on the island, to form the Mountain of Smoke, named as such due to the mists that often wreathe the summit. Most of the country's oil wells are situated in the vicinity of the mountain.

== Climate ==
The climatic conditions of the area are arid. The average annual temperature in the area is 28 °C. The warmest month is August, when the average temperature is 38 °C and the coldest is January, with 18 °C. The average annual rainfall is 144 millimeters. The rainiest month is November, with an average of 38 mm of precipitation, and the driest is October, with 1 mm of precipitation.

== Demography ==
Manama, the capital of the kingdom of Bahrain, is located on the northeastern tip of the Island of Bahrain. The main port, Mina Salman, is also located on the island, as are the major oil refining facilities and commercial centers.

== Administration ==
The island is split between 3 of the Bahrain's Governorates.

== Transportation ==
Causeways and bridges connect Bahrain to adjacent islands and the mainland of Saudi Arabia. The oldest causeway, originally constructed in 1929, links Bahrain to Muharraq Island, the third largest island. There are three causeways connecting Muharraq Island with Manama on Bahrain Island:

- Shaikh Hamad Bridge: From Muharraq City to Diplomatic Area
- Shaikh Isa bin Salman Causeway: From Muharraq City/Busaiteen to Diplomatic Area
- Shaikh Khalifa Bridge: From Hidd to Juffair

At its eastern shore is lying Sitra, site of the main oil export terminal, which is linked to Bahrain by a bridge that spans the narrow channel separating the two islands. At its western shore, a causeway to the island of Umm an Nasan, continues on to the Saudi mainland town of Al Khobar through the King Fahd Causeway. Umm an Nasan is the private property of the king and the site of his personal game preserve.

== Gallery ==
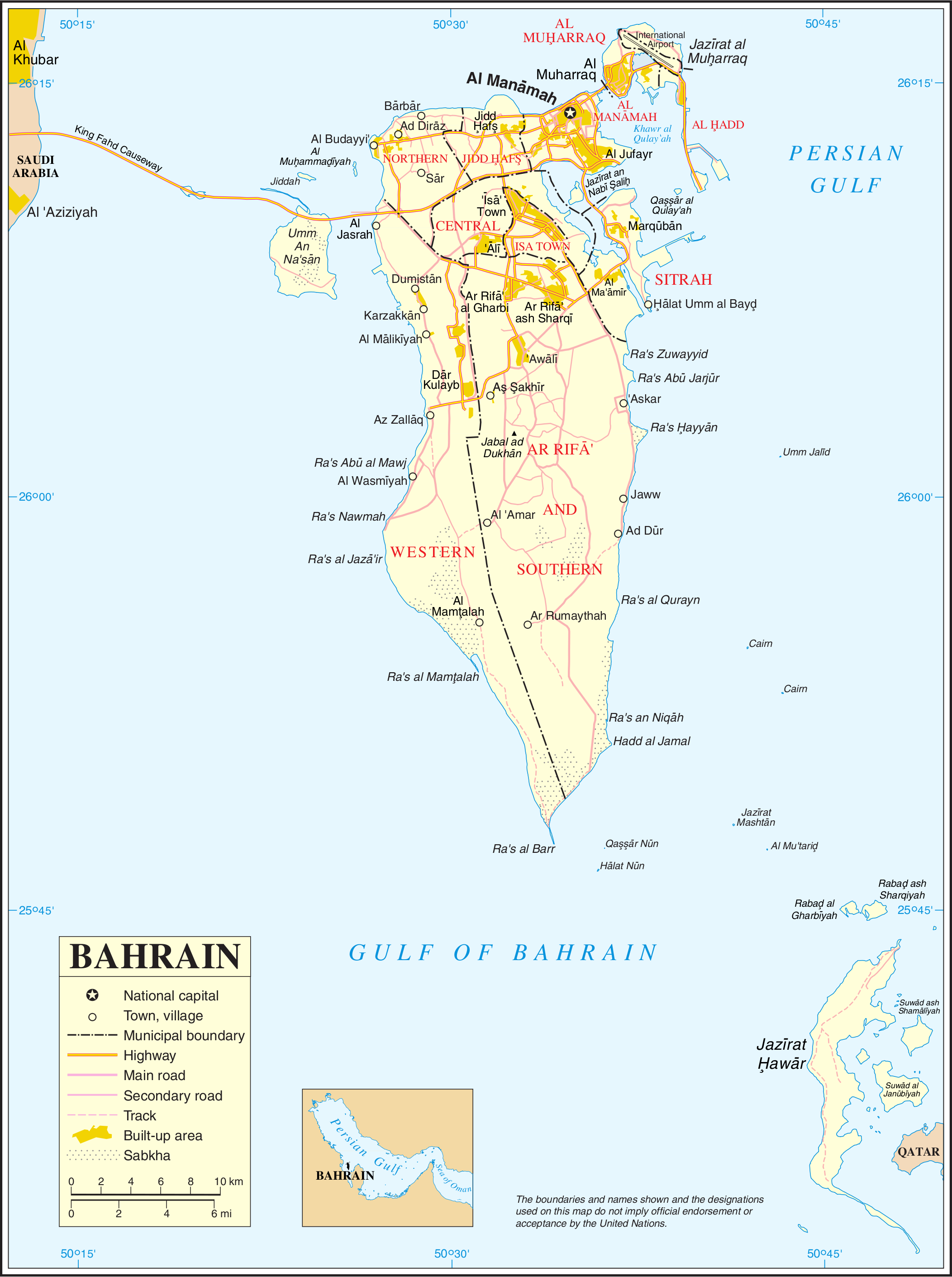
Map 1

Map Districts

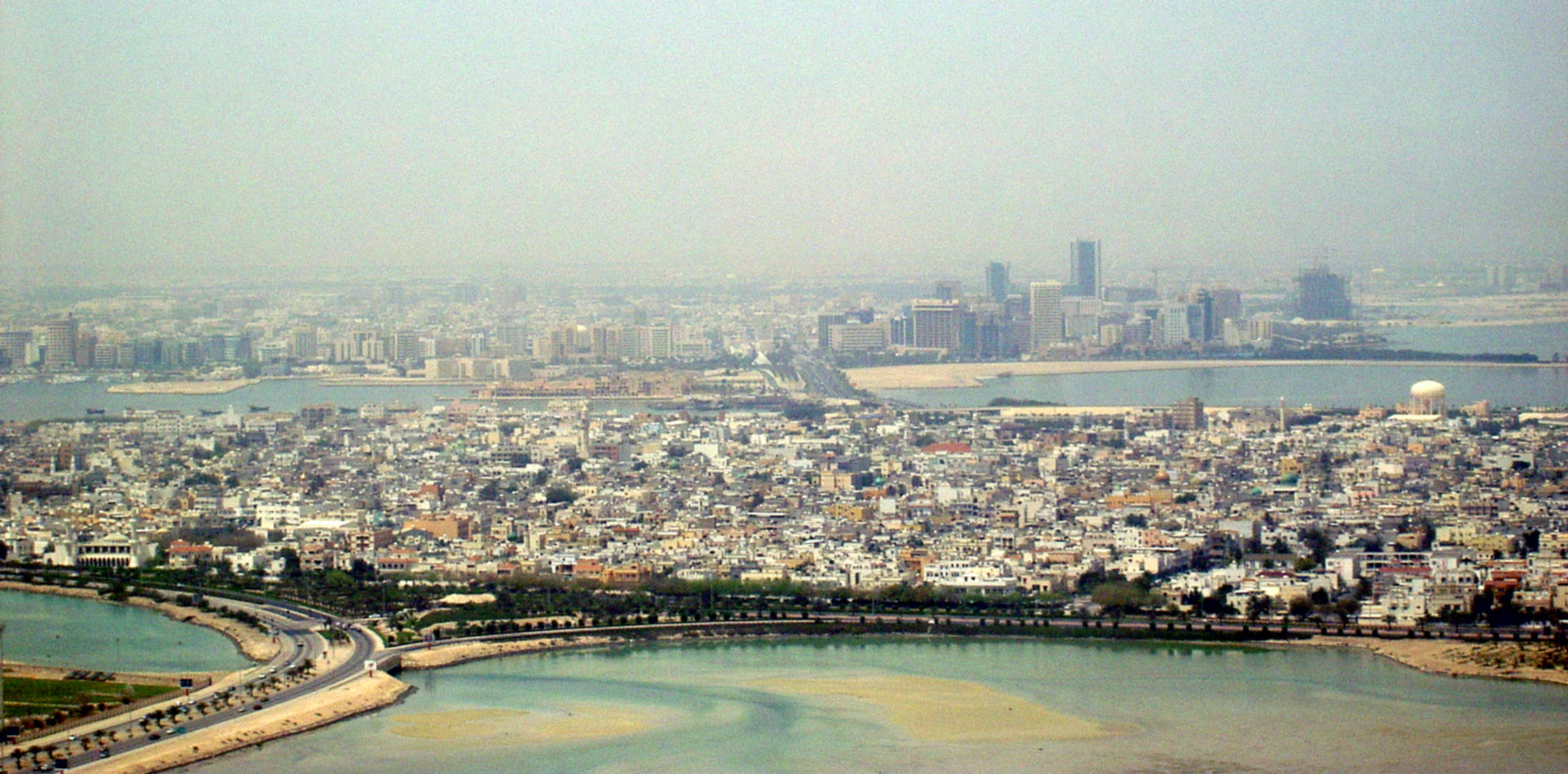
Muharraq in the foreground; Manama on Bahrain Island in the background

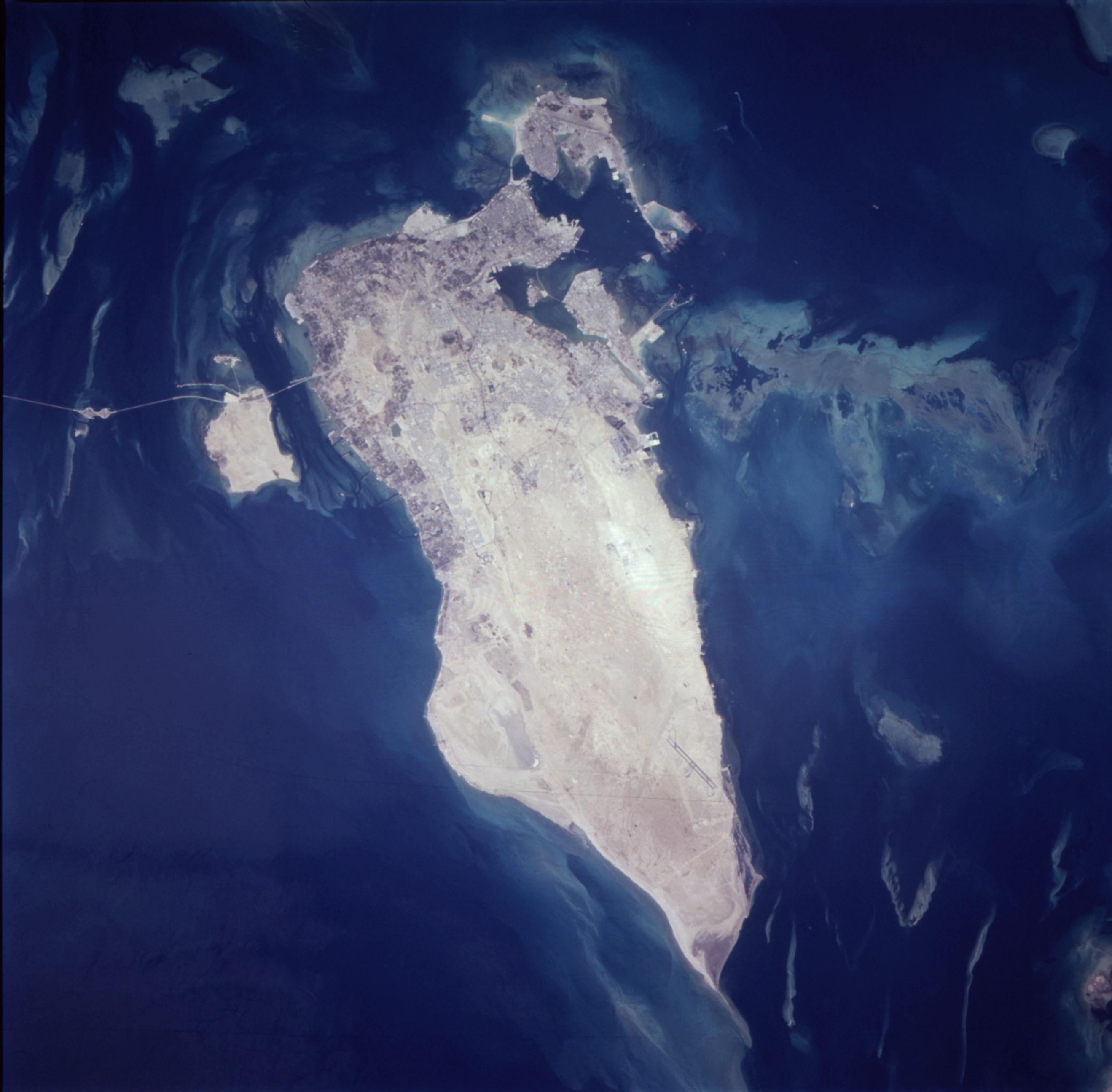
Bahrain Island (center) seen from space.

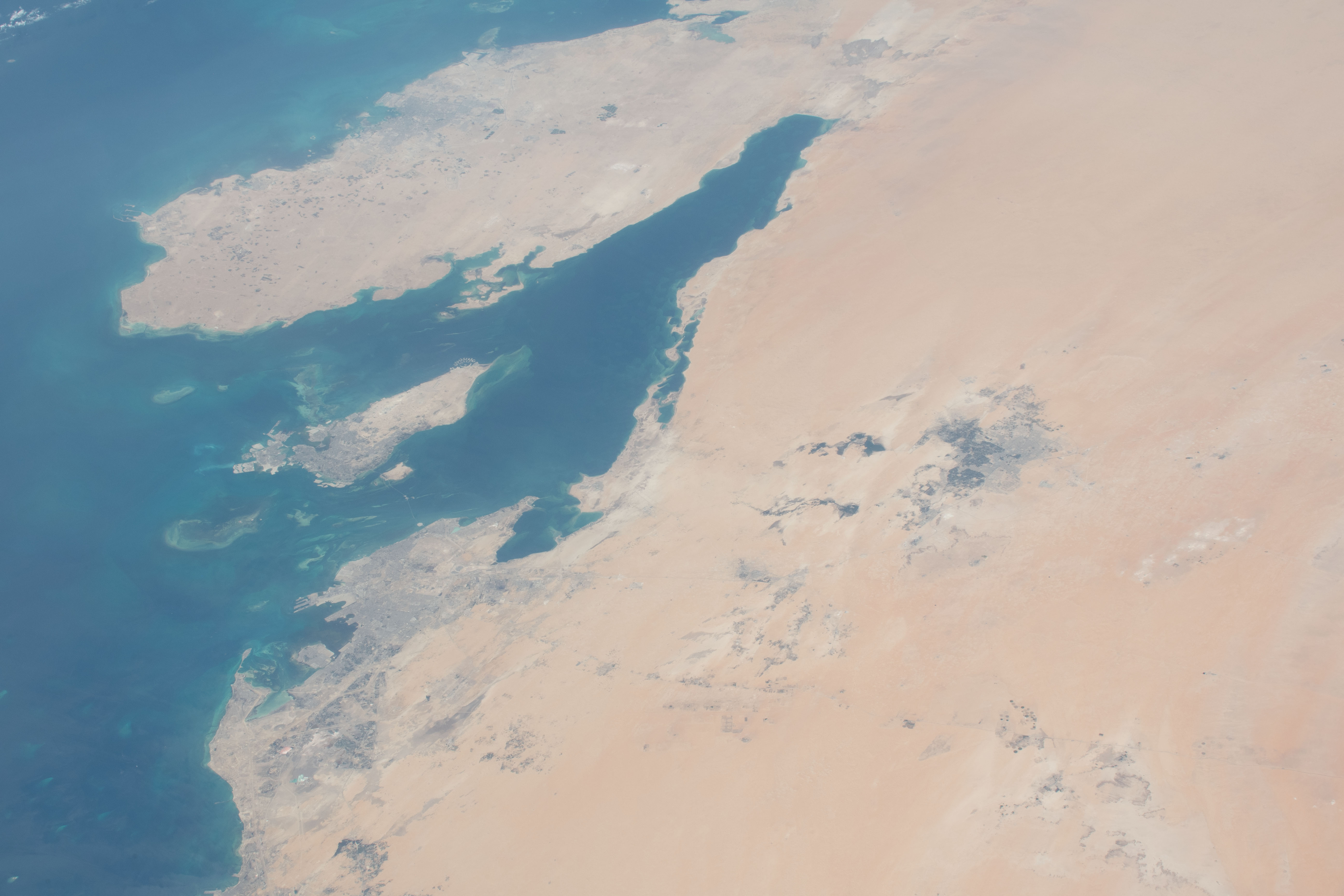
View from the International Space Station of the Gulf of Bahrain, facing southeast, with Qatar visible at top, and Bahrain Island off it

== See also ==
- List of islands of Bahrain
- Muharraq Island
