= Cassarà =

Cassarà is a Sicilian surname, either derived from the town of Cassaro or from cassaru, "box- or case-maker". Notable people with the surname include:

- Andrea Cassarà (born 1984), Italian fencer
- Andrew Cassara (born 1995), Canadian singer-songwriter
- Frank Cassara (1928–2017), American football player
- Joseph Cassara (born 1989), American writer
- Lucia Cassarà (born 1999), Italian pianist and writer
- Maxime Cassara (born 1991), French footballer
- Michael Cassara (born 1981), American casting director, educator and genealogist
- Mo Cassara (born 1973), American basketball coach
- Ninni Cassarà (1947–1985), Italian policeman and mafia victim

== See also ==
- Campiglossa cassara, a species of fruit flies
- Cassar
- Cassarino
- Cassaro (disambiguation)
