= Kasar =

Kasar may refer to:

- Qasar, a brother of Genghis Khan
- Kaşar, a type of cheese
- Kasar, Çine, a village in Turkey
- Jarek Kasar (born 1983), Estonian singer
- Karin Kasar, member of the German music band Real McCoy
- Kudret Kasar (1914–2003), Turkish equestrian
- Kasar Devi, village in Almora, Uttarakhand, India
- Kasar Amboli, village in Pune, Maharashtra, India
- Kasar Vadavali, neighborhood of Thane, Maharashtra, India
- Kasar Block, sub-division in Sheikhpura, Bihar, India including Karimabigha
- Mohammad Ajmal Amir Kasar or Ajmal Kasab, Pakistani militant, member of Lashkar-e-Taiba
- Twashta Kasar, or Kasar, a Hindu artisan caste in the Indian states of Maharashtra and Goa

== See also ==
- Kassar, an Arabic surname
- Casar (disambiguation)
