= Kassar =

Kassar is an Arabic surname with two distinctive and different pronunciation and meaning, as قصار (with the qaf) or كسار (with the kaf). It may also carry the definite article as Al Kassar (being القصار or الكسار according to the qaf/kaf origin).

Notable people with the surname include:

with the qaf origin (قصار)

- Adnan Kassar (1930–2025), Lebanese lawyer, banker, businessman and politician
- Mario Kassar (born 1951), Lebanese film producer and industry executive
- Mireille Kassar (born 1963), Lebanese artist
- Nadim Kassar, Lebanese businessman and banker

with the kaf origin (كسار)

- Ahmed Al-Kassar, Saudi Arabian football player
- Fahad Al-Kassar (born 1973), Emirati football referee
- Monzer al-Kassar (born 1945), also known as the "Prince of Marbella", Syrian international arms dealer
- Sami Kassar, Saudi Arabian football player

Others

- Ami Kassar, American small business advocate and loan broker
- Ray Kassar (1928–2017), American businessman and entrepreneur. President of Burlington Industries, Atari Inc. and others

== See also ==
- Cassar, variant of Kassar, predominantly in Malta, but also in the Arab World
- Qassar (disambiguation)
  - Qassar Khusayfah, group of islets in Bahrain
  - Qassar al Qulay`ah, an island of Bahrain
