= Nancy Opel =

American singer and actress (born 1956)

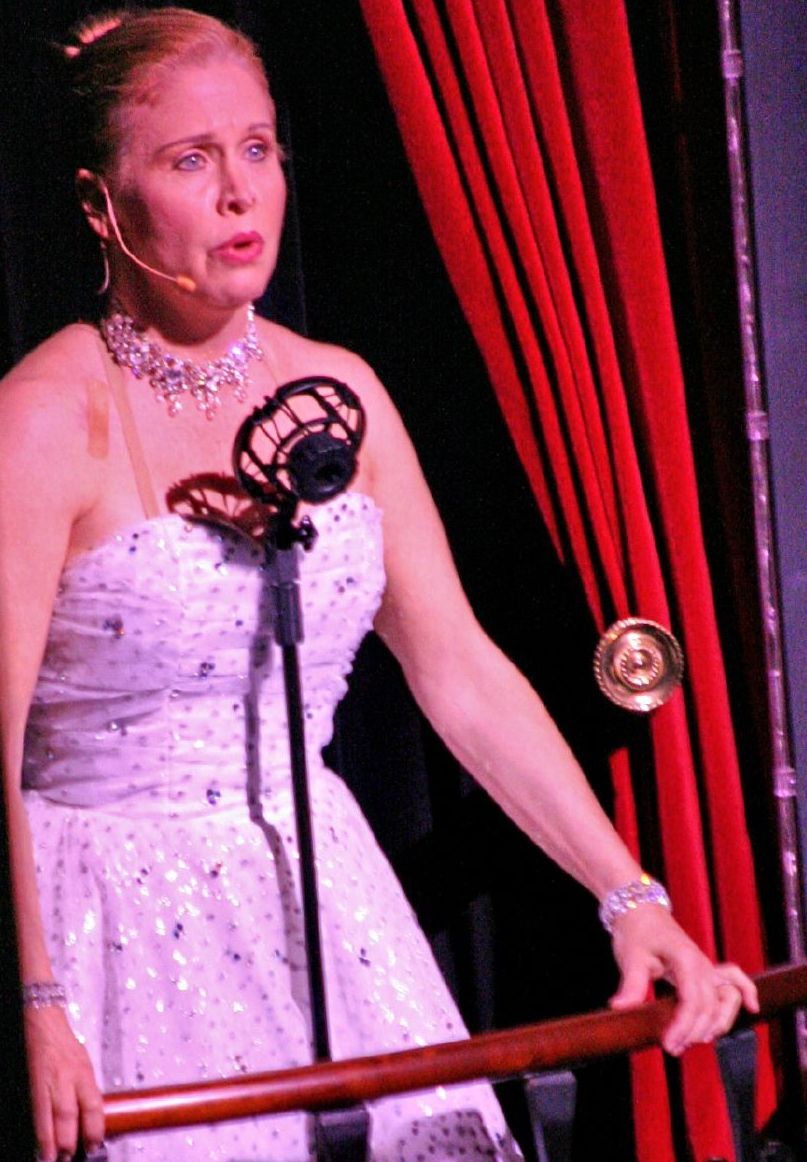
- Opel performing in 2006.
- Born: 1956 (age 69–70); Kansas, U.S.
- Education: Juilliard School
- Occupation: Actress
- Years active: 1978–present
- Children: 1

Nancy Carol Opel is an American singer and actress, known primarily for her work on Broadway. She was nominated for the 2002 Tony Award for Best Actress in a Musical for originating the role of Penelope Pennywise in the musical Urinetown.

== Life and career ==
Opel grew up in the Kansas communities of Prairie Village and Leawood, and graduated from Shawnee Mission East High School. She trained at the Juilliard School.

She has appeared on Broadway in Evita as Eva Perón (1979), Teddy & Alice (1987), Sunday in the Park with George as Frieda / Betty (1984), Anything Goes (replacement Hope Harcourt), Triumph of Love (1997) as Corine Fiddler on the Roof (2004) as Yente, Memphis as Mama in 2011 and 2012 and Cinderella as Madame (the Stepmother) in June 2014 to September 7, 2014. She performed the roles of Mazeppa and Miss Cratchitt in the Encores! staged concert of Gypsy in 2007.

Opel portrayed Kafka in the Off-Broadway debut of David Ives' one-acter, Words, Words, Words, which ran at Primary Stages in November 1993 to February 1994 She appeared in another Ives play, Polish Joke, which ran Off-Broadway in a Manhattan Theatre Club production in February to April 2003. Opel played several characters, and was nominated for the 2003 Drama Desk Award, Outstanding Featured Actress in a Play.

Opel played the title character in the first national tour of The Drowsy Chaperone, which started in September 2007.

In the 2008 rock musical The Toxic Avenger, she played three characters: the Mayor, Toxie's Mother, and a nun. The musical was performed at the George Street Playhouse in New Brunswick, New Jersey in October 2008. She appeared in the musical Off-Broadway at New World Stages, starting in April 2009. For this role, she received a 2009 Drama Desk Award nomination for Outstanding Featured Actress in a Musical.

From November 2014 to April 2015 she appeared on Broadway in the musical Honeymoon in Vegas, and was nominated for the 2015 Drama Desk Award for Outstanding Featured Actress in a Musical.

She played the title role in Hello, Dolly! at Ford's Theatre in 2013. She appeared in Follies at the Repertory Theatre of St. Louis in September to October 2016, as Carlotta. She appeared in the new musical Curvy Widow: The Musical at the North Carolina Stage Company in October 2016.

It was announced on November 13, 2018, that Opel would be taking over the role of Madame Morrible in the Broadway production of Wicked, which she did from November 20, 2018 to January 20, 2020.

In 2021 Opel portrayed Carrie Chapman Catt in the historical musical The Suffragist, about the lives of Chapman Catt, Alice Paul, Ida B. Wells, Lucy Burns, and Anna Howard Shaw. The production was written by Cavan Hallman, with music by Nancy Hill Cobb, directed by Rachel Klein, and performed at the Gallagher Bluedorn Performing Arts Center.

In 2022, Opel started portraying Cinderella's Stepmother in the Broadway revival of Into the Woods. She reprised this role in the subsequent 2023 national tour.

Opel's television credits include Law & Order, Law & Order: Criminal Intent, and Law & Order: SVU. She is also an acting coach.

== Personal life ==
She resides with her daughter in Manhattan.

== Filmography ==
=== Film ===
Year	Title	Role	Notes
1997	The Ice Storm	Claudia White	
2003	Marci X	Reporter	
2005	The Producers	Ensemble	
2008	Phoebe in Wonderland	Woman in Home	
2013	Chasing Taste	Phyllis	

=== Television ===
Year	Title	Role	Notes
1975	Ryan's Hope	Sybil	2 episodes
1986	American Playhouse	Frieda / Betty	Episode: "Sunday in the Park with George"
1996, 2008	Law & Order	Doctor / Henkel	2 episodes
2003	Law & Order: Criminal Intent	Nina	Episode: "Suite Sorrow"
2006	Law & Order: SVU	Teri Carthage	Episode: "Infected"
2009	All My Children	Lucretia	3 episodes
2010	The Big C	Buttercup	Episode: "Taking the Plunge"
2013–2014	It Could Be Worse	Judy Gordon	5 episodes

=== Stage ===
Year	Title	Role	Notes
1979	Evita	Eva Peron (Replacement)	Broadway Theatre, Broadway
1984	Sunday in the Park with George	Frieda/Betty/Young Man	Booth Theatre, Broadway
1985	Personals	Louise	Minetta Lane Theatre, Off-Broadway
1987	Anything Goes	Hope Harcourt (Replacement)	Vivian Beaumont Theater, Broadway
1987	Teddy & Alice	Eleanor Roosevelt	Minskoff Theatre, Broadway
1993	All in the Timing	Performer	Primary Stages, Off-Broadway
1994	Sunday in the Park with George	Frieda/Betty	St. James Theatre, Broadway
1995	Don Juan in Chicago	Sandy	Primary Stages, Off-Broadway
1996	Getting Away With Murder	Dossie Lustig (Standby)/Pamela Prideaux (Standby)	Broadhurst Theatre, Broadway
1997	Triumph of Love	Corine	Royale Theatre, Broadway
1999	Ring Around the Moon	Capulat (Understudy)	Belasco Theatre, Broadway
2000	On a Clear Day You Can See Forever	Performer	New York City Center, Off-Broadway
2001	Urinetown	Penelope Pennywise	Henry Miller's Theatre, Broadway
2003	Polish Joke	Magda/Florist/Mrs. Flanagan/Olga/Zosia/Enid/Nurse	Manhattan Theatre Club, Off-Broadway
2004	Fiddler on the Roof	Yente	Minskoff Theatre, Broadway
2007	Gypsy	Mazeppa	New York City Center, Off-Broadway
2008	The Toxic Avenger	Mayor Babs Belgoody/Ma Ferd	George Street Playhouse
2009	Memphis	Mama (Replacement)	Shubert Theatre, Broadway
2010	Paradise Found	Soap Manufacturer's Wife	Menier Chocolate Factory, London
2013	Cinderella	Madame (Replacement)	Broadway Theatre, Broadway
2015	Honeymoon in Vegas	Bea Singer	Nederlander Theatre, Broadway
2015	Holiday Inn	Louise	The Muny
2016	Follies	Carlotta	The Repertory Theatre of St. Louis
2016	Do I Hear A Waltz?	Mrs. McIlhenny	New York City Center, Off-Broadway
2016	Beautiful: The Carole King Musical	Genie Klein (Replacement)	Stephen Sondheim Theatre, Broadway
2017	Curvy Widow	Bobby Goldman	Westside Theatre, Off-Broadway
2018	Hey, Look Me Over!	Performer	New York City Center, Off-Broadway
2018	Clue: On Stage	Mrs. Peacock	The Cape Playhouse, Massachusetts
2019	Wicked	Madame Morrible (Replacement)	Gershwin Theatre, Broadway
2022	Into the Woods	Cinderella's Stepmother	St. James Theatre, Broadway
2025	Steel Magnolias	Clairee	Bell Theatre, New Jersey
2025	A Christmas Carol	Ghost of Christmas Past	Perelman Performing Arts Center, Off-Broadway
