= Cassaro =

Cassaro (Italian pronunciation: [ˈkassaro]) may refer to:

== Places ==
- Cassaro, Sicily, a municipality in Syracuse, Sicily, Italy
- Cassaro, Palermo, a street in Palermo, Sicily, Italy
  - San Matteo al Cassaro, a church in Palermo

== People with the surname ==
- Gianfranco Cassaro (born 1999), Canadian ice hockey player
- Gianni Cassaro (born 1992), Spanish footballer
- Marcelo Cassaro (born 1970), Brazilian writer and game designer

== See also ==
- Cassar
- Cassarà
