= List of Aaron Stone episodes =

Aaron Stone is a Disney XD series that premiered on February 13, 2009, and ended on July 30, 2010. A total of 35 episodes were produced spanning 2 seasons.

== Series overview ==
Season	Episodes	Originally released	
Season	Episodes	First released	Last released
1	21	February 13, 2009	November 27, 2009
2	14	February 24, 2010	July 30, 2010

== Episodes ==
=== Season 1 (2009) ===
No. overall	No. in season	Title	Directed by	Written by	Original release date	Prod. code
1	1	"Hero Rising" (Part 1)	Érik Canuel & Pat Williams	Bruce Kalish	February 13, 2009	101
Charlie Landers is the best player in the online game, 'Hero Rising,' with his unstoppable crime-fighting avatar, Aaron Stone. Charlie's world is changed forever when a powerful billionaire reveals to him that Hero Rising is a testing game for real secret agents. Charlie is recruited to become the "real life" Aaron Stone and must fight crime against the evil Omega Defiance, a team of people who are out to destroy the world, but in his normal life he must keep super crime fighter Aaron Stone as his secret identity. Viewers: 1.6 million
2	2	"Hero Rising" (Part 2)	Pat Williams	Bruce Kalish	February 13, 2009	102
Aaron Stone is sent on his first mission to capture a toxin from Dr. Necros (Anthony J. Mifsud), one of the seven members of the Omega Defiance, and his right hand man, The Souljacker, who plan to release the toxin and turn people into zombies so he can take over the U.S.A. Viewers: 1.6 million
3	3	"First Strike"	Pat Williams	Kaita Mpambara	February 23, 2009	103
Aaron Stone is sent on a mission to stop General Cross, one of the Omega Defiance from using his "unstoppable" cyborg as a trojan horse to infiltrate and destroy T. Abner Hall.
4	4	"Time Out"	Andrew Potter	Gail Morgan Hickman	March 2, 2009	105
Kronis has created a device that freezes time, the first step in his plan for creating a time machine to gain control of the world. With the help of his son Dax, Kronis plans to steal formulas from science labs to create the time machine and Aaron Stone must figure out a way to defeat the duo before it's too late. Meanwhile, at home, Charlie must keep his grades up in school before he's put on academic probation and kicked off the basketball team.
5	5	"Rockin' The Free World"	Pat Williams	Dan Cross & David Hoge	March 9, 2009	104
Cerebella, a mind-control specialist is creating chaos after brainwashing children with a rock video so she and The Seven can take over the world. Aaron Stone enlists his Hero Rising friends to foil Cerebella's plans by hacking into her computer and destroying the video. Meanwhile, Stan fills in for Charlie as the lead singer at a school audition.
6	6	"From Hero to Xero"	Andrew Potter	Sean Cunningham & Marc Dworkin	March 16, 2009	106
Charlie, Jason and Emma are in detention at school one Saturday, when Charlie (Aaron Stone) is suddenly asked to fly to Tokyo to stop a young cyber-tech genius, Xero, from stealing from The Citizen's Gold Depository. When Aaron Stone fails to follow orders, he puts his life in jeopardy and needs to figure a way out.
7	7	"Not So Friendly Skies" (Part 1)	David Warry-Smith	Gail Morgan Hickman	March 23, 2009	107
Charlie tricks his mom into thinking he's sick so he can fly to India on the SSJ to attend a gamers costume party with Vas and Ram. En route, the SSJ crashes in a forest where Charlie, now dressed as Aaron Stone, and Stan must fight for their lives against Helix's beasts.
8	8	"Not So Friendly Skies" (Part 2)	David Warry-Smith	Gail Morgan Hickman	March 30, 2009	108
Charlie is saved from Helix's hybrids, and forced to leave Stan behind. Will Charlie disobey direct orders from Hall to come back and save him? The truth about Emma's allegiance is revealed.
9	9	"In Hall We Trust"	Pat Williams	Dan Cross & David Hoge	April 13, 2009	109
Aaron must stop Helix from creating an army of beasts to destroy the world; Jason has a party at home while S.T.A.N. and Emma babysit him. Guest Star: Sarah Gadon as Dr. Martin
10	10	"My Two S.T.A.N.s"	Larry McLean	Dan Cross & David Hoge	April 20, 2009	110
When a man shows up on Charlie's doorstep claiming to be S.T.A.N. from the future, Aaron Stone has to stop Kronis from stealing a time travel formula and enlists both S.T.A.N.'s to foil their plans while Emma tries to figure out where future S.T.A.N. came from.
11	11	"Xero Control"	David Warry-Smith	Sean Cunningham & Marc Dworkin	June 22, 2009	111
Xero captures the world's most feared fighter, World Champion Billy "The Body Bag" Cobb, to program the moves necessary for his combat suit. Aaron Stone is enlisted to rescue Billy Cobb and destroy the combat suit. Guest Star: Chris Jericho as Billy "The Body Bag" Cobb
12	12	"Cloudy with a Chance of Ninjas"	Larry McLean	Sean Cunningham & Marc Dworkin	June 29, 2009	112
Aaron Stone enlists Dark Tamara for help when Zefir and his ninjas steal a weather device from Hall's secret storage facility to destroy a metropolitan city. Aaron and Dark Tamara must learn to work together to save their own lives and the people of Metro City. Meanwhile, Jason takes a photo of what he thinks is a UFO (the SSJ) and S.T.A.N. must find a way to destroy the evidence before his and Aaron's identities are discovered.
13	13	"Hunt Me? Hunt You!"	David Warry-Smith	Dan Cross & David Hoge	July 6, 2009	113
Charlie develops a crush on Tatianna Caine (Meaghan Rath), a girl he rescues while trying to recover stolen radioactive material. After Tatianna reveals a secret about herself and captures Aaron, S.T.A.N. must rescue Aaron. Meanwhile, Emma enlists Jason to help run her campaign for class president.
14	14	"Beastland"	Larry McLean	Sean Cunningham & Marc Dworkin	July 13, 2009	114
Helix's newest half-human mutant stows away on the SSJ in an attempt to destroy Aaron Stone, and after Charlie hurts his arm trying to fight it, it's up to S.T.A.N. and Emma to keep Charlie safe until he can learn how to defeat the mutant on "Hero Rising." Meanwhile, Jason becomes jealous of Charlie's accomplishments and tries to make a name for himself. Note: This episode aired on Disney Channel India on June 12, 2009.
15	15	"Chuck or Charlie"	Larry McLean	Dan Cross & David Hoge	July 20, 2009	115
Charlie quits crime-fighting after he inhales a dangerous toxin during a mission and develops an aggressive egomaniacal personality, "Chuck", that threatens his relationships at home and at school. S.T.A.N. has confirmed tests of the toxin, that if it keeps going, will kill Charlie. In an attempt to save her friend, Emma (as Dark Tamara) with the help of Vas and Ram go to Necros' lab to steal the antidote before it's too late.
16	16	"Mind Games"	Mike McGowan	Gail Morgan Hickman	July 27, 2009	116
Elias Powers, former Hall Industries researcher and creator of the video game, Hero Rising, betrayed Mr. Hall by selling secrets to the Omega Defiance. Now Aaron Stone must get him to reveal the location of a doomsday weapon he’s developed that could destroy the entire city and allow the Omega Defiance to take over the world. Powers challenges Aaron Stone to a high-stakes game of "Hero Rising" and reveals a secret level.
17	17	"My Stakeout with S.T.A.N."	Mike McGowan	Bruce Kalish	August 3, 2009	117
Aaron Stone learns that Mr. Hall originally brought the members of the Omega Defiance together to form a think tank to better mankind. After testing a dangerous DNA-altering serum themselves, the Omega Defiance united against Mr. Hall and drove him into seclusion.
18	18	"Dreamcast"	Larry McLean	Kaita Mpambara	October 7, 2009	119
Aaron Stone (Charlie) is injected with a chip that allows Tranq to enter his dreams and uncover Aaron's ultimate weakness – fear that harm will come to his family. Now S.T.A.N. and Emma must help Aaron remove the chip and defeat Tranq before he takes over his mind. Viewers: 0.3 million
19	19	"S.T.A.N. By Me"	Larry McLean	Sean Cunningham & Marc Dworkin	November 4, 2009	118
S.T.A.N. is replaced by Hunter (Jason Earles), a hip teenage android who helps Aaron Stone battle General Cross, but Aaron completely forgets about S.T.A.N. just because he couldn't fight humans. During a fight, Hunter takes a blast from a laser pistol on the mission and ends up short circuiting, causing him to think that his new mission is to destroy Aaron Stone.
20	20	"Saturday Night Fever"	J. P. Manoux	Dan Cross & David Hoge	November 18, 2009	120
Charlie realises that Emma has never been to a school dance before and decides to take Emma to their school formal and invite Vas and Ram as their guests. Charlie picks them up in the SSJ, but on the way, Hall sends Aaron Stone on a mission to pick up a set of blueprints before Kronis gets to them. When, Kronis captures and holds Vas and Ram hostage, he will only release them in exchange for the blueprints. Aaron Stone must enlist Hall's daughter, Tatianna, to find Kronis, save Vas and Ram and make it to the dance before it's over.
21	21	"Game On"	Larry McLean	Gail Morgan Hickman	November 27, 2009	121
Charlie takes his brother Jason to the 'Hero Rising' tournament for his birthday with Vas, Ram, Emma and S.T.A.N. in tow. At the tournament, Elias Powers locates Aaron Stone and sets out to destroy him. Jason sees Charlie as Aaron Stone for the first time battling it out against the goons and thinks that he did it to impress Jason.

=== Season 2 (2010) ===
No. overall	No. in season	Title	Directed by	Written by	Original release date	Prod. code
22	1	"Damage Control"	Farhad Mann	Bruce Kalish	February 24, 2010	201
A new threat arises when the evil hooded villain, Damaged, frees himself and a bus full of failed experiments, criminals and mutants. Once free, Damaged begins picking off the remaining Omega Defiance members looking for the last vial of intelligence serum. Dr. Necros comes looking to Aaron Stone for protection, but instead lures him into Damaged’s clutches. Meanwhile, Jason is determined to get Charlie a dream job working at the video game and comic store.
23	2	"In The Game of The Father"	Farhad Mann	Dan Cross & David Hoge	February 24, 2010	202
When Charlie (Aaron Stone) discovers that his father worked for the Omega Defiance, the news sends him into a tailspin as he tries to prove that his father wasn’t evil. Charlie follows clues left by his father to track down an intelligence serum, which leads Aaron to a rematch with Damaged over the vial. With new threats to the world, T. Abner Hall enlists Vas and Ram to create a "Hero Rising" expansion pack incorporating the new villains to help Charlie train for his inevitable confrontation with this new evil. Meanwhile, Jason pretends to be Charlie as he begins working at the video game and comic store.
24	3	"Gauntlet, But Not Forgotten"	Larry McLean	Sean Cunningham & Marc Dworkin	March 3, 2010	203
When Jason accidentally sells the Gauntlet, Aaron must confront Shackles without his trusty weapon. Meanwhile, a criminal uses the Gauntlet to rob a bank.
25	4	"Photography"	Larry McLean	Bruce Kalish	March 10, 2010	204
Aaron is photographed while stopping an armored car heist, forcing him to let Mr. Galapagos escape when more cameras are present. Emma helps Aaron by introducing a new stealth mode, so that he can defeat Galapagos before making his worldwide telecast. Meanwhile, Jason, and a classmate who has a crush on him begin to question just who and what S.T.A.N. really is.
26	5	"Face-Off"	Andrew Potter	Dan Cross & David Hoge	March 17, 2010	205
Aaron is detained for questioning when he seemingly kidnaps T. Abner Hall and must convince S.T.A.N. and Dark Tamara that it wasn't him, but the shape-shifting mutant U.
27	6	"My Own Private Superhero"	Andrew Potter	John Tellegen	March 24, 2010	206
Aaron Stone is assigned to guard the daughter of an important foreign dignitary, but her shenanigans get her easily kidnapped by Steeltrap; Aaron must attempt to figure out how to save her, but his plan isn't formed without some unexpected advice. Guest Star: Ashley Leggat as Princess Nikki York
28	7	"Resident Weevil"	Mike McGowan	Sean Cunningham & Marc Dworkin	June 16, 2010	207
While trying to stop Sector 21 escapee Hive (Brittany Gray), Aaron Stone unknowingly transports African Zombie Weevil bugs containing Hive's mind controlling venom back to Eastland. The weevils attach themselves to S.T.A.N. and end up infecting Jason and half of the school. With the venom slowly turning the students into insects, Aaron must get a sample of Hive's venom so Emma can create an antidote before it's too late. Note: This episode premiered in Disney XD India on May 22, 2010 and premiered in Disney XD Latin America on June 5, 2010.
29	8	"Run Aaron, Run"	Mike McGowan	Andrew Black	June 23, 2010	208
Elias Powers escapes from Mr. Hall’s maximum security prison, kidnaps Dark Tamara and challenges Aaron to a high-stakes game to find her. Aaron must decipher the mysterious clues that Powers leaves behind while staying on the move to avoid the satellite lasers targeting him. Meanwhile, Jason is blackmailed by Megan to earn concert tickets in exchange of being her boyfriend. But when Jason refuses her demands, he must now compete with Eugene to earn the tickets.
30	9	"Pack-Man"	Andrew Potter	Dan Cross & David Hoge	June 30, 2010	209
Aaron Stone and Dark Tamara go undercover at a private prep school to find out who is responsible for turning the students into super powered thieves. Meanwhile, Jason finds Emma's top secret weapons book, disguised as her diary and tries every way he can to open it with a little help from Eugene. Guest Star: Nathan Stephenson as Trevor
31	10	"Tracker & Field"	Andrew Potter	Sean Cunningham & Marc Dworkin	July 7, 2010	210
Damaged hires a high-tech bounty hunter named Trace to hunt down Aaron Stone. Meanwhile, Charlie manages to catch the eye of the track coach by using his special shoes, the X5’s in the long jump, much to Emma’s chagrin since he his only supposed to use those shoes on Aaron Stone missions. Guest Star: Shay Mitchell as Irina Webber Note: This episode premiered in Disney XD India on May 30, 2010.
32	11	"Metal Gear Liquid"	Mario Azzopardi	Andrew Black	July 14, 2010	211
Charlie's plans a date with Carrie watching her favorite horror movie. But his plans are thwarted when Hybrot, Damaged's liquid computer that can steal and store memories, sneaks into the house. Charlie must find a way to shut down the Hybrot, get his friends’ memories back, all without revealing his alter ego to Carrie and Jason. Guest Star: Bryn McAuley as Carrie
33	12	"Sparks"	Mario Azzopardi	Dan Cross & David Hoge	July 21, 2010	212
Mr. Galapagos is hired by Damaged to steal a high-powered battery to activate an atom disruptor left by the Omega Defiance to destroy Europe. But when Aaron stops Galapagos in the act, Galapagos is then double-crossed by Damaged and is used as the battery instead. Meanwhile, Charlie buys a new car and invites Irina Webber for a ride, Jason on the other hand invites two other girls to date Charlie on the same night.
34	13	"Mutant Rain" (Part 1)	David Wu	Bruce Kalish	July 30, 2010	213
Charlie loses his first Hero Rising game ever to a new player named Grudge, a teenage boy trained by Elias Powers. Grudge and Powers are working with Damaged to take down Aaron Stone and unleash a virus known as "Mutant Rain", that will turn the entire world into mutants. On his first mission stopping Grudge, Aaron is pushed out of the way by Dark Tamara when Grudge fires a device, leaving her temporarily blind. He then uses the device to infiltrate Hall Industries and release U. Meanwhile, Jason becomes more suspicious of Charlie's behavior, with him finally finding out that Charlie is Aaron Stone. Note: This episode and the following episode premiered on Disney XD India on May 21, 2010.
35	14	"Mutant Rain" (Part 2)	David Wu	Sean Cunningham & Marc Dworkin	July 30, 2010	214
With Jason now knowing about Charlie being Aaron Stone, he insists on helping Aaron defeat Damaged. Aaron defeats Grudge with S.T.A.N. overcoming Asimov's Law taking him down and Aaron removing the Elias' controller chip which gave Grudge his strength and skill. S.T.A.N. then self-destructs because he broke Asimov's Law, leaving only his head intact. Damaged and Elias Powers have now infiltrated the White House holding the President of the United States hostage and having U impersonate him to launch the space craft that will unleash "Mutant Rain" unto the world. Aaron finally arrives, defeating Damaged using his stealth mode and the device that blinded Emma, with a little help from Jason, The President also stops the virus. Elias Powers is also stopped, but not before intercepting codes to a secret room beneath the Oval Office called "The Uriah Chamber" which has an even greater evil. In the end, a new and improved S.T.A.N. is fully assembled, and Mr. Hall finally comes out of the shadows to show his face. They all believe that they have captured the real Elias Powers, but they have not; they captured U. The final seconds of the series show the real Elias entering "The Uriah Chamber".
