= Cassarino =

Cassarino is a Sicilian surname, either derived from the town of Cassaro or from cassaru, "box- or case-maker". Notable people with the surname include:

- Mathias Gallo Cassarino (born 1992), Italian Muay Thai fighter
- Primo Cassarino (born 1956), American mobster
- Stacie Cassarino (born 1975), American poet, educator and editor

== See also ==
- Cassar
- Cassarà
