= WireCo WorldGroup =

American corporation

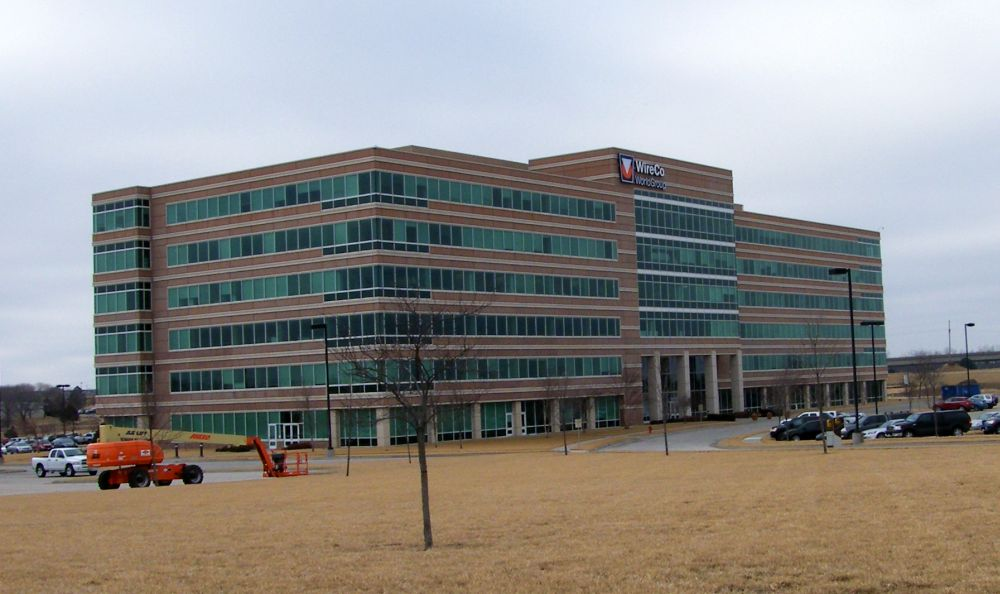
Corporate headquarters at 12200 N. Ambassador Drive on the site of the former Red Crown Tourist Court 2009

WireCo WorldGroup (formerly Wire Rope Corporation of America) is a privately owned company that claims to be the world's largest manufacturer of wire rope.

== History ==
J.P. Barclay Sr. founded the company in 1931 as a spin-off of the New Haven, Connecticut-based Wire Machinery Corporation of America. In 1950 it moved its headquarters to St. Joseph, Missouri where its main operations had been since 1948.

It acquired the wire rope division of A.H. Leschen & Sons of St. Louis, Missouri in 1962; the Armco Steel wire rope division in 1988; the Rochester Corporation wire rope division in 1998; the Broderick Bascom Rope Company and MacWhyte Wire Rope Company of Wisconsin in 1999; the Aceros Camesa in Mexico in 2005; entered into a joint agreement with Wuhan Iron and Steel in China in 2006; Wireline Works of Canada in 2007; CASAR in 2007 and Phillystran in 2009.

In 2002 the company filed for Chapter 11 bankruptcy. KPS Special Situations acquired the company for $53 million in assumed debt and $1.5 million in cash.

Fox Paine & Company bought the company in 2007 Later that year the company moved its headquarters to the former Farmland Industries headquarters on the site of the Red Crown Tourist Court by Kansas City International Airport. The company was renamed Wireco Worldgroup in October 2007 and ownership was transferred to Paine & Partners. In the summer of 2015, the company moved its headquarters to Prairie Village, Kansas. The company sold a majority stake to a Toronto-based private equity fund, Onex Corporation in June 2016. In January 2020, the company appointed Keith White as chief executive officer.
