= Qassar =

Qassar is an Arabic name and a variant of Cassar and Kassar. Qassar may refer to:

- Qassar Khusayfah, group of islets in Bahrain
- Qassar al Qulay`ah, an island of Bahrain
