= Casar =

Casar may refer to:

== Places ==
=== Spain ===
- Casar de Cáceres
- Casar de Palomero
- El Casar
- El Casar de Escalona

=== United States ===
- Casar, North Carolina

== Other uses ==
- CASAR, German wire rope manufacturer, part of WireCo Worldgroup
- El Casar (Madrid Metro)
- Operation Cäsar, part of the German army attack Operation Doppelkopf in World War II

== People with the surname ==
- Amira Casar, French actress
- Greg Casar (born 1989), American politician
- Sandy Casar, French racing cyclist
