= MultiFunding =

- Website type: Banking and Finance
- Available in: English
- Headquarters: Ambler, PA, {{{location_country}}}
- Founders: Ami Kassar (CEO)
- Website: multifunding.com
- Commercial: Yes
- Launched: February 2010

MultiFunding is a national business leverage advisor and brokering firm that helps small- and medium-sized businesses across America find debt financing for their companies. MultiFunding has placed over 700 loans in 47 states. It has financing capabilities in excess of $25 million. In addition to conventional bank loans, MultiFunding provides businesses with alternative loan options such as SBA-guaranteed loans, asset-based loans, equipment loans, real estate loans, and mezzanine loans, among others. MultiFunding was founded by Ami Kassar in 2010. They mostly broker SBA-guaranteed loans and asset-based loans.

== Lending Partners ==
In addition to banks, MultiFunding partners with over 200 alternative lenders to provide businesses with loan options such as SBA-guaranteed loans, asset-based loans, equipment loans, real estate loans, and mezzanine loans, among others.

== Types of Loans Placed ==
MultiFunding mostly brokers SBA-guaranteed loans and asset-based loans. MultiFunding is a strong advocate of securing SBA-guaranteed loans for its clients due to the loans’ competitive pricing and long amortization period. For clients who are rapidly growing, in turnaround situations, or undercapitalized, MultiFunding will typically recommend asset-based loans to utilize the clients’ balance sheets.

== Banking Grades ==
In May 2012, MultiFunding launched Banking Grades, a site that allowed small business owners to search for banks that have a proven commitment to small business lending. Using public data from the Federal Deposit Insurance Corporation (FDIC), Banking Grades compared the amount of a bank's deposits to the number of loans that bank has made to small businesses. In order to receive an A grade, a bank needs to utilize 25 percent or more of its domestic deposits to make small business loans, e.g. loans that are $1,000,000 or less. Banking Grades gave an A grade to over 2,500 banks in the US. The grading methodology and its results received both praise and criticism from academics, small businesses, and banks.

== See also ==
- JOBS Act
