= Jerome Alden =

American playwright and screenwriter

Jerome Alden (March 5, 1921 – May 4, 1997) was an American playwright and screenwriter for television and documentary films. He was born in Portland, Oregon. He graduated from the University of Oregon. He wrote the one-man play Bully, about Theodore Roosevelt, and the book for the musical Teddy & Alice, which was also about the Roosevelt family. Both productions appeared on Broadway. Alden was married to a ballerina, Barbara Gaye, who danced in the original Broadway productions of Annie Get Your Gun and Our Town. They were the parents of opera directors Christopher Alden and David Alden.
