= Aaron Stone =

Live-action, single-camera adventure series

- Promotional poster with Kelly Blatz as Aaron Stone and J. P. Manoux as S.T.A.N.
- Genre: Action-adventure; Science fiction; Superhero
- Created by: Bruce Kalish
- Starring: Kelly Blatz; Tania Gunadi; David Lambert; J. P. Manoux
- Countries of origin: United States; Canada
- Original language: English
- No. of seasons: 2
- No. of episodes: 35 (list of episodes)

Production
- Executive producers: Bruce Kalish; Suzanne French
- Production locations: Toronto, Ontario, Canada
- Editor: Eric Goddard
- Camera setup: Single camera
- Running time: 22 minutes
- Production companies: Shaftesbury Films; Three Hearts Productions

Original release
- Network: Disney XD
- Release: February 13, 2009 – July 30, 2010

Aaron Stone is a science fiction action-adventure television series created by Bruce Kalish. Originally broadcast with the launch of Disney XD on February 13, 2009, it was the first original series to air on the network. It was produced in conjunction with Canadian Shaftesbury Films and filmed in Toronto, Ontario, Canada.

== Premise ==
The series was about a teenager named Charlie Landers (Kelly Blatz) who is enlisted to become the real-life counterpart of his world-renowned avatar Aaron Stone from the fictional video game Hero Rising. The series also starred David Lambert, Tania Gunadi and J. P. Manoux. Unlike most of Disney's live-action shows, Aaron Stone featured a darker tone with a complex storyline.

== Episodes ==
Season	Episodes	Originally released	
Season	Episodes	First released	Last released
1	21	February 13, 2009	November 27, 2009
2	14	February 24, 2010	July 30, 2010

== Cast and characters ==
=== Main ===
- Kelly Blatz as Charlie Landers/Aaron Stone: The teenage protagonist, who assumes the role of his video-game avatar in order to protect his family and the world. His Hero Rising avatar and real-life secret identity is named "Aaron Stone." He is 16 years old at the beginning of the series. He is the best of the best in Hero Rising. His weapons in Hero Rising and in real-life alter ego as Aaron Stone is the Gauntlet, and as said by S.T.A.N., the Gauntlet has the power of ten suns which makes it the most powerful weapon in Hero Rising. He also has a bike which is from the S.S.J. (Super Sonic Jet). In the earlier episodes he had a crush on Emma before finding out she worked for Mr. Hall.
- Tania Gunadi as Emma Lau/Dark Tamara: A nerdy computer-savvy tomboy who is Charlie's next door neighbor. She knows of Charlie's double identity and works for Mr. Hall. She is very proficient in hacking and stealth tactics. She created most of Charlie's weapons and is a 2nd degree weapon specialist. She, like Charlie, has an alter-ego: her avatar, Dark Tamara. It is also revealed that her first kiss was with Jason, in episode "Game On" to hide the secret of S.T.A.N. being an android when his hand fell off.
- David Lambert as Jason Landers/Terminus Mag: Charlie's 14-year-old younger brother, who, like Charlie, is an enthusiastic Internet-game player. His gaming skills are seriously lacking. His avatar is Terminus Mag, a giant golden robot who is his brother's ally. He has a crush on Emma but she doesn't return his feelings. In Run Aaron, Run, it is hinted that he might be starting to like Megan. Jason has no idea his brother Charlie is a secret real-life world crime-fighting hero: Aaron Stone, until the series finale that he found out about Charlie's alter ego. In the series finale, he was a big help to his brother by finding Damaged's weakness and by helping Aaron defeat him and presumably becomes part of Aaron's team permanently afterwards. He is one of the first people to see T. Abner Hall's face. His first kiss was with Emma, in episode "Game On".
- J. P. Manoux as S.T.A.N.: Charlie's android sidekick. His name is said to be an acronym of "Sentient Tactical Assisting Neo-human". Stan is ruled by Asimov's Laws of Robotics: He must not harm humans or allow humans to be harmed, and he must obey orders. He can't harm opponents that are part human, like mutants and cyborgs. Due to the Three Laws, Stan is almost useless in a fight. Despite this he is a very powerful fighter, but can only fight non-human opponents, like Hunter and Xero's robots. Stan's lock-down mode activates whenever his circuits are being tampered turning him into traveling cargo. It is revealed in "Resident Weevil" that he has been recording Charlie's adventures and adding up his progress into "points". As a cover-up, Stan is a teacher at Charlie and Jason's school. In episode "Mutant Rain Part 2", Stan is able to bypass Asimov's Laws even though he knows it will destroy him in order to save Aaron's life. He blasts Grudge down as he's about to finish Aaron off, allowing Aaron to free Grudge from Elias Powers control, but causing Stan to self-destruct, leaving only his head intact. Vas and Ram are able to reactivate his head and he is able to track down Aaron and Jason uses him to defeat Powers by hitting Powers in the head with Stan's head (unknown to them, U later frees and replaces Powers). After the adventure is over, Hall rebuilds him, making him new and improved. While S.T.A.N. still looks the same, Hall says he is now able to do much more.

=== Recurring ===
- Martin Roach as T. Abner Hall: the President of HALL Industries and maker of the game, Hero Rising. He is Charlie's mentor and Stan's creator. It was his idea to help the world by creating a think-tank, which led to the creation of the intelligence serum that turned the Omega Defiance into villains bent on destruction. In Hall's defense, he told them not to take the serum as it wasn't finished testing. He refused the request from the group to take his vial of the serum and instead opts to use all of Hall Industries resources to help bring down the Omega Defiance and undo the damage the serum has caused. Mr. Hall is always seen with his face hidden in the shadows. He does this on purpose, as anyone who sees his face would become a target of the Omega Defiance. Mr. Hall's face can sometimes be vaguely made out, but never completely seen, even in flashbacks. Hall reveals his face in episode "Mutant Rain (Part 2)" to Aaron's team as they have earned his full trust.
- Vasanth Saranga as Vas Mehta/Vasuvius: The brother of Ramdas. He is from Kolkata, India. Vas is the nerdier and more traditional of the two brothers. He and his brother join Aaron's team and in the series finale are among those who Hall finally reveal his face to.
- Jesse Rath as Ramdas "Ram" Mehta/Lethal Lotus: The brother of Vas. Like his brother, he is also from Kolkata, India. Ram often wears a mechanical helmet and is slightly more cool than his brother. He and his brother join Aaron's team and in the series finale are among those who Hall finally reveal his face to.
- Rob Ramsay as Percy Budnick: A large bully who has a crush on Emma and is always out to get Jason. Jason often provokes Budnick. Percy is also a member of the Eastland High wrestling team.
- Shauna MacDonald as Amanda Landers (season 1): Charlie & Jason's mother & new employee of HALL Industries.
- Italia Ricci as Chase Ravenwood (season 1): Charlie's classmate and love interest. She is secretly obsessed with comic books and finds a connection with Charlie when they find out they both enjoy the "Lost Fighter" series of comics. Chase moved to California in "Saturday Fight Fever" to much of Charlie's disappointment.
- Daniel DeSanto as Harrison Marshall (season 1): Eastland High's resident nitwit, Harrison often pesters Charlie, Emma and Jason. In the episode, "Tracker and Field", he is shown to have a record on the long jump.
- Meaghan Rath as Tatianna Caine Hall (season 1): Mr. Hall's daughter who works for the Omega Defiance. She later helped Aaron fight off Kronis to save Vas and Ram and later accompanied him to his school dance, in which the two bonded. It is shown that Aaron has not given up on her, and still sees good in her, trusting her fully in "Saturday Fight Fever". It is unknown if she has defected to the good side, but known that she is kept closely with her father.
- Doug Murray as Daniel Landers (season 2): Charlie & Jason's father
- Frank Cox-O'Connell as Adolf (season 2): He works at the Neverendings comic store and controls the cash register. Eugene once caught Jason impersonating Charlie's avatar, Aaron Stone when Terminus Mag (who Charlie was using to get revenge) shot Aaron Stone.
- Zoë Belkin as Megan (season 2): A girl who has a crush on Jason.
- Meghan Heffern as Jo (season 2): The manager of Neverending Comics

=== Villains ===
- Malcolm Travis as Elias Powers: A former Hall Industries researcher & the real creator of the Hero Rising video game. A programming genius, he designed the game to be unbeatable. He is shown to enjoy games, especially mind games. In finding out the truth about the Omega Defiance, he fell out with Mr. Hall and joined the seven. He turned himself into a cyborg, by attaching a device in himself that is linked to his brain, making him smarter and unable to feel pain. He escaped in the episode "Mind Games" but was recaptured in the season 1 finale. He broke out of Hall's prison in the episode "Run Aaron, Run" and try to get revenge on Aaron in the same episode. He then made an alliance with Damaged in "Mutant Rain (Part 1)", the series finale, in which he trained a young man name "Grudge" to help him with his plan. Powers was seemly captured by Emma, only to turn out to be (unknown to the heroes) U in disguise. The real Elias Powers is last seen going to the "Uriah Chamber", a mysterious chamber under the White House that is said to hold a great and terrible power. Powers is the longest running antagonist of the series.

==== Omega Defiance ====
The Omega Defiance is an evil group composed of the seven most brilliant minds on the planet, and whom Aaron Stone has to defeat. The group was originally assembled by T. Abner Hall to form a think-tank for the sole purpose of bettering mankind. The seven created a serum that genetically alters DNA, enabling the subject to increase their intelligence tenfold. Impatient and eager to test it, they took the serum themselves. However, the serum was flawed, and instead of making them smarter, it twisted their minds and made them more aggressive. They began to believe that mankind isn't worth bettering, so they betrayed Hall, and now desire to conquer the world and make things their way, with them in charge. They are all presumably defeated by Damaged, a mutant escapee from the research lab called Sector 21, in season 2, except for Dr. Necros who is taken prisoner.

- Anthony J. Mifsud as Dr. Necros: A chemist who specializes in creating dangerous serums and toxins. His name is derived from a Greek term meaning "death". It is unknown what became of Dr. Necros after Damaged's capture.
- Steven Yaffee as Xero: A young corporate executive who is skilled in handling computers, but incapable of adequate social relations. Xero is an owner of Xero Industries. He is known for fighting through the use of machines and technology, rather than taking on Aaron face-to-face. Due to his social awkwardness, he often speaks in text language (ex. LOL, Stone!). He seems to be the youngest member of the Omega Defiance. His name is probably a reference to the binary code, zero being one of the binary digits.
- Xhemi Agaj as Helix: A geneticist who specializes in Genetic Mutations, mixing animal and human species together. He has an Albanian accent. His name comes from the structure of DNA, which is a double-helix.
- Tom McCamus as Zefir: A meteorologist once focused on using his genius to create devices to help change the world. After turning evil, his focus is to create devastating weapons that use weather as part of the destruction (e.g. Lightning Laser). He is known to employ a team of Ninjas (led by head Ninja "Kwan") to help carry out his doings. His name is derived from the Greek god of the West Wind, Zephyr.
- Sarain Boylan as Cerebella: A neurologist specializing in Mind Control. Her name is derived from a region of the brain called the cerebellum, which is responsible for sensory perception, coordination and motor control.
- Michael Copeman as General Cross: A general who specializes in weaponry and all things military. He has a large facial scar and is known to wear army fatigues and a beret. The name Cross is probably a reference to the Latin, crux, which figuratively means torture. He was confirmed as destroyed in "Damage Control"
- Kent Staines as Kronis: A scientist specializing in time travel. His name refers to Kronos, the Greek titan of time.

==== Sector 21 ====
The Sector 21 escapees are a group of people who were captured by the Omega Defiance and experimented on, transforming them into mutants with amazing powers and who serve as the main antagonists for season 2. They were housed in a secret lab called Sector 21. They wish to take revenge on all humans for the acts of cruelty done to them at the hands of the Omega Defiance. Aaron captured them one by one. By the end of season 2, all the Mutants are captured except Ben Slivers, who briefly worked with Elias Powers and later found redemption.

- Greg Bryk as Damaged: A mutant reject from the Omega Defiance's experiments from Sector 21. He escapes and leads his fellow mutants against the Defiance for their cruelty and becomes an antagonist to Charlie/Aaron Stone. He wears a tattered goblin mask to cover his disfigured face and he has telekinetic powers but can't move what he can't see. He is responsible for the presumed destruction of the Omega Defiance and the capture of Dr. Necros. He is captured in the series finale by Aaron and Jason.
- Scott Yaphe as Ben Slivers: A timid mutant who was part of an experiment involving rats. He is easily startled and can contort himself to fit through small spaces. Charlie questioned him about his father's connection to the Omega Defiance. He is also very afraid of Damaged as he ran screaming after S.T.A.N. mentioned him. He makes a brief appearance in "Mutant Rain (Part 1)" helping Aaron capture Shackles, but is revealed to be working for Elias Powers.
- Matthew G. Taylor as Shackles: A Russian mutant who had strength experiments performed on him by the Defiance. By implanting animal muscles into his body, this turns him into an uncontrollable monster with freakish strength, and also uses the cuffs and chains on his wrists, which are made of unbreakable titanium and were originally used to keep him under control, as weapons. Shackles is captured by Aaron in "Mutant Rain (Part 1)".
- Jordan Prentice as Mr. Galapagos: A mutant little person who can control electricity. Galapagos' body generates raw electromagnetic energy, which he can harness for various purposes, the most common being electric blasts. He has to remain in a specialized containment unit in order to neutralize his powers. When outside the containment unit, he uncontrollably projects electricity, destroying anything he comes into contact with. He managed to acquire a prototype ion resistant suit, which allowed him to be able to leave his containment unit and use his powers only when the suit is removed. Unlike the other Sector 21 mutants, he does not follow Damaged, and instead of destroying the planet, he aims to rule it. He tried to use his powers to establish himself as ruler of Earth, but Aaron stopped him and damaged his suit, confining him to his containment unit once more. Galapagos then agreed to join up with Damaged in return for revenge on Aaron Stone. In "Sparks" it is revealed he was once a scientist working on the forced fusion battery but was kidnapped by the Omega Defiance and turned into a mutant. Damaged betrayed him in "Sparks", thus Galapagos vowed to get revenge on Damaged.
- Brittany Gray as Hive: A mutant (and the only female one shown) who has control over insects. She was the result of an experiment by Helix, who fused her with insect DNA. She also possesses the abilities of various insects, such as an incredible leaping ability, acidic spit, and the ability to launch her fingernails as barbed stingers. Her body is filled with a powerful venom that can transform people into insect creatures like her, which she can then command using an ultrasonic signal. In earlier stages her victims act like mindless zombies. She is the second mutant to be captured by Aaron. She is captured in "Resident Weevil"
- Marqus Bobesich as Steeltrap: A mutant criminal who fixed a zipper across his mouth to keep it closed in order to control his power. He was experimented on by General Cross to be a prototype for a soldier who could generate his own force field. He was pumped full of plasma ions through his mouth which allows him create a plasma force field around his body making him impervious to any damage, but the experiment also severely twisted his mind. When his mouth is closed, he is also able to project the ions from his body as a plasma heat wave. His only weakness is that when his mouth is opened, the plasma ions in his body escape and render him powerless. Another weakness is that after he fires three heat waves, his shield powers down and needs ten seconds to recharge which makes him temporarily vulnerable to physical attacks, but laser fire just makes his shield reenergize much quicker. He is the first mutant to be captured by Aaron. He is captured in "My Own Private Superhero"
- Paul Amos as U: A disfigured Australian mutant who possesses the power to shape-shift. All he needs to do is look into someone's face, and his molecules can recreate the person's image, voice, and clothing. His body can also mimic inanimate objects as well (e.g. when he had his hands mimic a branding iron; after he got shot with a laser, he could mimic the laser's heat). Not much is known about his past, he has stated that he had a life before the Defiance experimented on him and that he was an Olympic athlete, which is shown when he is able to evenly fight Aaron. He impersonated Aaron and kidnapped T. Abner Hall, but Aaron managed to rescue him. U is the third mutant to be captured by Aaron. He is captured in the episode "Pack-Man". He escapes in the series finale and helps Damaged and Elias Powers with their plans. U is captured in the series finale, but disguised as Elias Powers, while the real Elias Powers goes into the "Uriah Chamber".

== Production ==
Production for the first season ran from June 2, to December 19, 2008. The first season aired on Disney XD from February 13, to November 27, 2009. On May 5, 2009, Disney announced that the show had been renewed for a second season. Kelly Blatz confirmed via Twitter account that production for the second season began on June 22, 2009.

On November 11, 2009, in a live Ustream chat with J. P. Manoux, Tania Gunadi and Bruce Kalish, it was announced that Aaron Stone would not be renewed for a third season, with the second season being its last. The given reason was that Disney XD made the decision to put more emphasis on live-action programming that is primarily comedy-based. This announcement was made before season one concluded in the United States. A total of 14 episodes were produced for the second season premiering on February 24, 2010. The last remaining 8 episodes began airing on June 16 and concluded on July 30, 2010. As of 2015, Disney XD discontinued airing reruns of Aaron Stone in the United States.

=== Emma's designs ===
#s	List 1	List 2	List 3	List 4
1	Sonic Pulsator 3000	Detonation	Locator	Communication Device
2	Laser Guns	Climbing Spike	Laser Ray black sunglasses	Blaster
3	Video Camera Parking Sensor	Tranq Blaster	Electro Depleter	Jet Pack
4	Super glue stray	Antidote Stray	Emma's top secret weapon & gadgets diary	

== Other appearances ==
In the 2015 Disney Channel Original Movie, Descendants, Carlos, played by Cameron Boyce, was seen playing "Hero Rising" as the Aaron Stone character.

In an episode of Good Luck Charlie, Gabe and P.J. can be seen playing a video game also containing footage from Hero Rising.
