= The Toxic Avenger (musical) =

- Music: David Bryan
- Lyrics: Joe DiPietro; David Bryan
- Book: Joe DiPietro
- Basis: The Toxic Avenger by Lloyd Kaufman
- Productions: 2008 New Brunswick; 2009 Off-Broadway; 2009 Toronto; 2010 US Tour; 2012 Houston; 2013 Oahu; 2015 Coral Gables; 2016 Melbourne; 2016 Off-West End; 2016 Los Angeles; 2016 Pittsburgh; 2017 West End
- Awards: Outer Critics Circle Award for Best New Off-Broadway Musical

The Toxic Avenger is a 2008 rock musical based on the 1984 film of the same name. The book of the musical was written by Joe DiPietro, its music by David Bryan, and both wrote the lyrics. It is a comical take on a number of themes, including superhero stories, pollution, disability, politics, and the idea that New Jersey is inferior to other places. Since its first showing in 2008, it has been performed around the world through at least 2017.

== Productions ==
The musical was first produced under the direction of John Rando at George Street Playhouse in New Brunswick, New Jersey and opened after previews officially on October 10, 2008. The title role of Melvin Ferd the Third/The Toxic Avenger went to Nick Cordero. Audra Blaser played Sarah, and Nancy Opel played Mayor Babs Belgoody and Ma Ferd. It received a generally favorable press.

The New York City premiere opened at New World Stages on April 6, 2009. The New York Times called the production "exuberantly silly", while New York Post called it "hilariously funny". The show opening night cast included Sara Chase, Nick Cordero, Demond Green, Matthew Saldivar and Nancy Opel. Erin Leigh Peck and Nicholas Rodriguez are the original understudies. The musical closed on January 2, 2010 after over 300 performances, in which the production left for a tour across the United States.

Time–Life and the cast recorded and released the Original Cast Recording on April 6 in the New World Venue and nationwide on May 5, 2009.

Under Rando's direction, a Toronto production of the musical premiered on October 30 2009 at the Danforth Music Hall. The show was produced by Dancap Productions. It starred Evan Alexander Smith as Toxie, Brittany Gray as Sarah, Louise Pitre as Mayor Babs Belgoody and Ma Ferd, Jamie McKnight as White Dude, and Daren A. Herbert as Black Dude. Peter Deiwick was the male swing and Cara Leslie was the female swing.

A production opened in January 2012 at the Alley Theatre in Houston, Texas. The cast included Constantine Maroulis, Nancy Opel and Mara Davi.

The show was brought to Oahu, Hawaii where it was shown at Manoa Valley Theater in September 2013. It was extended for two weeks into October 2013.

An Australian production was held in April 2016 in Melbourne, Victoria.

The first production in Europe opened at the Southwark Playhouse in London; directed by Benji Sperring with Costumes and Sets by Mike Lees. The production began in April 2016 for a limited run of 5 weeks. The production gained universal 5 star reviews and multiple awards nominations for its actors and design. The production played at the Edinburgh Fringe Festival ahead of a transfer to the Arts Theatre in the West End, where it opened on October 2, 2017 following previews from September 28. It played a limited run until December 3. The production on the West End starred Mark Anderson as Toxie, Emma Salvo as Sarah, Natalie Hope as Mayor Babs Belgoody and Ma Ferd, Oscar Conlon-Morrey as White Dude, and Ché Francis as Black Dude. Peter Bindloss was the male swing and Sophia Lewis was the female swing with the same creative team.

At the Hollywood Fringe Festival in Los Angeles, the musical was produced by Good People Theater Company.

In 2018, a film of The Toxic Avenger musical was released by BroadwayHD.

== Plot ==
Lights up on the most traditional of all musical settings - a toxic waste dump off the New Jersey Turnpike. As the citizens of Tromaville cry for help ("Who Will Save New Jersey?") Melvin Ferd the Third, an aspiring earth scientist, vows to clean up the state. Everyone is skeptical.

At the Tromaville Library, Melvin visits Sarah, the town's beautiful, blind librarian. Barely able to contain his unrequited love, Melvin informs her that horrible vats of toxic goo have appeared all over Tromaville and he is determined to find out who's responsible and put a stop to them. Sarah, turned on by his environmental heroism, asks to feel his face. He reluctantly allows her and Sarah quickly realizes that she is not attracted to him one bit. She points him to the official town records, where Melvin makes a shocking discovery. At Tromaville City Hall, Mayor Babs Belgoody expresses her unbridled ambition to become New Jersey's governor ("Jersey Girl"). But Melvin enters with evidence that will defer her dream - he has discovered that the kick-back happy Mayor is the person who is allowing Tromaville to be overrun by toxic waste. Thinking quick, the Mayor promises to change her evil ways and make Melvin her deputy. When Melvin leaves, she immediately orders her two goons, Sluggo and Bozo, to "Get the Geek".

The goons toss Melvin into a drum of toxic waste, leaving him for dead. In an incredible coincidence, Sarah happens to walk by on her way home. Never ones to pass up the opportunity to sexually harass someone, the goons taunt Sarah, who immediately faints. As she does, a large, terrifying roar shakes the air. And up from the smoking green slime emerges the Toxic Avenger, a large, green mutant with a hideously deformed face and a ripped, superhero body. The Toxic Avenger sees the unconscious Sarah and informs the goons that they're in deep trouble ("Kick Your Ass"). He then proceeds to rip them to shreds. The Toxic Avenger scoops Sarah up and carries her off to her pattern-challenged apartment. When she awakens, the mutant confesses that he's toxic. She assumes that that's a French name and she decided to nickname him Toxie. He is delighted until she asks to touch his face. He refuses, stating that he has horrible acne. Sarah then invites him back for brunch tomorrow, and after he leaves she phones her two best friends to brag about her smokin' hunk of a hero ("My Big French Boyfriend").

In the streets of Tromaville, Toxie pines for his love ("Thank God She's Blind"). When Toxie arrives home, Ma Ferd comes upon her transformed son and expresses her lifelong disappointment in him. Desperate for help, he goes to their primary care HMO physician ("Big Green Freak"), who sends him to Tromaville's leading ethical mad-scientist, Professor Ken, who reveals that the only thing that can kill Toxie is household bleach. Back in her apartment, Sarah is dictating a fantastic idea for a best- selling memoir ("Choose Me, Oprah!"). Toxie visits but tells her he can't stay long because he's on a mission to single-handedly remove every vile vat of toxic waste from Tromaville. As Sarah tries to seduce Toxie, he confesses that he's never actually been on a date with a girl. Turned on by his virginity, Sarah joins Toxie in expressing their newfound feelings ("Hot Toxic Love").

Down at the Tromaville docks, the Mayor supervises the unloading of a huge shipment of toxic waste. But Toxie foils her plan, and he reveals that he's actually Melvin Ferd the Third. Not one to let a superhero mutant freak get the better of her, the Mayor vows to destroy him. But to her dismay, Toxie quickly becomes a folk hero to the people of Tromaville ("The Legend of the Toxic Avenger"). The Mayor barges into Professor Ken's lab, insisting he tell her how to kill the mutant. Professor Ken refuses, but the Mayor overwhelms him with her incredible sex appeal ("Evil is Hot"). At Tromaville Beauty Salon, Melvin's beleaguered mother is informed by her two hairdressers - Lorenzo and Lamas - that her childhood enemy, none other than the Mayor, is coming to see her. Determined to find the whereabouts of Melvin, the Mayor corners Ma and the two women brawl ("Bitch/Slut/Liar/Whore"). Back at her apartment, Sarah grows increasingly frustrated with her fruitless attempts to seduce Toxie. But with the Mayor closing in, Toxie tells Sarah he must leave Tromaville. Before he goes, he reveals his true identity. Sarah is flabbergasted but vows to love him anyway - that is until she touches his face, at which point she tearfully suggests that they both start seeing other handicapped people. Hurt and angry, Toxie takes to the street ("Everybody Dies!") and brutally kills an adorable senior citizen, Edna Ferbert. But the heartbroken Toxie cannot sustain the beast within ("You Tore My Heart Out"). At the library, Ma Ferd finds Sarah crying, but Ma convinces the sobbing librarian that her mutant son isn't that much different from other men. In an inspiring and beautiful moment of human understanding, they reflect of how "All Men Are Freaks".

On the steps of City Hall, the Mayor rallies both citizens of Tromaville to form a drunken, frenzied lynch mob. The chase ensues, encompassing everyone in Tromaville, until Toxie is cornered. But just as the Mayor is about to extinguish him with bleach, Sarah rushes in and fires several gunshots, every one of them missing the Mayor. Fortunately, one shot eventually hits the Mayor, but not before Toxie has been hit with bleach. Toxie crumples and dies in Sarah's arms. As the librarian weeps, Ma Ferd rushes in with the one thing that can save him- the most vile, disgusting liquid on Earth- a glass of water from the Hudson River. As Tromaville reacts with unmitigated joy, Toxie comes to and vows to kill all polluters and end global warming. And one year later on election night, Ma Ferd introduces the new first family of New Jersey- Governor Toxie Ferd the Third, his beautiful wife Sarah, and their adorable blind, green baby, Toxie Jr. All look ahead to a glorious future for their beloved state ("A Brand New Day in New Jersey").

== Musical numbers ==
- "Who Will Save New Jersey?" – Melvin and Company
- "Jersey Girl" – Mayor and Waste Management Executives
- "Get the Geek" – Mayor, Sluggo and Bozo
- "Kick Your Ass" – Toxie
- "My Big French Boyfriend" – Sarah, Shinequa and Diane
- "Thank God She's Blind" – Toxie
- "Disappointment" – Ma Ferd, Professor Ken, Toxie,
- "Choose Me, Oprah!" – Sarah, Shinequa and Diane
- "Hot Toxic Love" – Toxie and Sarah
- "The Legend of the Toxic Avenger" – Folk Singer and Toxie
- "Evil is Hot" – Mayor and Professor Ken
- "Bitch/Slut/Liar/Whore" – Mayor and Ma Ferd
- "Everybody Dies!" – Toxie
- "You Tore My Heart Out" – Toxie
- "All Men Are Freaks" – Ma Ferd, Sarah, Shinequa and Diane
- "The Chase" – Company
- "Hot Toxic Love" (Reprise) – Sarah
- "A Brand New Day in New Jersey" – Toxie, Sarah and Company

== Awards and nominations ==
=== Off-Broadway production ===
Year	Award Ceremony	Category	Nominee	Result
2009	Drama League Awards	Distinguished Production of a Musical	David Bryan and Joe DiPietro	Nominated
2009	Drama League Awards	Distinguished Performance	Nancy Opel	Nominated
2009	Outer Critics Circle Awards	Outstanding New Off-Broadway Musical		Won
2009	Outer Critics Circle Awards	Outstanding Actress in a Musical	Nancy Opel	Nominated
2009	Drama Desk Awards	Outstanding Book of a Musical	Joe DiPietro	Nominated
2009	Drama Desk Awards	Outstanding Featured Actor in a Musical	Demond Green	Nominated
2009	Drama Desk Awards	Outstanding Featured Actress in a Musical	Nancy Opel	Nominated
2009	Henry Hewes Design Awards	Scenic Design	Beowulf Boritt	Nominated
2009	Henry Hewes Design Awards	Costume Design	David C. Woolard	Nominated
2010	Lucille Lortel Awards	Outstanding Musical		Nominated
2010	Lucille Lortel Awards	Outstanding Featured Actress	Nancy Opel	Nominated
2010	Lucille Lortel Awards	Outstanding Choreographer	Wendy Seyb	Nominated
2010	Lucille Lortel Awards	Outstanding Sound Design	Kurt Fischer	Nominated

=== Toronto production ===
Year	Award Ceremony	Category	Nominee	Result
2010	Dora Mavor Moore Awards	Outstanding Production of a Musical		Nominated
2010	Dora Mavor Moore Awards	Outstanding Performance by a Male in a Principal Role – Musical	Daren A. Herbert	Nominated
2010	Dora Mavor Moore Awards	Outstanding Performance by a Male in a Principal Role – Musical	Evan Smith	Nominated
2010	Dora Mavor Moore Awards	Outstanding Performance by a Female in a Principal Role – Musical	Louise Pitre	Won
2010	Dora Mavor Moore Awards	Outstanding Choreography in a Play or Musical	Wendy Seyb	Nominated

=== Coral Gables production ===
Year	Award Ceremony	Category	Nominee	Result
2015	Carbonell Awards	Best Musical Supporting Actress	Laura Hodos	Nominated

=== Off-West End production ===
Year	Award Ceremony	Category	Nominee	Result
2016	Offie	Best Musical Production		Nominated
2016	Offie	Best Director	Benji Sperring	Nominated
2016	Offie	Best Male Performance	Mark Anderson	Nominated
2016	Offie	Best Female Performance	Hannah Glover	Nominated
2016	Offie	Best Male Performance in a Supporting Role	Ashley Samuels	Nominated
2016	Offie	Best Male Performance in a Supporting Role	Marc Pickering	Nominated
2016	Offie	Best Costume Designer	Mike Lees	Nominated
