= Cassar =

Cassar (Maltese pronunciation: [kɐˈsːɐːr]) is a Maltese surname, common both in Malta and the wider Maltese diaspora. It is considered part of the 14 most numerous surnames in Malta.

== Origin ==
According to Maltese linguist Mario Cassar, the surname is of Arabic origin, and derives from the Muslim period of Malta. It is proposed that the meaning comes from qaṣr (Arabic: قَصْر, lit. 'palace' or 'castle'). The Sicilian word càssaru, which is descendant of qaṣr and has a similar meaning, is a latinisation which closely resembles "Cassar".

An alternative Arabic origin is from ḥaṣṣār (Arabic: حَصَّار, lit. 'mat-maker'). The Arabic voiceless pharyngeal fricative (ḥ) evolved into a voiceless velar plosive ([k]) through spoken Sicilian Arabic in rural locations, resulting in the modern pronunciation. This "Sicilianisation" can also be seen in other Maltese surnames of Arabic origin, and likely occurred during the 14th and 15th centuries when Maltese Muslims were forced to latinise their surnames during the Norman Occupation.

There are also various other proposed origins of the surname.:

- It may be traced back to the Kingdom of the Two Sicilies, incorporating the island of Sicily itself, the area around Naples, and the southern part of the Italian Peninsula. The surname Cassar may have derived from the given name Cesare, and further back from the Roman family name Caesar. In Classical antiquity, the name Caesar was associated by folk etymology with the Latin word caesaries (meaning 'head of hair'). The Maltese Cassar coat of arms has the Latin word SPES (meaning 'hope') inscribed on it.
- It may also derive from a fairly common surname in Italy and Sicily: Cassarà, or Cassarino, possibly from a nickname cassaio meaning 'producer of cases'. However these surnames may also be derived from the given name Cesare or Caesar.

== Notable people ==
The most important representatives of the family are the Cassar Desain, marchese de Sain in Malta and the Cassar Torregiani, one of the richest families in 19th century Malta. Other notable people with the name include:

- Aidan Cassar (born 1999), Maltese singer-songwriter
- Anthony Cassar (born 1996), American wrestler
- Antoine Cassar (born 1978), Maltese poet
- Antonio Cassar-Torreggiani (1882–1959), Maltese businessman
- Austin Cassar-Torreggiani (1915–1978), Maltese sprinter
- Brian Cassar (1936–2022), British singer and guitarist
- Eleanor Cassar (born 1982), Maltese singer
- Girolamo Cassar (c. 1520–c. 1592), Maltese architect who designed many buildings in Valletta
- Georgina Cassar (born 1993), Gibraltarian rhythmic gymnast
- Harrison Cassar (born 1997), Australian judoka
- Ian Cassar (born 1966), known as Req, British DJ, record producer and graffiti artist
- Jack Cassar (born 1997), Canadian football player
- Jeff Cassar (born 1974), American football coach and former goalkeeper
- Jem Cassar-Daley (born 2001), Australian singer-songwriter
- Jennifer Cassar (1951–2018), Trinidadian activist and civil servant
- Joe Cassar (born 1966), Maltese politician
- Jon Cassar (born 1958), Maltese-Canadian television director and producer
- Joseph Cassar (diplomat) (1947–2018), Maltese diplomat
- Joseph Cassar (politician) (1918–2001), Maltese politician
- Liana Cassar, American politician
- Matthew Cassar (born 1972), Australian cricketer
- Saverio Cassar (1746–1805), Maltese priest and patriot
- Troy Cassar-Daley (born 1969), Australian singer-songwriter
- Vittorio Cassar (c. 1550–c. 1609), Maltese architect and military engineer

== See also ==
- Cassaro (disambiguation)
- Kassar
- Qassar (disambiguation)
