= Teddy & Alice =

- Logo
- Music: John Philip Sousa; Richard Kapp
- Lyrics: Hal Hackady
- Book: Jerome Alden
- Basis: Fictionalized account of the relationship between Teddy Roosevelt and his daughter, Alice
- Productions: 1987 Broadway

Teddy & Alice is a musical with a book by Jerome Alden, lyrics by Hal Hackady, and music adapted from the work of John Philip Sousa, with some new songs by Richard Kapp. In its very early stages, Alan Jay Lerner contributed material before he died.

The patriotic spectacle focuses on President Theodore Roosevelt's relationship with his feisty daughter during his reign in the White House. Stubbornly independent, Alice smokes, dresses provocatively, and speaks her mind about foreign policy issues in an era when modest young ladies are seen and not heard. Complications ensue when she begins a romantic relationship with considerably older Congressman Nicholas Longworth.

Henry Cabot Lodge, Elihu Root, J. P. Morgan, Ida Tarbell, William Howard Taft, Samuel Gompers, and Franklin and Eleanor Roosevelt are among the historical figures who make an appearance.

== Production ==
After eleven previews, the Broadway production, directed by John Driver and choreographed by Donald Saddler, opened on November 12, 1987 at the Minskoff Theatre, where it ran for 77 performances. The cast included Len Cariou, Beth Fowler, Ron Raines, Nancy Opel, and Karen Ziemba.

== Songs ==
Act I

- The Thunderer
- This House
- But Not Right Now
- She's Got to Go
- The Fourth of July
- Charge
- Battlelines
- The Coming-Out Party Dance
- Leg o' Mutton
- Not Love
- Her Father's Daughter
- Perfect for Each Other
- He's Got to Go
- Wave the Flag

Act II

- The Fourth of July (Reprise)
- Nothing to Lose
- Election Eve
- Perfect for Each Other (Reprise)
- Can I Let Her Go?
- Private Thoughts
- This House (Reprise)

== Reception ==
Teddy & Alice suggested Roosevelt's problems with his daughter Alice stemmed from an obsession with his late first wife. Neither the psychoanalysis nor the many familiar Sousa tunes combined with new lyrics scored with the critics or audiences. Frank Rich in The New York Times compared it to "a halftime show at a high-school football game" and chastised the producers for using Alan Jay Lerner's name: "If the show's creators had any respect for the dead, they would not give the defenseless Mr. Lerner partial artistic 'credit'" for such a bad show.
