= Curvy Widow =

- ''The Musical Comedy''
- Off-Broadway official artwork
- Music: Drew Brody
- Lyrics: Drew Brody
- Book: Bobby Goldman
- Premiere: August 3rd, 2017: Westside Theatre, New York City
- Productions: 2016 North Carolina 2017 Off-Broadway

Curvy Widow is a 2016 musical comedy based on a true story with music and lyrics by Drew Brody and a book by Bobby Goldman.

== Production ==
The musical is directed by Peter Flynn, with choreography by Marcos Santana.

=== North Carolina production ===
The world premiere of Drew Brody and Bobby Goldman's Curvy Widow the Musical opened at North Carolina Stage Company in November 2016.

=== George Street Playhouse Production ===
Prior to their Off-Broadway debut, the musical opened at George Street Playhouse early May 2017 in New Brunswick, New Jersey.

=== Off-Broadway production ===
The musical started previews in July 2017 and officially opened Off-Broadway in August 2017 at Westside Theatre.

== Songs ==
- "Under Control" - Bobby, Jim, and Ensemble
- "Turn the Page" - Bobby
- "White Box Loft" - Shrink, Bobby, and Ensemble
- "Age Height Weight" - Bobby
- "Curvy Widow" - Bobby
- "A New Hand" - Bobby and Mort
- "It's Not a Match" - Bobby, Heidi, Caroline, Joan and the Men
- "Curvy Widow (reprise)" - Bobby
- "Log On, Get Off" - Ensemble
- "The Rules for Whittling Down" - Bobby
- "Gynecologist Tango" - Bobby, Caroline, Heidi, and Ensemble
- "Looking For" - The Men
- "Lying on the Bathroom Floor" - Bobby
- "Looking For (reprise)" - The Men
- "The One" - Joan, Caroline, and Heidi
- "What More Do You Need?" - Per Se and Bobby
- "Why Stop Here?" - Bobby and Ensemble
- "In Her Sites" - Ensemble and Bobby

== Original casts ==
Character	North Carolina (2016)	George Street Playhouse Production (2017)	Off-Broadway (2017)
Bobby	Nancy Opel	Nancy Opel	Nancy Opel
Jim and others	Tom Treadwell	Ken Land	Ken Land
Caroline and others	Andrea Bianchi	Andrea Bianchi	Andrea Bianchi
Heidi and others	Laura Dean	Elizabeth Ward Land	Elizabeth Ward Land
Joan and others	MaryAnn Hu	Aisha De Haas	Aisha De Haas
The Shrink and others	Phillip Hoffman	Alan Muraoka	Alan Muraoka
Per Se and others	Christopher Shyer	Christopher Shyer	Christopher Shyer

== Critical reception ==
The New York Times's Anita Gates wrote, "I wish I had Bobby Goldman’s faith that New York is filled with attractive, charming, emotionally stable older men looking for relationships." Suzanna Bowling from Times Square Chronicles wrote, "Nancy Opel, pulls a tour de force, as she embodies the Curvy Widow upstairs at the Westside Theatre. This musical is sure to beat Menopause, as the most popular and highest grossing show in town. Critics were not in love when they saw Menopause, but the authors laugh all the way to the bank. Well move over, because Curvy Widow is bound to surpass that fad."
