= Westside Theatre =

Off-Broadway theater in Manhattan, New York

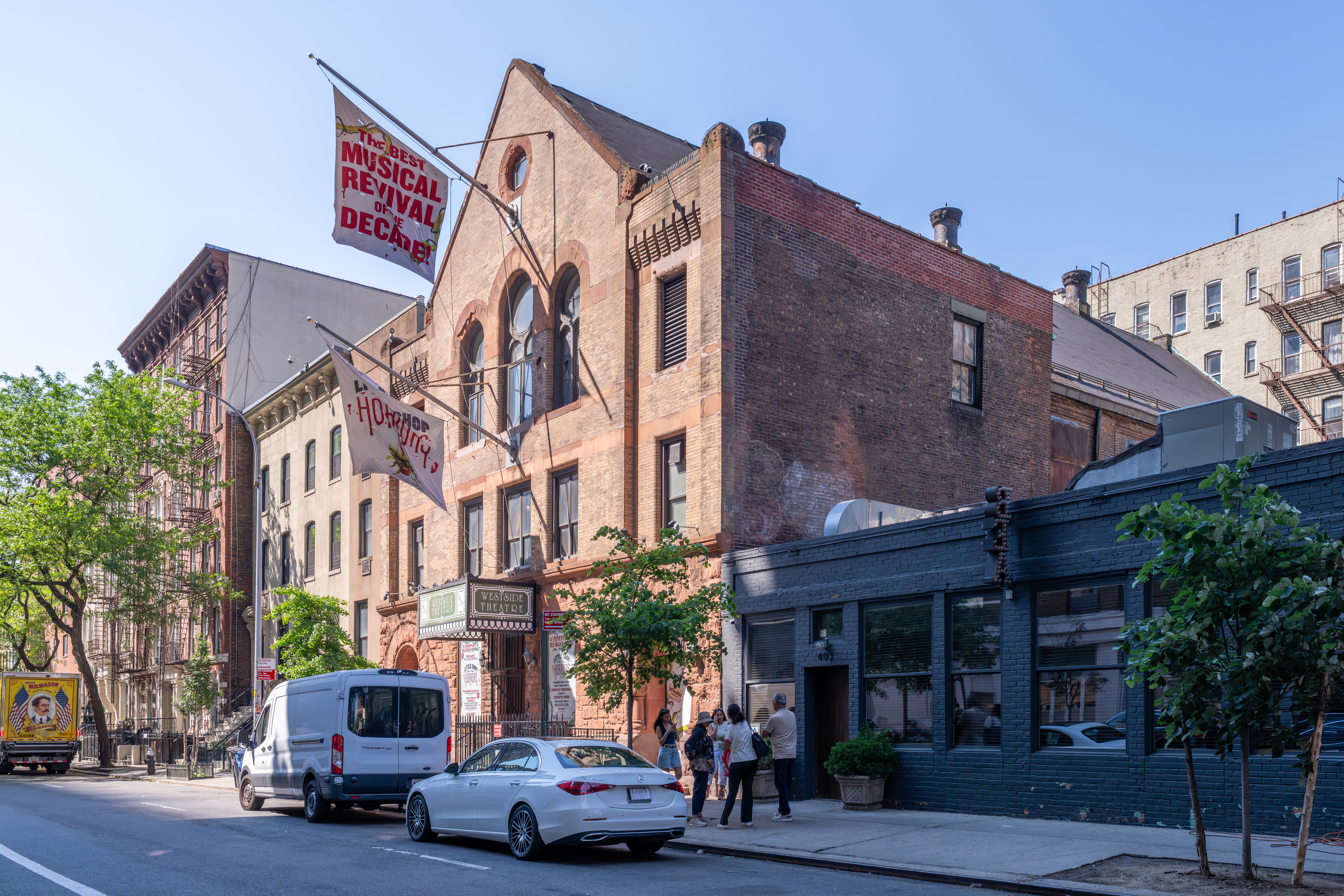
- Interactive map of Westside Theatre
- Address: 407 West 43rd Street; Manhattan, New York City; United States
- Coordinates: 40.7595°N 73.9926°W
- Owner: Reno Productions (Peter Askin)
- Capacity: 270 (Upstairs Theatre); 249 (Downstairs Theatre)
- Type: Off-Broadway

Website
- www.westsidetheatre.com

The Westside Theatre is an off-Broadway performance space at 407 West 43rd Street between Ninth and Tenth Avenues in the Hell's Kitchen neighborhood of Manhattan, New York City. The building houses two auditoriums: the Upstairs Theatre, which seats 270, and the Downstairs Theatre, which features a thrust stage and has a seating capacity of 249. Formerly known as the Chelsea Theatre Center and the Westside Arts Theatre, the building was renovated in 1991.

== History ==
The Romanesque Revival style building, designed by Henry Franklin Kilburn, was constructed in 1890 for the Second German Baptist Church, which it housed until the 1960s. The site was then occupied by various nightclubs until its establishment as a theatre in 1976.

== Selected past productions ==
=== Upstairs ===
Date opened	Show title
October 17, 2019	Little Shop of Horrors
March 7, 2019	Chick Flick the Musical by Suzy Conn
July 20, 2017	Curvy Widow
June 22, 2016	Cagney (502 performances)
October 12, 2015	Clever Little Lies
April 7, 2015	Disenchanted! The Hilarious Hit Musical
October 19, 2014	The Belle of Amherst
March 4, 2014	Satchmo at the Waldorf
October 29, 2013	Becoming Dr. Ruth
November 28, 2012	My Name Is Asher Lev
August 2, 2012	The Last Smoker in America
June 23, 2011	The Voca People
May 10, 2010	The Screwtape Letters
September 14, 2008	The Marvelous Wonderettes
August 1, 1996	I Love You, You're Perfect, Now Change
August 7, 1995	The Food Chain
May 28, 1995	The Cryptogram
December 8, 1994	You Should Be So Lucky by Charles Busch
August 9, 1993	Later Life by A. R. Gurney
February 23, 1993	The Best of Friends
October 9, 1992	Spic-O-Rama by John Leguizamo
June 2, 1992	Balancing Act
March 18, 1991	And the World Goes 'Round
December 4, 1987	Frankie and Johnny in the Clair de Lune
May 7, 1987	Educating Rita
December 22, 1982	Extremities
October 13, 1981	March of the Falsettos
October 14, 1980	Really Rosie

=== Downstairs ===
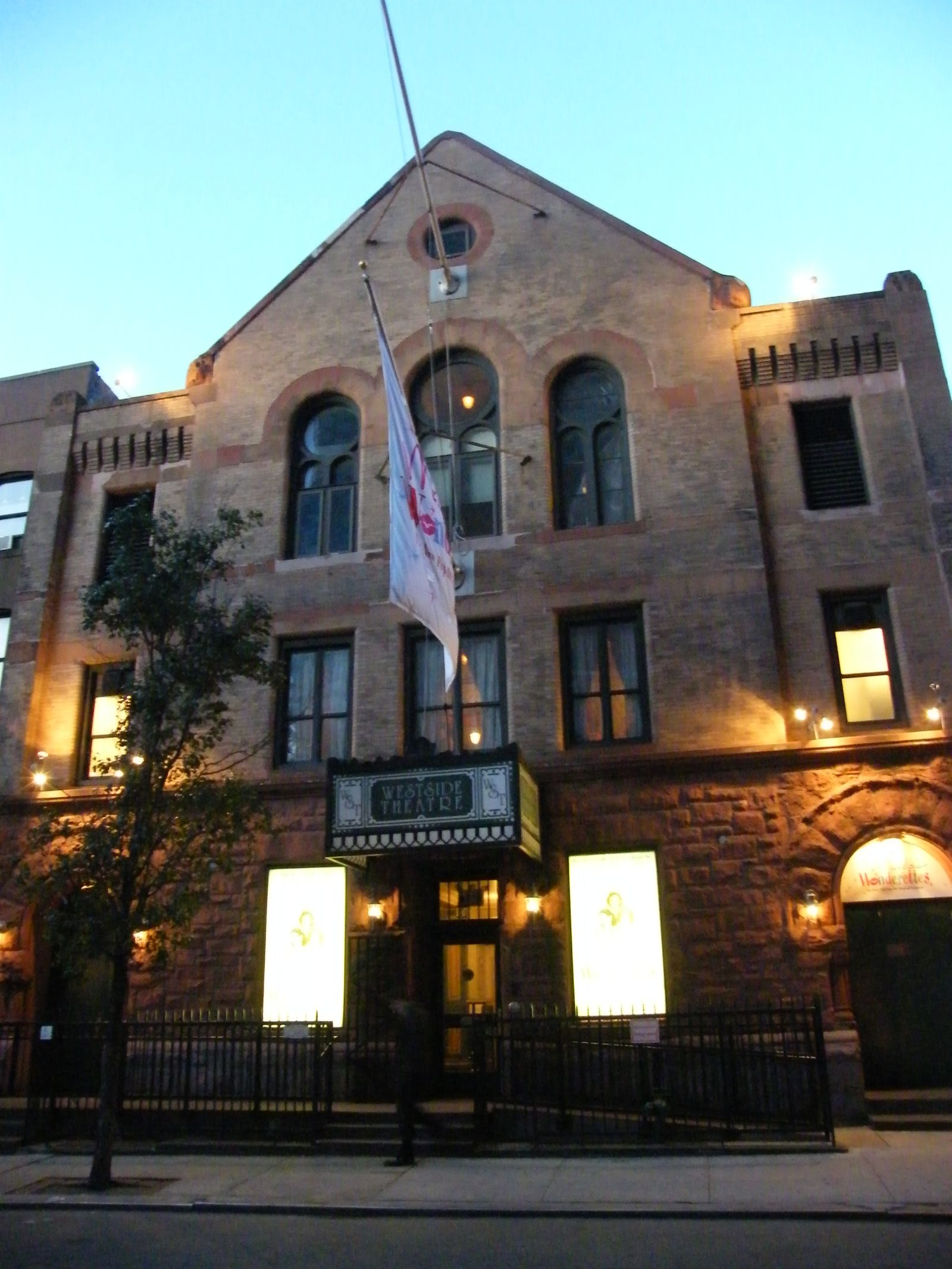
Theatre at dusk

Date opened	Show title
July 21, 2019	#DateMe: An OKCupid Experiment
November 12, 2018	The Other Josh Cohen
October 5, 2017	Stuffed
October 25, 2016	Othello: The Remix
March 7, 2016	White Rabbit Red Rabbit
July 27, 2015	The Absolute Brightness of Leonard Pelkey
February 10, 2015	Application Pending
May 14, 2014	Los Monologos de la Vagina
December 15, 2013	Handle With Care
May 20, 2012	Old Jews Telling Jokes
January 24, 2011	Through the Night
October 1, 2009	Love, Loss, and What I Wore
November 18, 2008	Dust
December 8, 2006	My Mother's Italian, My Father's Jewish, and I'm in Therapy
October 21, 2004	Jewtopia
March 24, 2004	From Door to Door
September 4, 2003	Trumbo: Red, White, and Blacklisted
March 5, 2003	Barbara's Wedding
October 3, 1999	The Vagina Monologues
October 1, 1998	The Mystery of Irma Vep
October 24, 1997	Marc Salem's Mindgames
October 7, 1996	Political Animal
September 24, 1996	Full Gallop
September 7, 1995	Too Jewish
March 5, 1994	Nixon's Nixon
September 28, 1993	Family Secrets by Sherry Glaser
April 23, 1993	Wild Men!
September 8, 1992	Cut the Ribbons
January 3, 1992	Finkle's Follies
April 12, 1991	Only the Truth is Funny
October 29, 1987	A Shayna Maidel
April 18, 1985	Penn & Teller
July 3, 1981	What the Butler Saw
March 22, 1976	Vanities
November 20, 1974	The Mother / The Great Train Robbery, performed by San Francisco Mime Troupe
