= Prairie Village, Kansas =

- City
- Location within Johnson County and Kansas
- Interactive map of Prairie Village, Kansas
- Coordinates: 38°59′31″N 94°37′02″W
- Country: United States
- State: Kansas
- County: Johnson
- Platted: 1941
- Incorporated: 1951

Area
  - Total: 6.22 sq mi (16.11 km^{2})
  - Land: 6.21 sq mi (16.09 km^{2})
  - Water: 0.012 sq mi (0.03 km^{2})
- Elevation: 1,043 ft (318 m)

Population (2020)
  - Total: 22,957
  - Density: 3,695/sq mi (1,427/km^{2})
- Time zone: UTC-6 (CST)
  - Summer (DST): UTC-5 (CDT)
- ZIP Code: 66208
- Area code: 913
- FIPS code: 20-57575
- GNIS ID: 485644
- Website: www.prairievillageks.gov

Prairie Village is a city in Johnson County, Kansas, United States, and located within the Kansas City Metropolitan Area. As of the 2020 census, the population of the city was 22,957.

== History ==
After the successful development of the Country Club Plaza in Kansas City, Missouri, real estate magnate J. C. Nichols turned toward development of his native Johnson County, just a few miles from the Plaza. Prairie Village was platted in 1941 and was named after Prairie School, which was established almost a century before. In 1949, Prairie Village was named the best planned community in America by the National Association of Home Builders. It incorporated in 1951.

Remnants of the Santa Fe Trail are found in the city.

Shawnee, Osage, and Kansa Indians formerly inhabited the land now developed into the City of Prairie Village. In 1858, Thomas Porter bought 160 acres of farmland in what is now Prairie Village; he raised all his children on that farmland and was involved in agricultural development and civic affairs.

Porter's sister, Betty Porter, married Thompson A. Lewis, who owned 80 acres between Mission Road and Roe Avenue.

Henry Coppock arrived in Johnson County in 1857, before heading farther west to work in freighting and farming. He came back in the mid-1860s and bought land in 1865. Coppock built his family home on 900 acres in Prairie Village. Coppock's house stood for 30 years. Now on his land is Homestead County Club.

The original Prairie School was built in 1882, and a new building was constructed in 1912. This landmark was a community treasure until 1990 when it was struck by a bolt of lightning during a storm. The east entrance of the 1912 building still stands at the remodeled school.

In the 1940s, J.C. Nichols, an experienced developer, wanted to turn the farmland into suburban housing for soldiers returning home from the war. Nichols bought farmland from the Porters, Coppocks, and Lewises. There were hurdles along the way including a lack of experienced builders after World War II, but this didn't stop Nichols from pursuing his goal.

Prairie Village continued to expand as the Prairie Village Shopping Center opened in 1947 and the Corinth Square Shopping Center opened in 1955, with subdivisions including Corinth Hills, Corinth Meadows, Corinth Estates, Somerset Hills, Ridgeview Heights, Town & Country Estates, Calvin Crest, Prairie Hills, Prairie Fields and Prairie Ridge, to name a few.

== Geography ==
=== Climate ===
Climate data for Prairie Village, Kansas
Month	Jan	Feb	Mar	Apr	May	Jun	Jul	Aug	Sep	Oct	Nov	Dec	Year
Record high °F (°C)	74 (23)	81 (27)	85 (29)	91 (33)	95 (35)	105 (41)	114 (46)	107 (42)	106 (41)	98 (37)	84 (29)	76 (24)	114 (46)
Mean daily maximum °F (°C)	39 (4)	44 (7)	55 (13)	65 (18)	74 (23)	83 (28)	90 (32)	89 (32)	80 (27)	68 (20)	54 (12)	41 (5)	65 (18)
Daily mean °F (°C)	30 (−1)	34 (1)	44 (7)	55 (13)	65 (18)	74 (23)	79 (26)	77 (25)	69 (21)	58 (14)	44 (7)	32 (0)	55 (13)
Mean daily minimum °F (°C)	20 (−7)	24 (−4)	33 (1)	44 (7)	55 (13)	64 (18)	72 (22)	70 (21)	61 (16)	47 (8)	34 (1)	23 (−5)	46 (8)
Record low °F (°C)	−18 (−28)	−12 (−24)	−8 (−22)	13 (−11)	30 (−1)	43 (6)	48 (9)	46 (8)	30 (−1)	18 (−8)	1 (−17)	−22 (−30)	−22 (−30)

== Demographics ==
Historical population
Census	Pop.	Note	%±
1960	25,356		—
1970	28,378		11.9%
1980	24,657		−13.1%
1990	23,186		−6.0%
2000	22,072		−4.8%
2010	21,447		−2.8%
2020	22,957		7.0%
2025 (est.)	23,008		0.2%
U.S. Decennial Census; 2010-2020

=== Racial and ethnic composition ===
Prairie Village city, Kansas – Racial and ethnic composition Note: the US Census treats Hispanic/Latino as an ethnic category. This table excludes Latinos from the racial categories and assigns them to a separate category. Hispanics/Latinos may be of any race.
Race / Ethnicity (NH = Non-Hispanic)	Pop 2000	Pop 2010	Pop 2020	% 2000	% 2010	% 2020
White alone (NH)	20,906	19,877	20,219	94.72%	92.68%	88.07%
Black or African American alone (NH)	163	210	258	0.74%	0.98%	1.12%
Native American or Alaska Native alone (NH)	36	38	39	0.16%	0.18%	0.17%
Asian alone (NH)	246	303	354	1.11%	1.41%	1.54%
Native Hawaiian or Pacific Islander alone (NH)	5	2	1	0.02%	0.01%	0.00%
Other race alone (NH)	16	8	72	0.07%	0.04%	0.31%
Mixed race or Multiracial (NH)	198	279	929	0.90%	1.30%	4.05%
Hispanic or Latino (any race)	502	730	1,085	2.27%	3.40%	4.73%
Total	22,072	21,447	22,957	100.00%	100.00%	100.00%

=== 2020 census ===
As of the 2020 census, Prairie Village had a population of 22,957, with 9,910 households and 6,108 families.

The population density was 3,696.2 per square mile (1,427.1/km^{2}). Housing units averaged 1,709.7 per square mile (660.1/km^{2}).

The median age was 40.2 years; 22.0% of residents were under the age of 18 and 21.1% were 65 years of age or older. For every 100 females there were 86.7 males, and for every 100 females age 18 and over there were 82.9 males age 18 and over.

100.0% of residents lived in urban areas, while 0.0% lived in rural areas.

Of the 9,910 households, 28.3% had children under the age of 18 living in them. Of all households, 51.3% were married-couple households, 14.0% were households with a male householder and no spouse or partner present, and 29.7% were households with a female householder and no spouse or partner present. About 31.8% of all households were made up of individuals and 15.0% had someone living alone who was 65 years of age or older.

There were 10,619 housing units, of which 6.7% were vacant. The homeowner vacancy rate was 1.5% and the rental vacancy rate was 8.9%.

Racial composition as of the 2020 census
Race	Number	Percent
White	20,565	89.6%
Black or African American	271	1.2%
American Indian and Alaska Native	58	0.3%
Asian	360	1.6%
Native Hawaiian and Other Pacific Islander	2	0.0%
Some other race	232	1.0%
Two or more races	1,469	6.4%

=== 2016–2020 American Community Survey estimates ===
The 2016–2020 5-year American Community Survey estimated the average household size at 2.2 and the average family size at 2.9. The percent of those with a bachelor's degree or higher was estimated to be 52.2% of the population.

The survey showed that the median household income was $88,196 (with a margin of error of +/- $5,978) and the median family income was $123,136 (+/- $8,460). Males had a median income of $65,169 (+/- $6,334) versus $46,660 (+/- $3,472) for females. The median income for those above 16 years old was $52,448 (+/- $2,243). Approximately, 0.7% of families and 3.9% of the population were below the poverty line, including 0.2% of those under the age of 18 and 7.9% of those ages 65 or over.

=== 2010 census ===
As of the census of 2010, there were 21,447 people, 9,771 households, and 5,816 families living in the city. The population density was 3,459.2 inhabitants per square mile (1,335.6/km^{2}). There were 10,227 housing units at an average density of 1,649.5 per square mile (636.9/km^{2}). The racial makeup of the city was 95.3% White, 1.0% African American, 0.2% Native American, 1.4% Asian, 0.5% from other races, and 1.6% from two or more races. Hispanic or Latino of any race were 3.4% of the population.

There were 9,771 households. 26.3% had children under the age of 18, 48.8% were married couples living together, 8.1% had a female householder with no husband present, 2.6% had a male householder with no wife present, and 40.5% were non-families. 34.1% of all households were made up of individuals, and 12.9% had someone living alone aged 65 years or older. The average household size was 2.18 and the average family size was 2.82.

The median age in the city was 41.4 years. 21% of residents were under the age of 18; 5% were between the ages of 18 and 24; 28.4% were from 25 to 44; 27.7% were from 45 to 64; and 17.9% were 65 years of age or older. The gender makeup of the city was 46.5% male and 53.5% female.

== Economy ==
=== Largest employers ===
According to the city's 2018 Comprehensive Annual Financial Report, the largest employers in the city are:

#	Employer	# of Employees
1	Shawnee Mission USD 512	627
2	Hy-Vee	196
3	Hen House Grocery #22	178
4	Claridge Court	141
5	City of Prairie Village	130
6	Brighton Gardens	110
7	Better Homes & Gardens Real Estate	100
8	Bijin Salon & Day Spa	98
9	WireCo WorldGroup	95
10	Macy's	84

== Education ==
Public education in Prairie Village is administered by the Shawnee Mission School District. Middle school students attend Indian Hills Middle School, whose mascot is the Knight. High school students attend Shawnee Mission East High School.

=== Libraries ===
The Johnson County Library serves residents of Prairie Village. The library's Corinth branch is in Prairie Village.

== Sister cities ==
- Dolyna, Ivano-Frankivsk Oblast, Ukraine
- Schaerbeek, Belgium

== Notable people ==
Notable individuals who were born in and/or have lived in Prairie Village include actor and martial artist Chuck Norris, actress and dancer Sandahl Bergman, Joyce DiDonato, internationally acclaimed opera singer, former Governor of Kansas Robert Bennett, and pastor and Kansas Senator-elect Adam Hamilton.

== Gallery ==
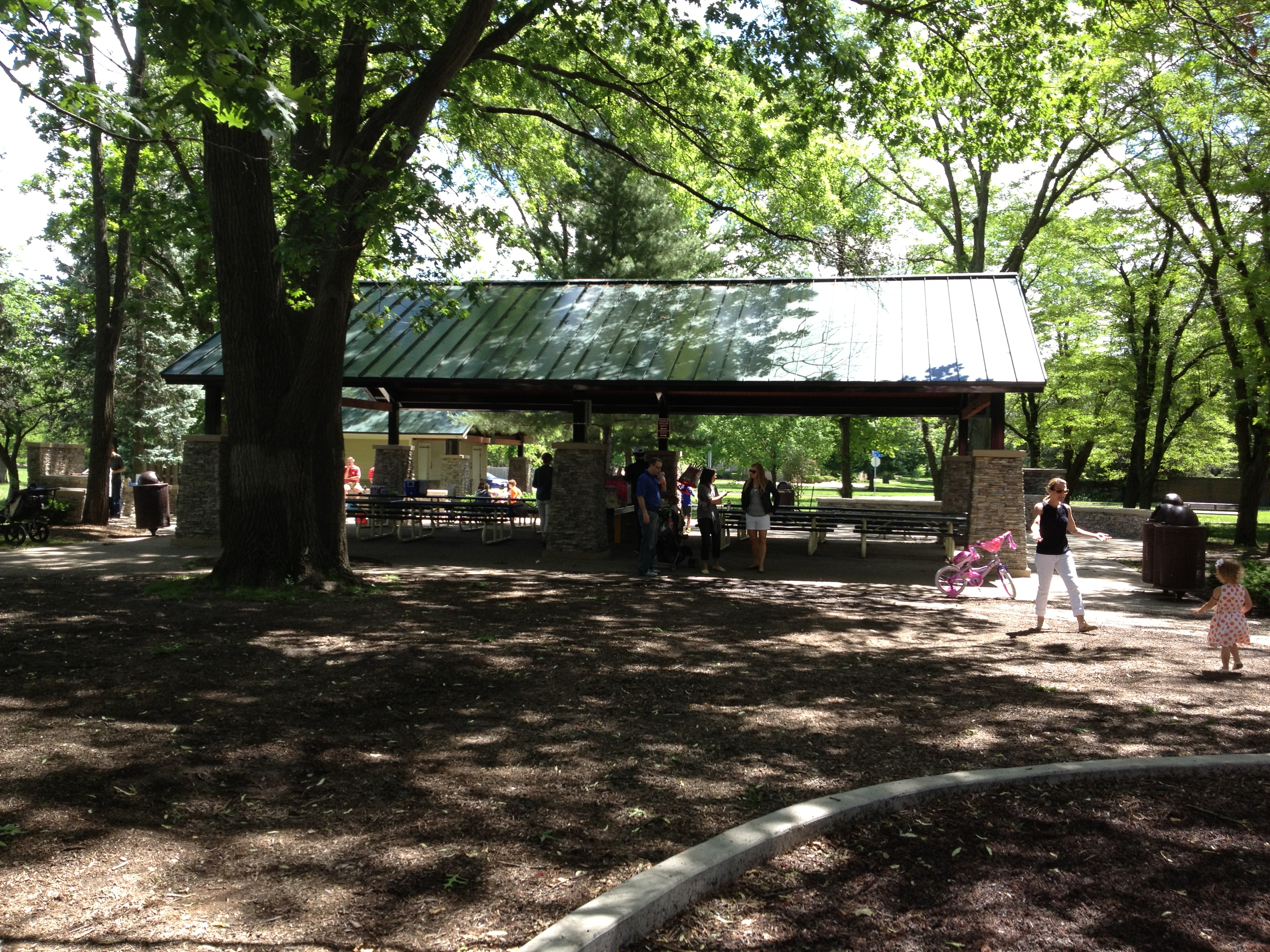
Dining pavilion at Franklin Park in Prairie Village, Kansas.

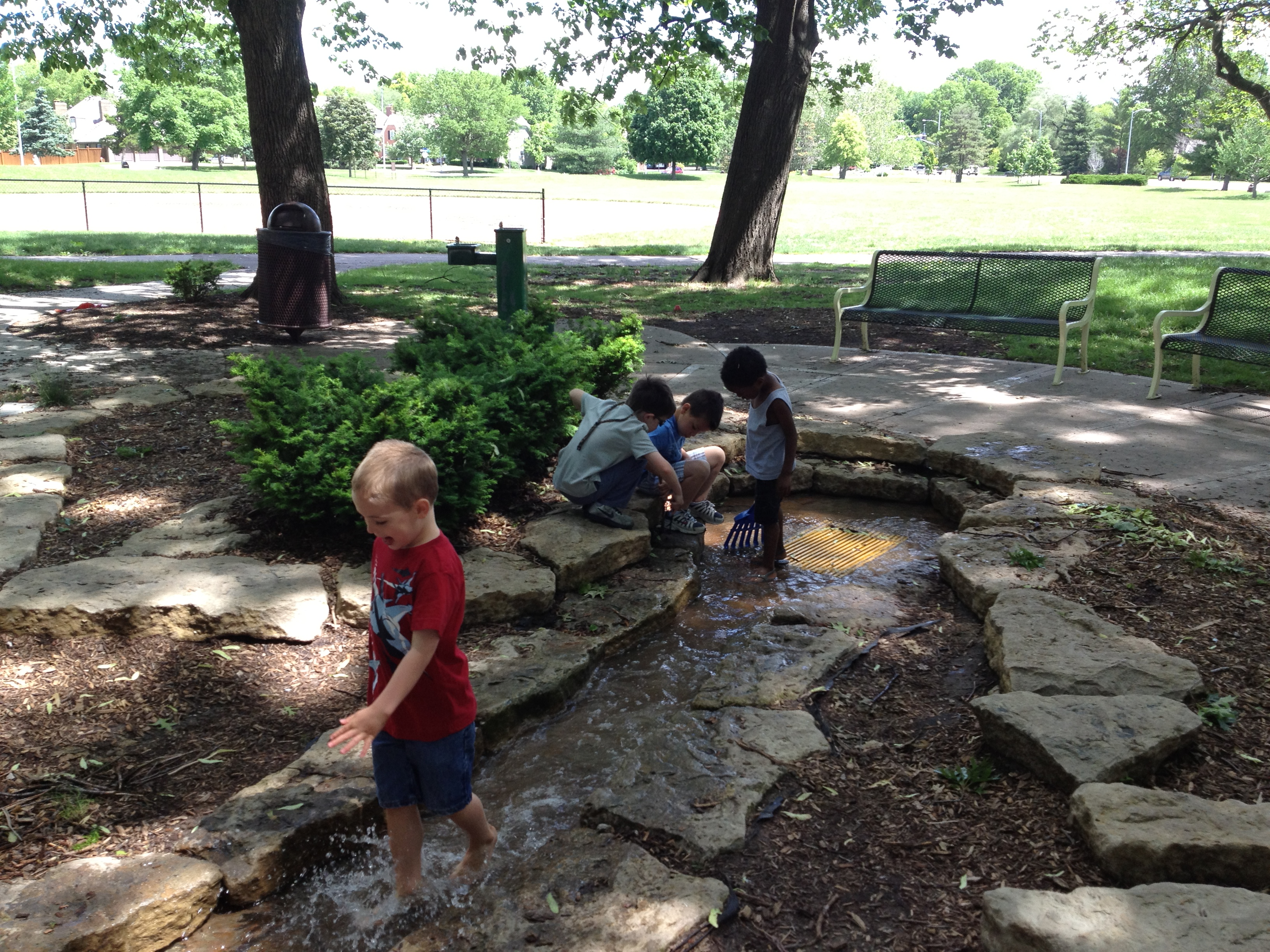
Children playing in the stream at Franklin Park in Prairie Village, Kansas

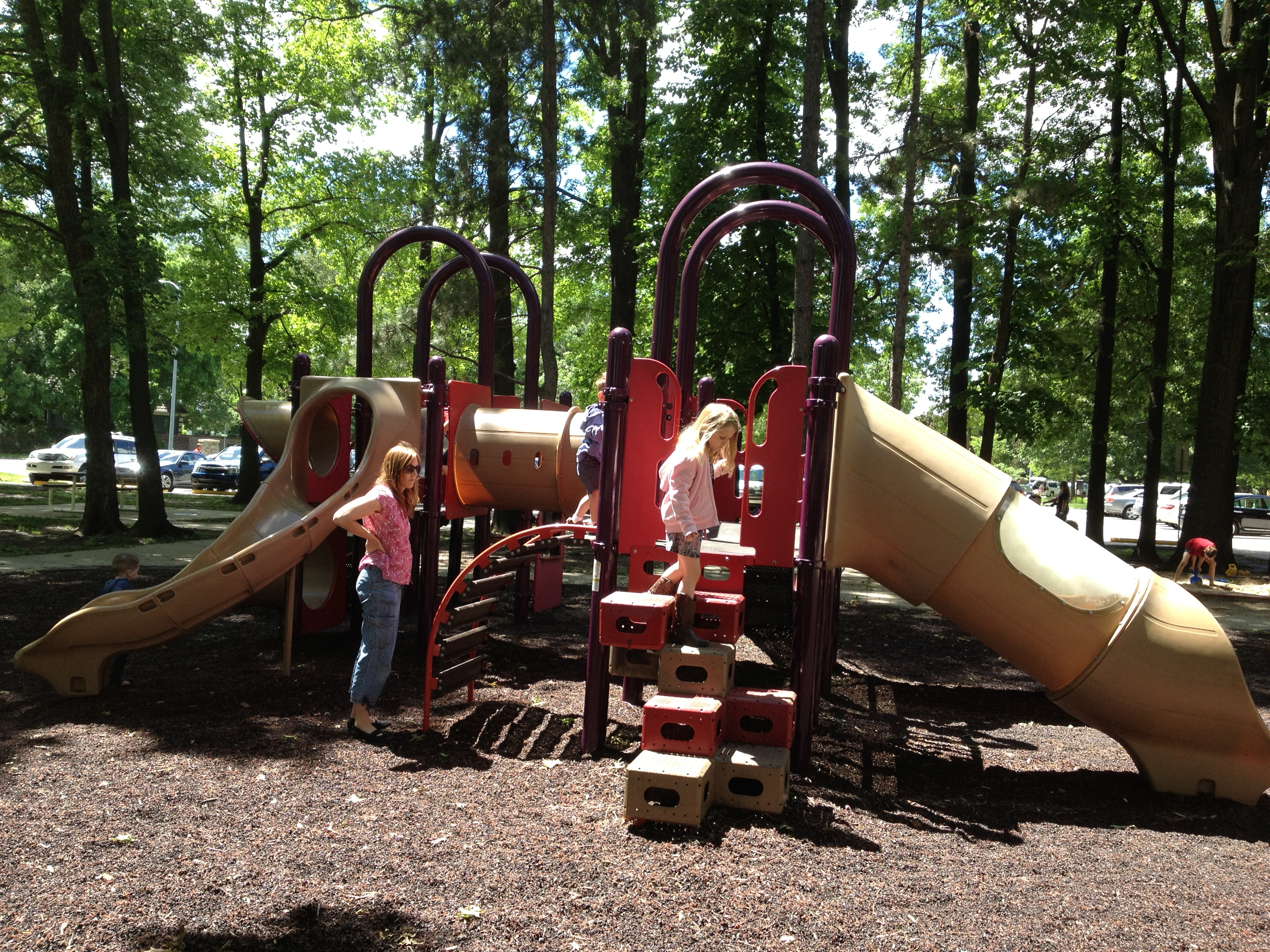
Children playing on playground equipment
