= Brittany Gray =

Canadian actress, entrepreneur and dancer (born 1985)

- Born: Brittany Alexandra Gray; December 17, 1985 (age 40); Pickering, Ontario, Canada
- Occupations: Entrepreneur, actress, singer, dancer
- Years active: 1990–present
- Website: Official website

Brittany Gray (born December 17, 1985) is a Canadian actress, dancer, and entrepreneur. In 2009, she played Sarah in The Toxic Avenger during its Toronto run. She appeared as part of the dance ensemble in Chicago (2002), The Producers (2003), Once Upon a Mattress (2005), and Amelia (2009). In 2006, she founded the Toronto-based beauty agency Fancy Face; she has since opened a second location in Vancouver.

== Early life ==
Gray was born and raised in Pickering, Ontario, the daughter of an entrepreneur father. She began dancing at the age of three and trained at the Denise Lester Dance Academy. In her adolescence, she modeled for Sears and Eaton's, and danced at Canada's Wonderland in the early 2001 and 2002. She graduated from St. Mary Catholic Secondary School and trained at CMU College of Makeup Art and Design.

== Career ==
Gray secured a role as a dancer in Chicago at age 15 while still dancing at Canada's Wonderland. She danced as part of an ensemble in stage shows such as The Producers and We Will Rock You, and films including Eloise at the Plaza, Once Upon a Mattress, and Amelia. She appeared in Confessions of a Teenage Drama Queen as Megan Fox's dance double and as a backup dancer in the music videos for Aaron Carter's "Not Too Young, Not Too Old" and "Leave It Up to Me". She guest starred on Aaron Stone, InSecurity (2011), Dan for Mayor (2011), Lost Girl (2013), Reign (2014), and Holly Hobbie (2019). In 2009, she played the lead role of Sarah, a blind librarian and love interest, in The Toxic Avenger, for which she received positive reviews. The show opened at Danforth Music Hall. Gray also appeared as Case Model #5 on Deal or No Deal Canada.

In 2006, Gray founded Fancy Face, a beauty and fashion boutique mainly servicing TV shows, music videos, and fashion shoots. In the company's nascent years, she was servicing weddings while appearing in eight shows of We Will Rock You each week. In 2011, she worked as a makeup artist on So You Think You Can Dance Canada. By the mid-2010s, Gray had largely stepped away from acting to focus on her business. She has appeared as a beauty expert on shows such as Good Morning America, CityLine, and ET Canada. As of 2023, the company was bringing in more than $1 million annually.

== Filmography ==
=== Theatre ===
Year	Title	Role	Notes	Ref
2003	The Producers	Ensemble	At Canon Theatre	
2007-2008	We Will Rock You	Ensemble	At Canon Theatre	
2009	The Toxic Avenger	Sarah	At Danforth Music Hall	
2011	Queen Milli of Galt	Mona	Theatre Aquarius	

=== Film and television ===
Year	Title	Role	Notes	Ref
2002	Chicago	Dancer	"Cell Block Tango"	
2005	Once Upon a Mattress	Ensemble	TV movie	
2009	Amelia	Dancer	Danced in commercial sequence	
2009-2010	Aaron Stone	Hive	2 episodes	
2010	Faces of Hillary	Hillary	Short	
2011	InSecurity	Amber	1 episode	
2011	Dan for Mayor	Melanie	1 episode	
2012	Life with Boys	Flight attendant	1 episode	
2012	Green Apple	Samantha Kowalski	Short	
2013	Lost Girl	Delia	1 episode	
2013	Finding Christmas	Kimber	TV movie	
2014	Dear Viola	Jamie Estevez	TV movie	
2014	Reign	Gabrielle	1 episode	
2019	Holly Hobbie	Gwen Taylor	2 episodes	
