= Rochester Midland Corporation =

American chemical company

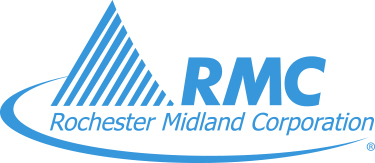

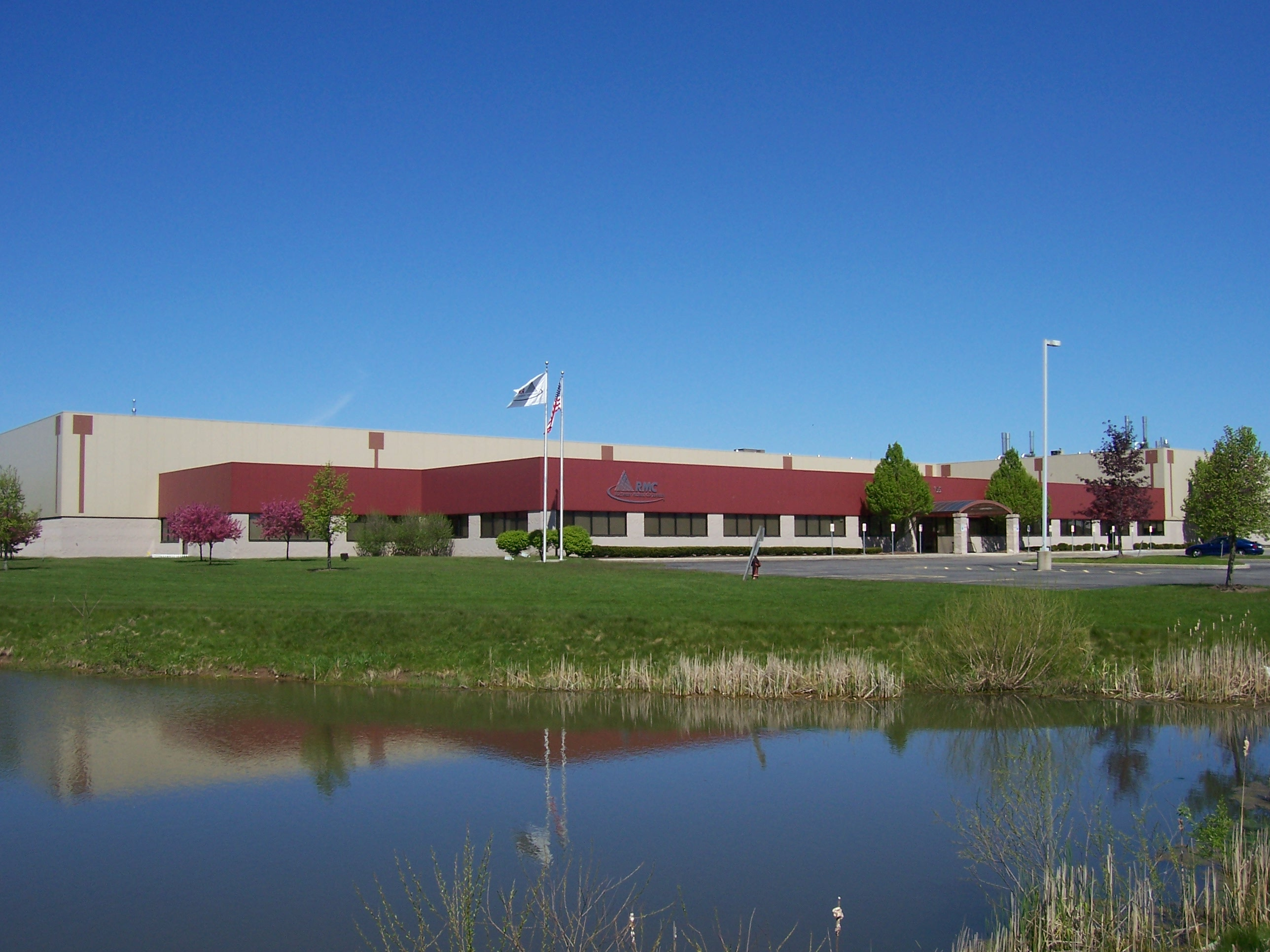
- Headquarters in Ogden, New York
- Company type: Private
- Industry: Chemicals
- Predecessor: Rochester Germicide Company
- Founded: 1888 in Rochester, New York, United States
- Founder: Daniel N. Calkins and Clarence P. Crowell
- Headquarters: Ogden, New York, United States
- Area served: United States, Canada, Latin America, UK plus 50 additional countries
- Key people: Harlan D. Calkins, Chairman; H. Bradley Calkins, co-CEO; Katherine C. Lindahl, co-CEO
- Services: Water treatment, food and beverage sanitiation, hygiene solutions, sustainable cleaning technologies
- Divisions: Water Energy Division; Food Safety Division; Global Division; Facility Supplies Division; WellBeing Hygiene Division
- Website: www.rochestermidland.com

Rochester Midland Corporation is a closely-held specialty chemical manufacturing company headquartered in Ogden, New York. It has sales and operations in nearly seventy countries, production facilities in Ogden, New York, Aurora, Illinois. It was founded as Rochester Germicide in 1888.
