= Andrew Cassara =

- Born: Andrew Cassara; December 12, 1995 (age 30); Ottawa, Ontario, Canada
- Origin: Ottawa
- Genres: Pop; dance-pop; pop-rock
- Occupation: Singer-songwriter
- Instruments: Vocals, guitar
- Years active: 2012–present
- Label: SGMGroupArtists
- Website: www.andrewcassaramusic.com

Andrew Cassara is a singer-songwriter from Ottawa, Ontario.

== Influences ==
Cassara expressed that his influences for the direction of his sound are Maroon 5, Justin Timberlake, Backstreet Boys, Charlie Puth.

== Career ==
In 2018, Cassara headlined the Youth X Canada Tour, performing for and engaging with audiences at youth centres across Ontario in an effort to encourage young people to share their own stories and mental health struggles. He’s also performed in the US, South Korea, Singapore, Japan and Sweden at showcases, festivals, clubs, and conferences, and shared the stage with prominent Canadian and International artists Shawn Mendes, Chromeo, Tyler Shaw, Lauv and others.

== Discography ==
=== Studio album ===
Title and details
Freak on Repeat
- Type: Full-Length Album
- Released: May 1, 2020
- Label: SGMGroupArtists

No.	Title	Length
1.	"Bad Bad"
2.	"Fever (Bring The F**K Mix)"
3.	"Fingertips"
4.	"Money"
5.	"Dancing Mono"
6.	"You Are"
7.	"My Love Again"
8.	"Funkadelic"
9.	"Get Down"
10.	"Stay Rockin'"
11.	"Bad Bad (Extended)"

=== Extended play ===
Title and details
The Big Bang
- Type: Compilation Album
- Released: 14 September 2018
- Label: SGMGroupArtists

No.	Title	Length
1.	"That's Some Crazy"
2.	"New Me No You"
3.	"B.T.I.F.R"
4.	"All Over You"
5.	"Last Time"
6.	"Taking Chances"
7.	"Tell Me Now"
8.	"I Know"
9.	"Live Your Life"

I Know EP
- Type: EP
- Released: 24 November 2013
- Label: SGMGroupArtists
- - No Longer Distributed

No.	Title	Length
1.	"I Know"
2.	"Live Your Life"
3.	"Taking Chances"
4.	"Last Time"

=== Singles ===
- 2013: "Live Your Life"
- 2013: "Taking Chances"
- 2014: "I Know"
- 2015: "That's Some Crazy"
- 2016: "New Me No You"
- 2017: "Victim"
- 2018: "Fever"
- 2019: "Get Down"
- 2019: "Dancing Mono"
- 2020: "Bad Bad"

=== Guest appearances ===
List of non-single songs with guest appearances by Andrew Cassara
Title	Year	Album	Artist(s)
"Time Zones"	2017	N/A	Guy Fiasco
"If Anything"	2017	Ecstasy Palm Dreams	4PointPanic
