= Ami Kassar =

Ami Kassar is the founder and CEO of MultiFunding, and the author of The Growth Dilemma. He is a small business advocate and a nationally renowned expert on access to capital for entrepreneurs. In addition, Kassar writes a regular column for Inc.com and is a speaker at universities and business events across the country on topics such as entrepreneurship and access to capital.

Kassar is also known for his research on the small business lending market, in which he confronts and challenges some of the largest banks in America for their lending records to small businesses. Kassar concluded that smaller community-oriented banks hold a disproportionately large share of small business loan balances.

== Banking Grades ==
In May 2012, Kassar and his company MultiFunding launched Banking Grades, a site that allowed small business owners to search for banks that have a proven commitment to small business lending. With this tool, Kassar confronted and challenged some of the largest banks in America for their lending records to small businesses. He concluded that smaller community-oriented banks hold a disproportionately large share of small business loan balances.

Kassar's criticisms of the big banks have been contested by representatives from the Financial Services Roundtable, as well as SBA Administrator Karen Mills. Mills referenced a commitment by the nation's 13 largest banks to increase small business lending by $20 billion, of which $11 billion in gains have already been made. Some small business bankers believed Kassar's characterization of the big banks is unfair. They pointed out the importance of exercising caution in making loans, to avoid repeating some of the risky lending practices that contributed to the recession.

== Bibliography ==
In January 2018, Kassar debuted his first book entitled, The Growth Dilemma: Determining Your Entrepreneurial Type to Find Your Financing Comfort Zone. In his book, Kassar helps entrepreneurs decide how big they want to grow their businesses, how quickly, with how much risk and leverage. The book contains 15 profiles of different business owners, their revenue numbers, growth targets, and investment strategies.
