= Maxime Cassara =

French professional footballer (born 1991)

Personal information
- Date of birth: 21 August 1991 (age 35)
- Place of birth: Bron, France
- Height: 1.90 m (6 ft 3 in)
- Position: Goalkeeper

Youth career
- –2005: Lyon
- 2005–2009: Saint-Étienne

Senior career*
Years	Team	Apps	(Gls)
2008–2009	Saint-Étienne B	5	(0)
2010–2013	Vénissieux	44	(0)
2013–2014	RWS Bruxelles	2	(0)
2014–2017	Lyon-Duchère	52	(0)
2017–2019	Gazélec Ajaccio	9	(0)
2020–2021	Bourg-en-Bresse	29	(0)
- * Club domestic league appearances and goals as of 19:33, 7 December 2021 (UTC)

Maxime Cassara (born 21 August 1991) is a French professional footballer who plays as a goalkeeper.

== Career ==
Cassara trained as a youth with the training centres of Lyon and Saint-Étienne, then playing a season in the French fifth tier with Vénissieux before moving to Belgium for a season with RWS Bruxelles. Returning to France without a club, he eventually signed for Lyon-Duchère. He was first choice in the team which won promotion from to the Championnat National in 2016–17, and a good season in the higher level earned him a move to Ligue 2 side Gazélec Ajaccio in the summer of 2017.

Cassara made his debut at the professional level for Gazélec Ajaccion in a Coupe de la Ligue tie against US Créteil-Lusitanos on 8 August 2017.

In May 2020, Cassara signed for Bourg-en-Bresse.
