= Lucia Cassarà =

Italian pianist and writer

Lucia Cassarà (born 9 February 1999 in Palermo) is an Italian pianist and writer.

== Formation and activity ==
Lucia Cassarà was born in Palermo but lives between Alcamo and Bologna. She started playing the piano aged six, and two years later won her first prize at the Concorso Nazionale per Giovani Musicisti (National Competition for Young Musicians) of Palermo organised by the Collegium Ars Musica.

In 2019 she was awarded a laurea (degree) in piano by the Conservatorio Musicale Antonio Scontrino of Trapani, with a thesis entitled "Il Pianoforte nel Cinema: la musica classica nelle pellicole cinematografiche". In 2021, she was awarded a master's degree at the Palermo Conservatory for a thesis on Pictures at an Exhibition by Modest Mussorgsky.

In 2023, at University of Bologna, she obtained the second master's degree in cinema, television and multimedia production, with the thesis "Gli accompagnamenti musicali nel Cinema - Origine, Evoluzione e Restauro del Suono".

Lucia Cassarà has worked at the Cineteca di Bologna, cataloguing the musical archive owned by the film director Vittorio De Sica and Giuditta Rissone, his first wife. At the restoration laboratory L'immagine Ritrovata in Bologna she has researched sound restoration of films, including the period of silent film and live musical accompaniments.

Aged fourteen, she composed a soundtrack for the film Contenere l'infinito by Alessandro Ferrara, a film director from Alcamo, based on the eponymous story by Maria Sandias, with the participation of the actor Sebastiano Somma. Lucia collaborates also with various magazines, writing about history of cinema, and has created a cine-blog on her site.

== Works ==
In her first book, Mozart, Disney & Co. - L'immagine e il suono: la magia del cinema, (Ernesto Di Lorenzo editore, 2023), presented at the Turin International Book Fair in May 2024, she explores the history of cinema through music.

== Classical Music at the Cinema ==
Since the beginning of cinema, classical music has accompanied film. Cassarà's project, "Classical Music at the Cinema", proposes piano concerts inside theatres and cinema halls.

== Concerts ==
- 22 May 2018: she played during the launch of a book, Mare Nero, by Francesco Viviano.
- 2019, 2020 and 2021: she played during the awards of the Premio Letterario Nazionale Cielo d'Alcamo (National Literary Prize).
- 2022: she gave a lecture-concert on Pictures at an Exhibition.
- 18 February 2024: she accompanied Stefano La Colla at the Teatro Comunale "Cielo d'Alcamo".
- 9 March 2024: she gave a lecture-concert on classical music in cinema for the Libera Università Tito Marrone in Trapani.
- 31 May 2024: she gave a concert in Alcamo on music and cinema.
- 13 July 2024: she performed music by Philip Glass at a concert in Gibellina.
- 20 December 2024: she performed at Sala Eutherpe, León, Spain.
- 1 February 2025: she played at the Palazzo dei Carmelitani in Partinico, in a concert held on the 1st centenary of Danilo Dolci's birth, and of the 69th anniversary of the Sciopero alla Rovescia.
