= CASAR =

German wire rope producing company

CASAR Drahtseilwerk Saar GmbH is a German manufacturer of high-performance steel wire rope founded in 1948 and based in Kirkel, Saarland. Since 2007 it has been part of WireCo, marketing special ropes for cranes, mining and other heavy-lift applications under the CASAR brand.

== History ==
The company CASAR Drahtseilwerk Saar was founded in 1948 by Joseph Verreet . CASAR is an abbreviation for the French term Câblerie Sarroise, meaning "Saarland cable factory". CASAR produced the first 8-strand ropes in 1949, at a time when 6-strand ropes were usual. Space Mountain at EuroDisney works with a wire rope from CASAR. In 2006, CASAR developed composite ropes to decrease weight.

Since 2007 CASAR has been part of WireCo WorldGroup.

The economist Christoph Müller, professor at the University of St. Gallen, included Casar as a hidden champion in his list of market leaders 2018, which he compiled together with Wirtschaftswoche. According to him, Casar is the world market leader for special wire ropes (crane and mining ropes).
