= Karimabigha =

Village in Sheikhpura, Bihar, India

Karima Bigha
- Village
- Location of Karimabigha Karima Bigha (India)
- Coordinates: 25°2′57″N 85°47′28″E
- Country: India
- State: Bihar
- Division: Munger
- District: Sheikhpura
- Elevation: 55 m (180 ft)

Population
  - Total: 400

Languages
  - Official: Hindi
- Time zone: UTC+5:30 (IST)
- Pin Codes: 81105

Karima Bigha is a small village in Sheikhpura District, in Bihar, India.

== Geography ==
Karima Bigha has a humid subtropical climate (Köppen: Cwa), similar to the rest of the Ganges river region.

The climate of Karima Bigha is varied throughout the year. The average temperature during summer (March to June) ranges from 26 °C (79 °F) to 34 °C (93 °F), and 15 °C (59 °F) to 31 °C (88 °F) during the rest of the year. The average annual rainfall is 92 millimetres (3.6 in). Maximum precipitation occurs during the northeast monsoon (June-August).

=== Climate ===
Climate data for Karima Bigha
Month	Jan	Feb	Mar	Apr	May	Jun	Jul	Aug	Sep	Oct	Nov	Dec	Year
Mean daily maximum °C (°F)	15.0 (59.0)	29.0 (84.2)	35.0 (95.0)	41.0 (105.8)	42.0 (107.6)	40.0 (104.0)	34.0 (93.2)	33.0 (91.4)	32.0 (89.6)	31.0 (87.8)	29.0 (84.2)	25.0 (77.0)	32.2 (90.0)
Mean daily minimum °C (°F)	8.0 (46.4)	11.0 (51.8)	17.0 (62.6)	23.0 (73.4)	27.0 (80.6)	28.0 (82.4)	26.0 (78.8)	25.0 (77.0)	24.0 (75.2)	20.0 (68.0)	14.0 (57.2)	10.0 (50.0)	20.3 (68.5)
Average rainfall mm (inches)	4.0 (0.16)	13.0 (0.51)	8.0 (0.31)	6.0 (0.24)	16.0 (0.63)	152.0 (5.98)	321.0 (12.64)	272.0 (10.71)	220.0 (8.66)	75.0 (2.95)	14.0 (0.55)	3.0 (0.12)	1,104 (43.46)
Average rainy days	1.0	2.0	1.0	2.0	3.0	13.0	24.0	24.0	21.0	7.0	1.0	1.0	100.0

== Demographics ==
There are a total of 65-70 families in the village, comprising a population of 350-450, of which 52% are males and 48% are females according to the Census of 2011.

All its people are Kurmi.

== Government ==
As per the Constitution of India and Panchyati Raaj Act, Karimabigha village is administrated by Mukhiya (Head of Panchayat) who is elected representative of Panchayat. Karimabigha comes under Sheikhpura legislative constituency of state of Bihar and it also comes under the Sheikhpura Lok Sabha constituency.

== Economy ==
Agriculture is the main occupation, with the main crops being rice, onions, and wheat. The cultivation and growing of onion also offers substantial income to the residents.
