= El Casar de Escalona =

Village in Toledo, Castile-La Mancha, Spain

Coordinates: 40°03′N 4°31′W

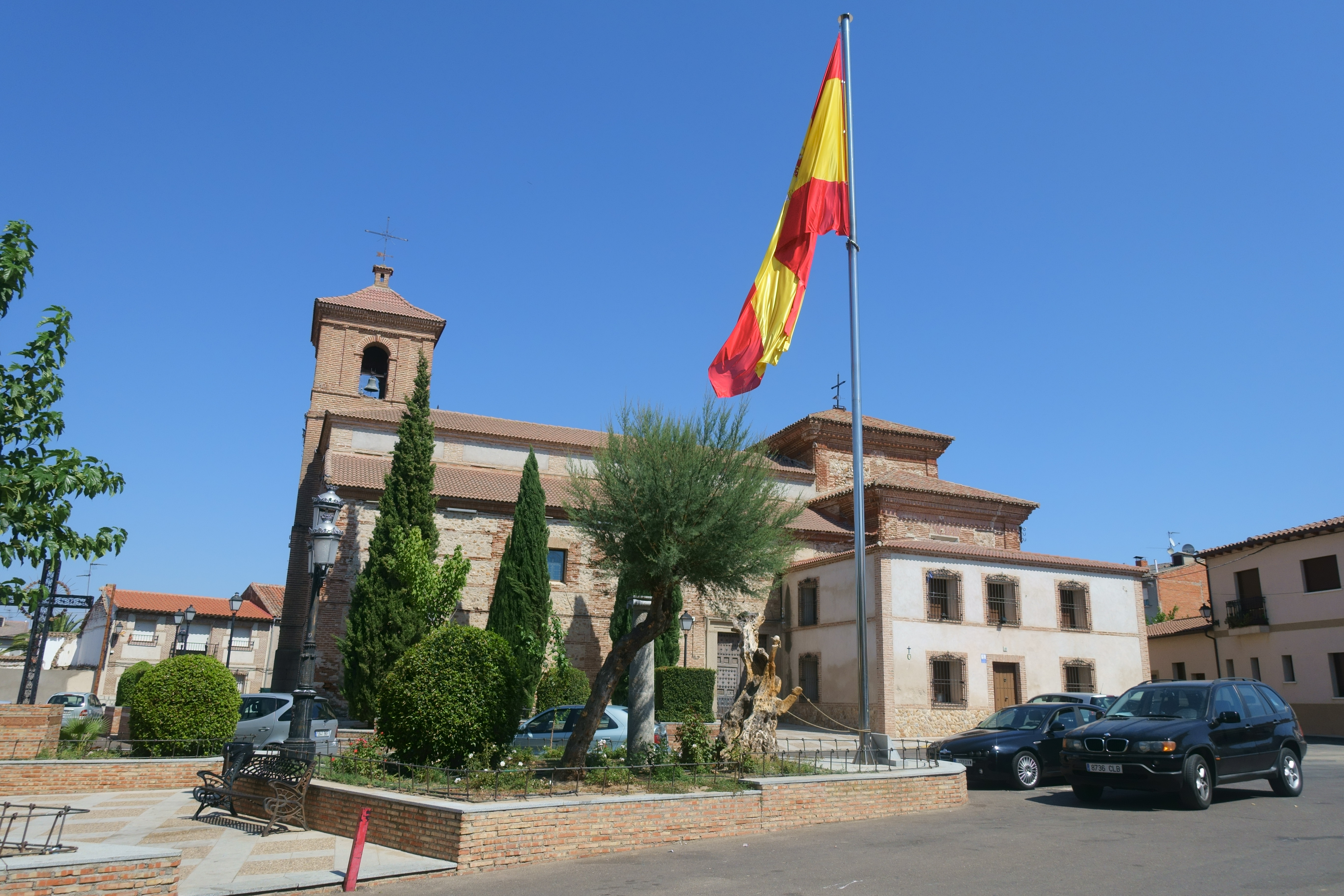
Church of San Julián in El Casar de Escalona, Toledo, Spain

Flag of El Casar de Escalona

Coat of arms of El Casar de Escalona

El Casar de Escalona is a village in the province of Toledo and autonomous community of Castile-La Mancha, Spain.

== Demographics ==
Historical population
Year	Pop.	±%
1900	1,278	—
1910	1,520	+18.9%
1920	1,696	+11.6%
1930	1,794	+5.8%
1940	1,653	−7.9%
1950	1,679	+1.6%
1960	1,533	−8.7%
1970	1,031	−32.7%
1981	859	−16.7%
1991	865	+0.7%
2001	986	+14.0%
2011	2,288	+132.0%
2021	1,791	−21.7%
2023	2,011	+12.3%
Source: INE
