= Mireille Kassar =

Mireille Kassar (born 1963) is an artist born in Lebanon who lives and works in Paris and Beirut.

== Biography ==
She was born in Zahlé. Kassar was educated in the École nationale supérieure des Beaux-Arts and the Sorbonne. She is a member of the school of plastic arts at the Sorbonne.

Kassar works in film, sound, painting and drawing, as well as installation art. She has exhibited at the Fundació Joan Miró, at the Université de Nanterre, at the Havana Biennial, in Copenhagen and in Toronto. Her work is held in the collections of the British Museum and the Centre Georges Pompidou and in private collections such as the Montanari Collection in Bologna and the Clin Collection in London.

Her short film The Children of Uzai, Antinarcissus was shown at the Berlin International Film Festival; it was acquired by the Centre Georges Pompidou.
