= Qassar Khusayfah =

Qassar Khusayfah Islands
- Location within Bahrain

Geography
- Location: Persian Gulf
- Coordinates: 26.29°N 50.622°E
- Archipelago: Bahrain
- Adjacent to: Persian Gulf
- Total islands: 3
- Major islands: Khusayfah
- Area: 0.23 km^{2} (0.089 sq mi)
- Highest elevation: 0 m (0 ft)

Administration
- Bahrain
- Governorate: Muharraq Governorate

Demographics
- Demonym: Bahraini
- Population: 0 (2016)
- Pop. density: 0/km^{2} (0/sq mi)
- Ethnic groups: Bahraini, non-Bahraini

Additional information
- Time zone: AST (UTC+3)
- ISO code: BH-14
- Official website: www.bahrain.com

Qassar Khusayfah are a group of islets in Bahrain. It lies off the north of Muharraq Island, with a distance of 9 km (5.6 mi) northeast of the capital, Manama, on Bahrain Island.

== Administration ==
The island belongs to Muharraq Governorate .

== Image gallery ==
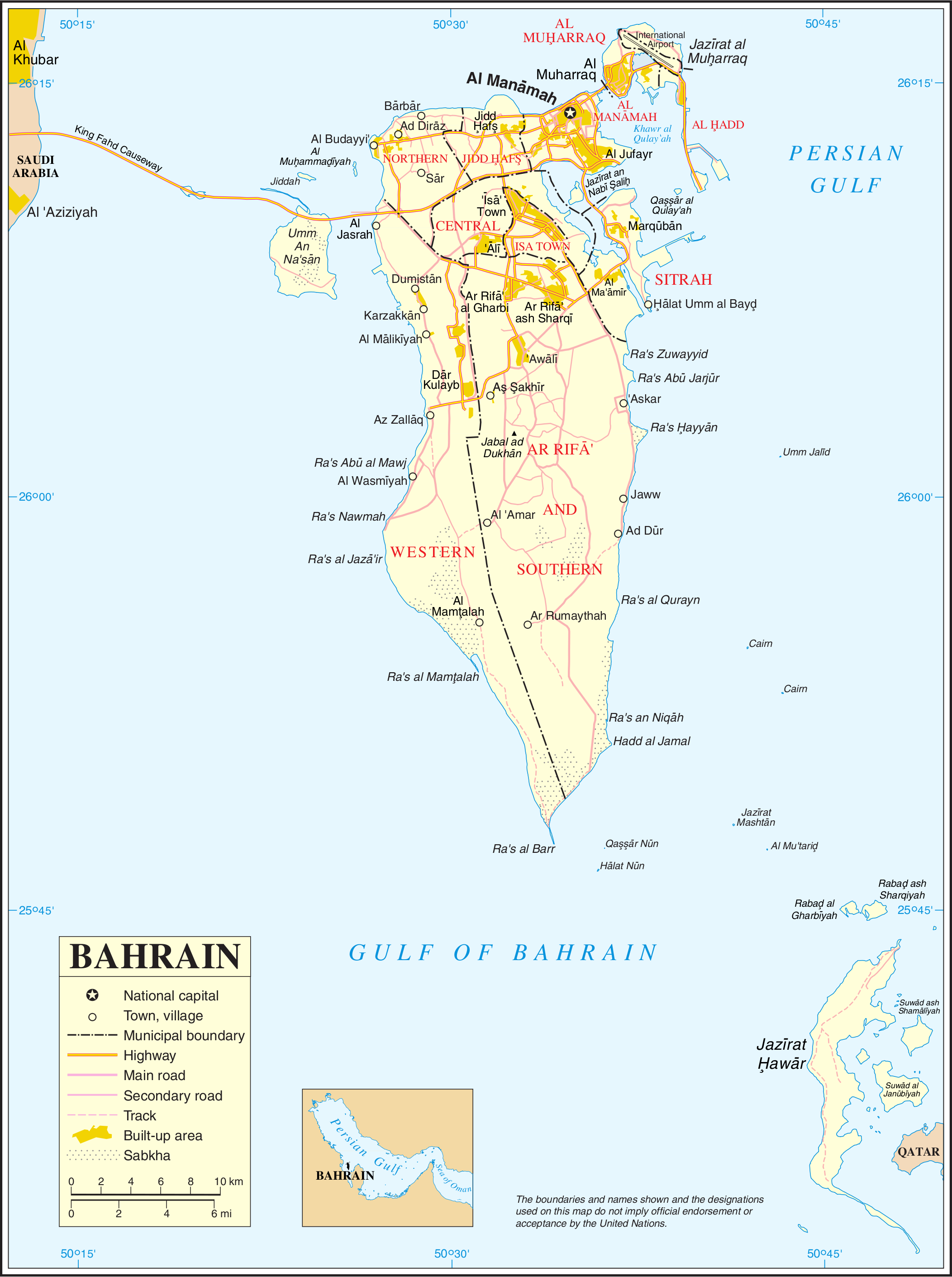
Map 1

District Map

== See also ==
- List of islands of Bahrain
