= Cassaro, Sicily =

Cassaro Càssuru (Sicilian)
- Comune
- Comune di Cassaro
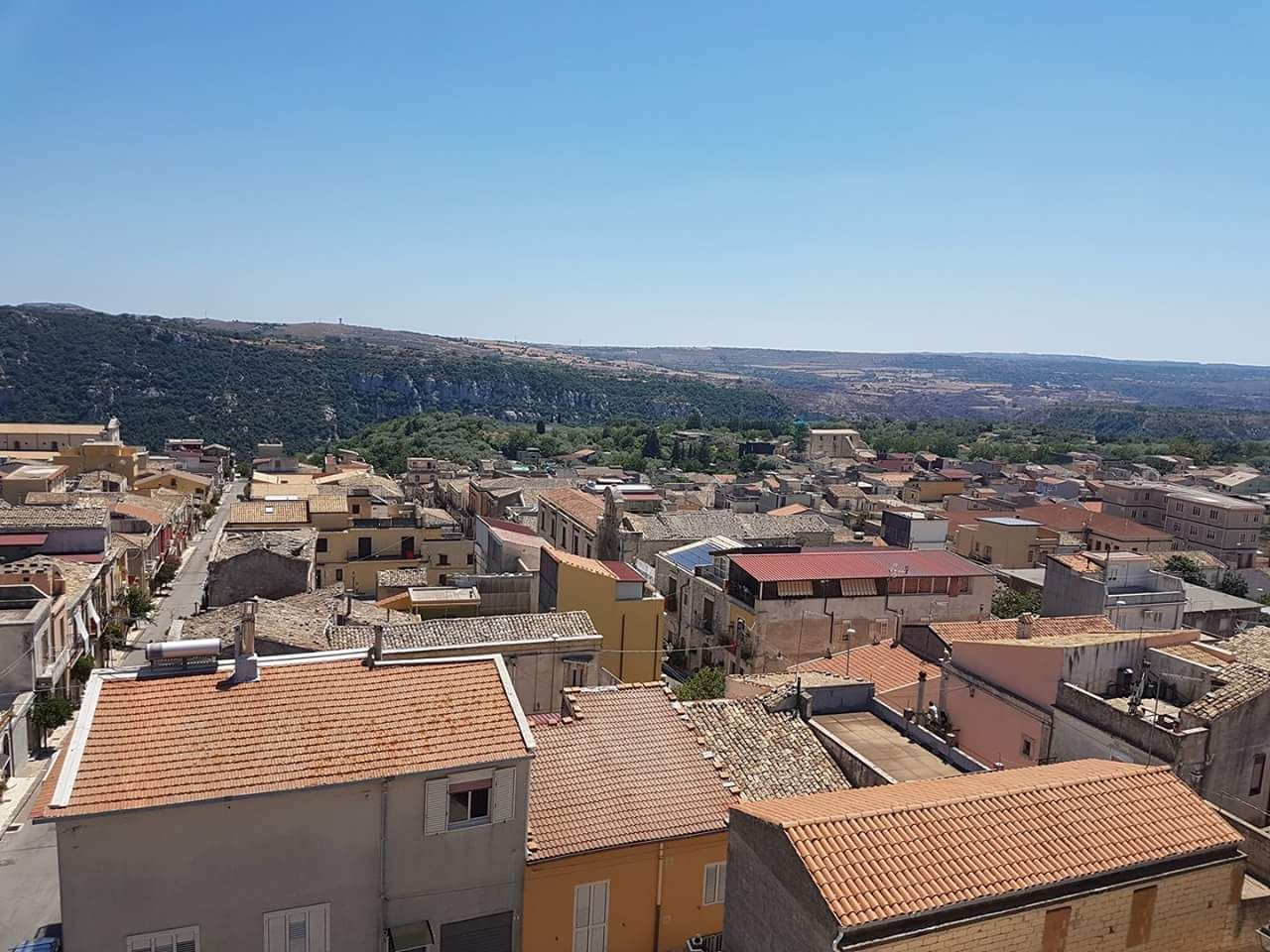

- Location within Italy Location within Sicily
- Coordinates: 37°6′N 14°57′E
- Country: Italy
- Region: Sicily
- Province: Syracuse (SR)

Government
  - Mayor: Mirella Garro

Area
  - Total: 19.62 km^{2} (7.58 sq mi)
- Elevation: 560 m (1,840 ft)

Population (30 November 2017)
  - Total: 780
  - Density: 40/km^{2} (100/sq mi)
- Time zone: UTC+1 (CET)
  - Summer (DST): UTC+2 (CEST)
- Patron saint: St. Joseph
- Saint day: Last Sunday in July
- Website: Official website

Cassaro (Italian: [ˈkassaro]; Sicilian: U Càssaru, locally U Càssuru) is a town and comune (municipality) in the Province of Syracuse, in the Italian region of Sicily. Cassaro has 859 inhabitants.

== Etymology ==
The name of Cassaro probably derives from the Latin word castrum, meaning 'castle', 'fort' or 'military camp', 'castle'. This designation was subsequently influenced by the Arabic word qaṣr (قصر), reflecting the historical layers of the region's linguistic and cultural development.

== Geography ==
Situated in the southeastern portion of the island, Cassaro is positioned approximately 35 kilometres (22 mi) west of the provincial capital, Siracusa, and roughly 52 kilometres (32 mi) from the city of Ragusa. The town's location within the Hyblaean Mountains contributes to its distinctive landscape and historical importance.

== History ==
According to Barberi's Capibrevi, in the Middle Ages the town belonged to the Spadafora family. Margherita Moleti Spadafora married Baron Pietro Siracusa, who belonged to one of the oldest families in the town of Noto and was also Baron of Monastero and Xiridia. The Siracusa dynasty (formerly known as Zaragoza) is of Spanish origin, documented in Sicily since 1283. Members of this Family has been also the lords of Collesano, counts of Villalta and dukes of Casteldimirto. Records are in the State Archive of Palermo (Fondo Protonotaro). Beatrice Siracusa, the only daughter of the above-mentioned Pietro and Margherita Siracusa (who are also ancestors of Queen Paola of Belgium) married Pietro Gaetani, Baron of Sortino. Beatrice died with her son Guido during the earthquake of 1452. Their possessions passed to her son Cesare, ancestor of the actual Princes of Cassaro. The current princess is Sara Tononi.

== Main sights ==
Sights in Cassaro include the Mother Church, dedicated to Saint Peter (started in the 17th century and ended in 1730), and the Church of Saint Anthony the Abbot (17th-18th century).

=== Traditions and folklore ===
- Palm Sunday (food and entertainment stands with street artists and living representations of the Passion of Christ)
- Easter festivities:
  - Good Friday: Scisa 'â cruci and procession of the Addolorata
  - Holy Saturday: procession of the Madonna in search of her Son
- A risùscita
- Easter Sunday: U Scontru
- Feast of the patron saint (last Sunday of July, alternating between Saint Joseph, Saint Sebastian, and Saint Anthony)
- Epiphany: "The three kings" (food stands and living nativity scene with the arrival of the magi on horseback)
