= List of bridges in Bahrain =

== Major road and railway bridges ==
This table presents a non-exhaustive list of the road and railway bridges with spans greater than 100 metres (328 ft) or total lengths longer than 5,000 metres (16,404 ft).

	Name	Arabic	Span	Length	Type	Carries Crosses	Opened	Location	Governorate	Ref.
1	King Fahd Causeway	جسر الملك فهد	150 m (490 ft)	25,000 m (82,000 ft)	Box girder Prestressed concrete 80+150+80; Beam bridge Prestressed concrete	King Fahd Causeway; Gulf of Bahrain	1986	Jasra–Khobar; 26°12′07.5″N 50°17′12.3″E	Northern Governorate; Saudi Arabia	(Note: The causeway is composed of bridges, dykes and artificial islands, the lengths of the bridges numbered from 1 to 5 are respectively 934, 2,034, 5,194, 3,334 and 934 metres (3,064, 6,673, 17,041, 10,938 and 3,064 ft) totaling 12,430 metres (40,780 ft).)
2	Sheikh Khalifa bin Salman Bridge	جسر الشيخ خليفة بن سلمان	121 m (397 ft)	404 m (1,325 ft)	Arch; Steel tied arch	Sheikh Khalifa bin Salman Causeway; Manama harbour	2003	Manama–Al Hidd; 26°13′9″N 50°37′37″E	Capital Governorate; Muharraq Governorate	
3	Second Manama-Muharraq Crossing	جسر الشيخ عيسى بن سلمان	120 m (390 ft)		Cable-stayed; Concrete box girder deck, concrete pylons and cable-stays	Shaikh Isa Causeway; Manama harbour	1997	Manama–Muharraq; 26°15′13″N 50°35′36″E	Capital Governorate; Muharraq Governorate	
4	P-954 Flyover Bridge		122 m (400 ft)		Arch; Steel tied arch Bow-string bridge	Road Bridge; Sheikh Khalifa bin Salman Causeway	2014	Manama; 26°12′26.8″N 50°36′51.5″E	Capital Governorate	
5	Qatar–Bahrain Causeway project	جسر المحبة		40,000 m (130,000 ft)	Rail-road bridge	Qatar–Bahrain Causeway; Railway line Gulf of Bahrain		Askar–Zubarah; 26°02′05.0″N 50°49′35.6″E	Southern Governorate; Qatar	(Note: Like the King Fahd Causeway, the Qatar–Bahrain Causeway includes 18 km (11 mi) of artificial dikes and 22 km (14 mi) of viaducts and bridges. Different designs were proposed for the main channel, two 225 m (738 ft) span cable-stayed bridges, or an arch bridge with a 250 m (820 ft) main span.)
6	King Hamad Causeway project	جسر الملك حمد		25,000 m (82,000 ft)		Road bridge Gulf Railway; Gulf of Bahrain		Budaiya–Khobar; 26°14′36.2″N 50°20′06.8″E	Northern Governorate; Saudi Arabia	

== See also ==
- Transport in Bahrain
- Arab Mashreq International Road Network
- Geography of Bahrain

== Notes and references ==
- Notes
- Nicolas Janberg. "International Database for Civil and Structural Engineering". Structurae.com.
- Others references
