= List of bridges in Saudi Arabia =

The Kingdom of Saudi Arabia had approximately 6,000 bridges structures in 13 regions.

== Major road and railway bridges ==
This table presents a non-exhaustive list of the road and railway bridges with spans greater than 100 metres (328 ft) or total lengths longer than 5,000 metres (16,404 ft).

Image		Name	Arabic	Span	Length	Type	Carries Crosses	Opened	Location	Province	Ref.
	1	Wadi Leban Bridge	جسر المعلق بالرياض	405 m (1,329 ft)	763 m (2,503 ft)	Cable-stayed; Concrete box girder deck, concrete pylons 179+405+179	City road 500; Western Ring Road; Wadi Leban Valley	1997	Riyadh; 24°36′57.2″N 46°34′59.2″E	Riyadh Province	
	2	Saudi Landbridge Bridge project		300 m (980 ft)		Arch; Concrete deck arch	Saudi Landbridge Project				
	3	Obhur Creek Bridge project		200 m (660 ft)	2,000 m (6,600 ft)	Arch; Concrete through arch	Road bridge Jeddah Metro (Line 2 ) Obhur Creek		Jeddah; 21°43′21.1″N 39°06′46.2″E	Mecca Province	
	4	King Fahd Causeway	جسر الملك فهد	150 m (490 ft)	25,000 m (82,000 ft)	Box girder Prestressed concrete 80+150+80; Beam bridge Prestressed concrete	King Fahd Causeway; Gulf of Bahrain	1986	Khobar–Jasra; 26°12′07.5″N 50°17′12.3″E	Eastern Province; Bahrain	(Note: The causeway is composed of bridges, dykes and artificial islands, the lengths of the bridges numbered from 1 to 5 are respectively 934, 2,034, 5,194, 3,334 and 934 metres (3,064, 6,673, 17,041, 10,938 and 3,064 ft) totaling 12,430 metres (40,780 ft).)
	5	Takhassusi Bridge		106 m (348 ft)	505 m (1,657 ft)	Box girder Prestressed concrete 60+106+60	Road bridge Takhassusi Road; Makkah road		Riyadh; 24°40′31.5″N 46°40′41.7″E	Riyadh Province	
	6	King Hamad Causeway project	جسر الملك حمد		25,000 m (82,000 ft)		Road bridge Gulf Railway; Gulf of Bahrain		Khobar–Budaiya; 26°14′36.2″N 50°20′06.8″E	Eastern Province; Bahrain	
	7	Saudi–Egypt Causeway project	مشروع جسر بري بين مصر والسعودية		9,000 m (30,000 ft)		Road bridge Straits of Tiran; Gulf of Aqaba		Ras Alsheikh Hamid–Sharm El Sheikh; 27°59′56.0″N 34°28′18.2″E	Tabuk Province; Egypt	
	8	West Viaduct (Riyadh Metro Line 3)				Box girder Prestressed concrete	Riyadh Metro (Line 3 )		Riyadh; 24°36′01.9″N 46°38′37.9″E	Riyadh Province	
	9	Viaduct 6-1 (Riyadh Metro Line 6)				Box girder Prestressed concrete	Riyadh Metro (Line 6 )		Riyadh; 24°44′18.0″N 46°48′00.4″E	Riyadh Province	

== See also ==
- Transport in Saudi Arabia
- Arab Mashreq International Road Network
- Rail transport in Saudi Arabia
- Geography of Saudi Arabia
- List of rivers of Saudi Arabia

== Notes and references ==
- Notes
- Nicolas Janberg. "International Database for Civil and Structural Engineering". Structurae.com.
- Others references
