= List of controlled-access highway systems =

Many countries have national networks of controlled-access highways, the names of which vary from one country to another e.g. freeway or motorway. The networks do not always include all such highways, or even all the major ones in the country.

== Asia ==
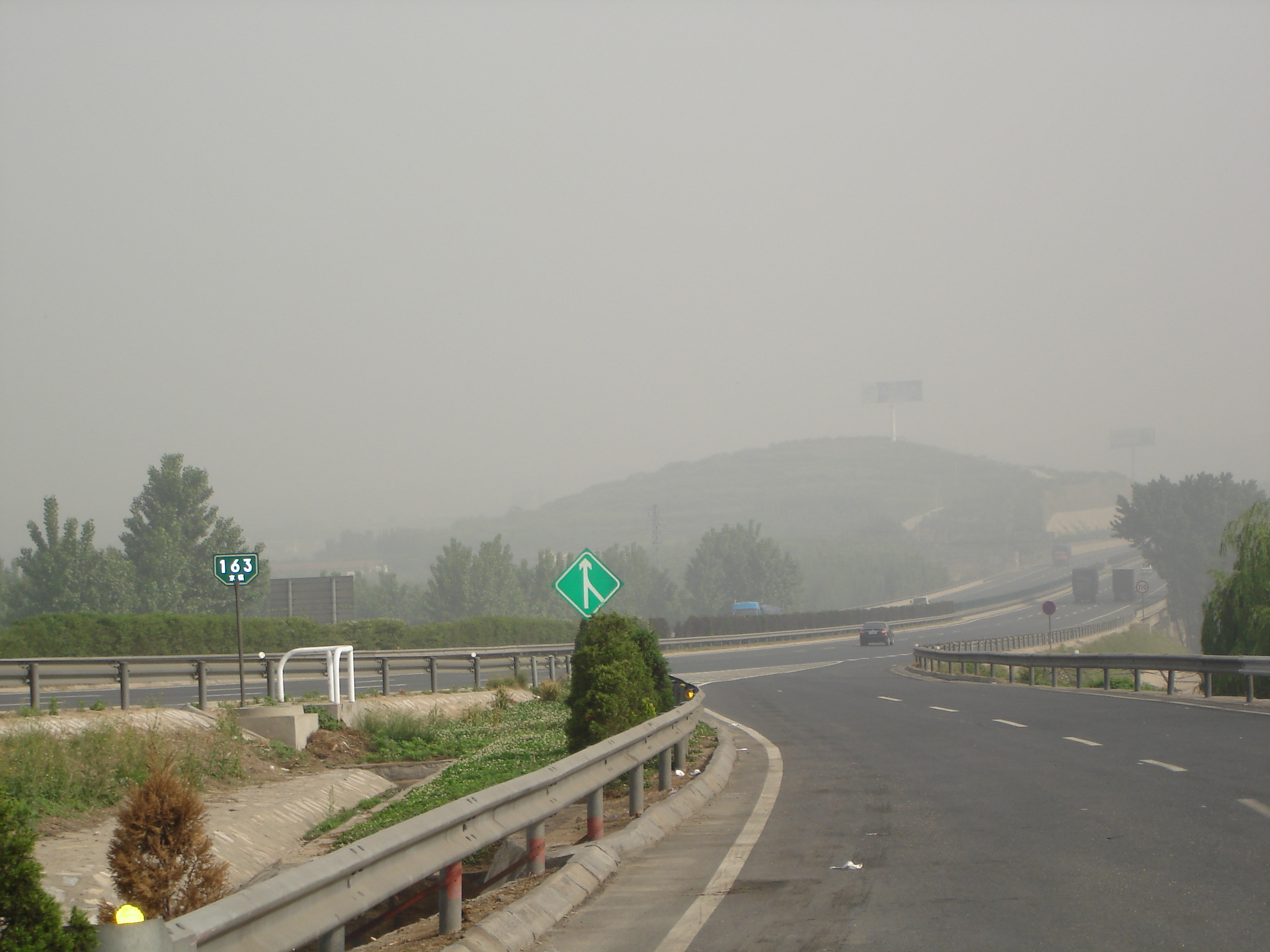
The Jinghu Expressway, connecting Beijing and Shanghai in the People's Republic of China.

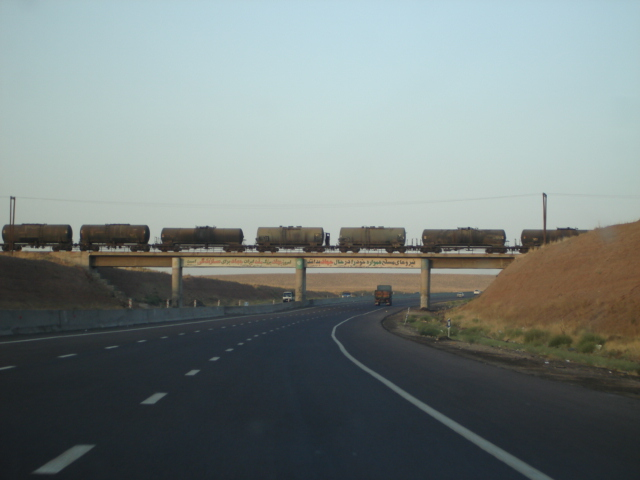
Motorway 5, connecting Tehran and Bandar Imam in Iran.

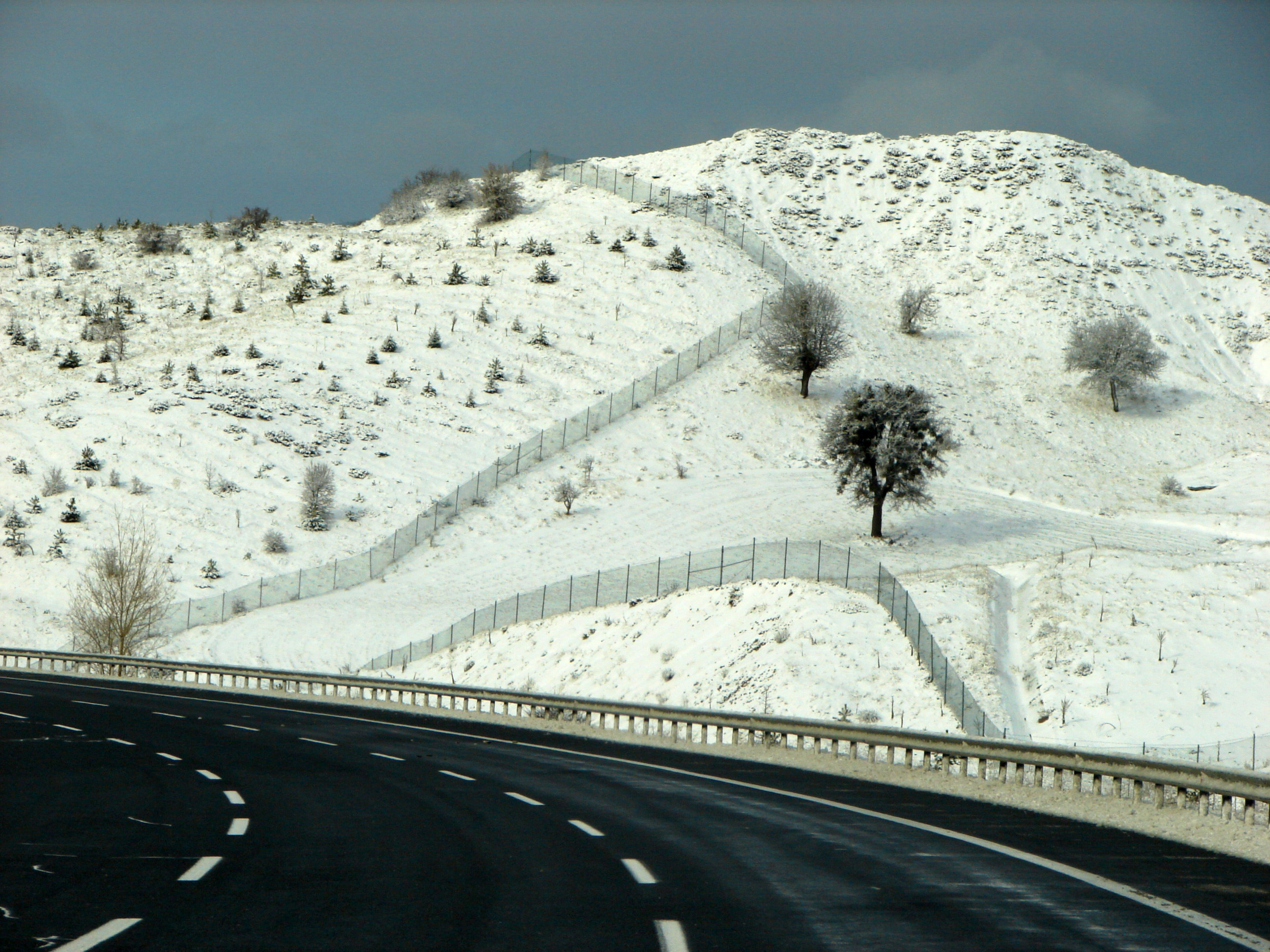
Ankara-Istanbul Highway, Motorway 4 in Turkey.

- Bahrain: ṭarīq siyār (طريق سيار)
- Brunei: Lebuhraya
- China: Gaosu Gōnglù (高速公路)
- Hong Kong: Expressways (快速公路）
- India: Expressways
- Indonesia: Toll Road/Jalan Tol (all tolled)
- Iran: Āzādrāh (آزادراه)
- Iraq: ṭarīq siyār (طريق سيار)
- Israel: kvish mahir (כביש מהיר)
- Japan: Kōsokudōro (高速道路)
- Jordan: ṭarīq siyār (طريق سيار)
- Kazakhstan: Avtomagistral (Автомагистраль)
- Kuwait: ṭarīq siyār (طريق سيار)
- Lebanon: Autoroutes
- Malaysia: Lebuhraya (all tolled)
- Myanmar: Expressway (အမြန်လမ်း) (all tolled)
- North Korea: Kosokdoro (고속도로)
- Oman: ṭarīq siyār (طريق سيار)
- Pakistan: Motorways/Maḥrak rāst (محرک راست)
- Philippines: Expressways (all tolled)
- Qatar: ṭarīq siyār (طريق سيار)
- Saudi Arabia: ṭarīq siyār (طريق سيار)
- Singapore: Expressways (all tolled)
- South Korea: Gosokdoro (고속도로)
- Sri Lanka: Expressways (all tolled)
- Syria: ṭarīq siyār (طريق سيار)
- Taiwan: Gaosu Gōnglù (高速公路)
- Thailand: Thangluang phiset (ทางหลวงพิเศษ)
- United Arab Emirates: ṭarīq siyār (طريق سيار)
- Vietnam: Đường cao tốc

== Europe ==
- International E-road network (Note: not all E-roads are limited access with no at-grade intersections)

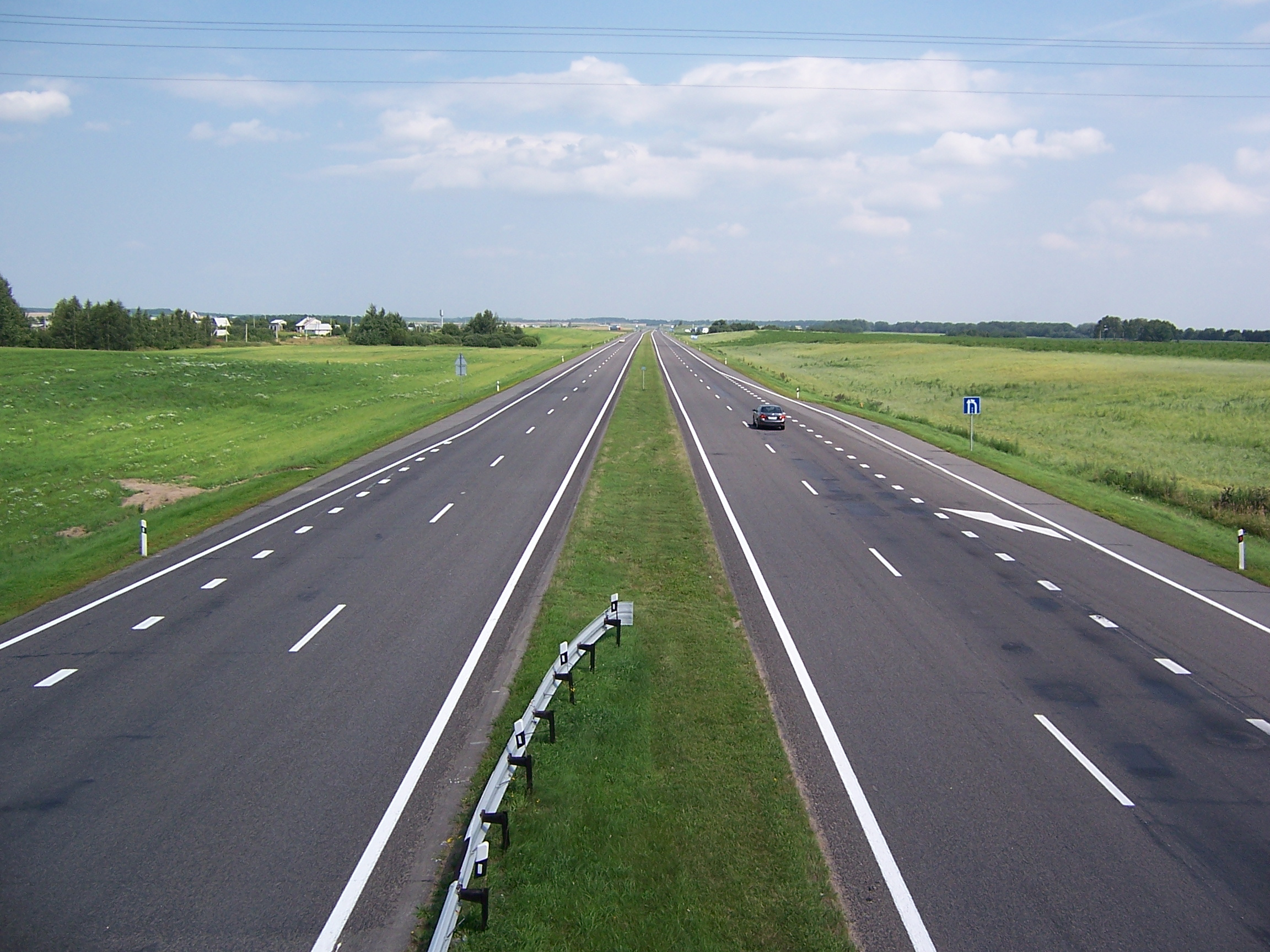
The M1 highway running through Belarus

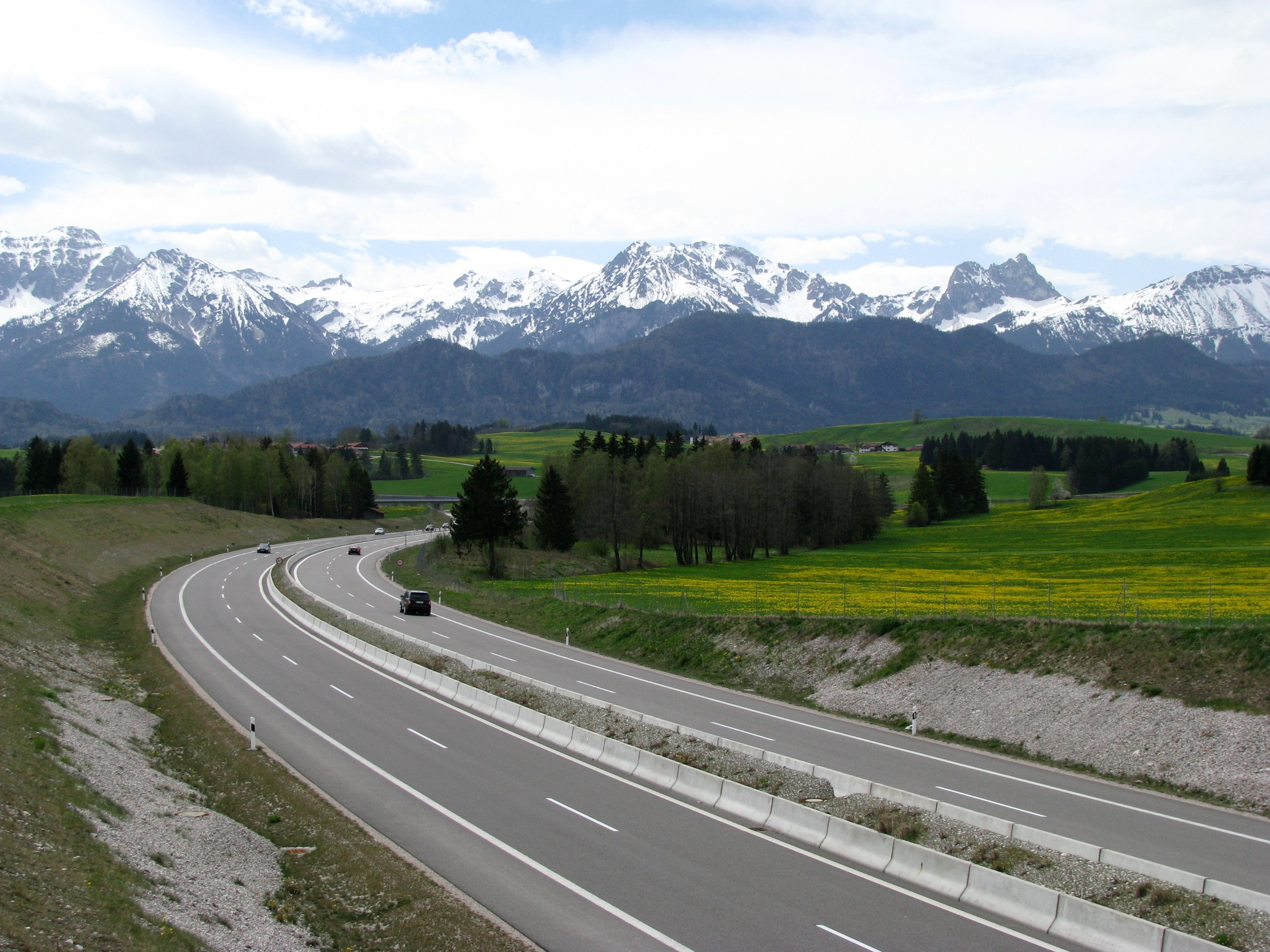
Bundesautobahn 7 near Füssen, in Southern Bavaria, Germany.

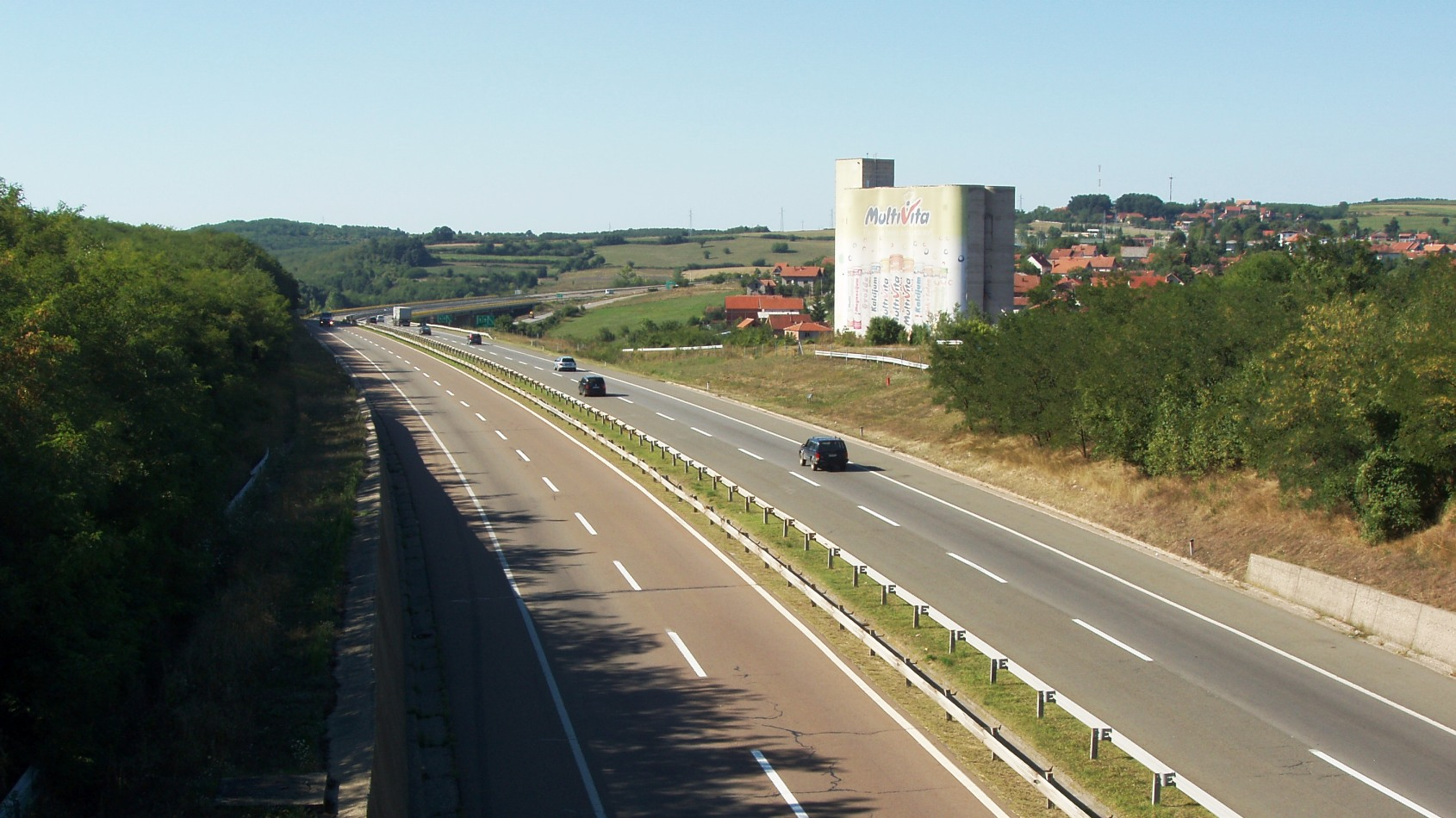
A1 motorway crossing Serbia, connecting the border to Hungary in the north, with the city of Niš to the south. The tracts connects to the border with North Macedonia.

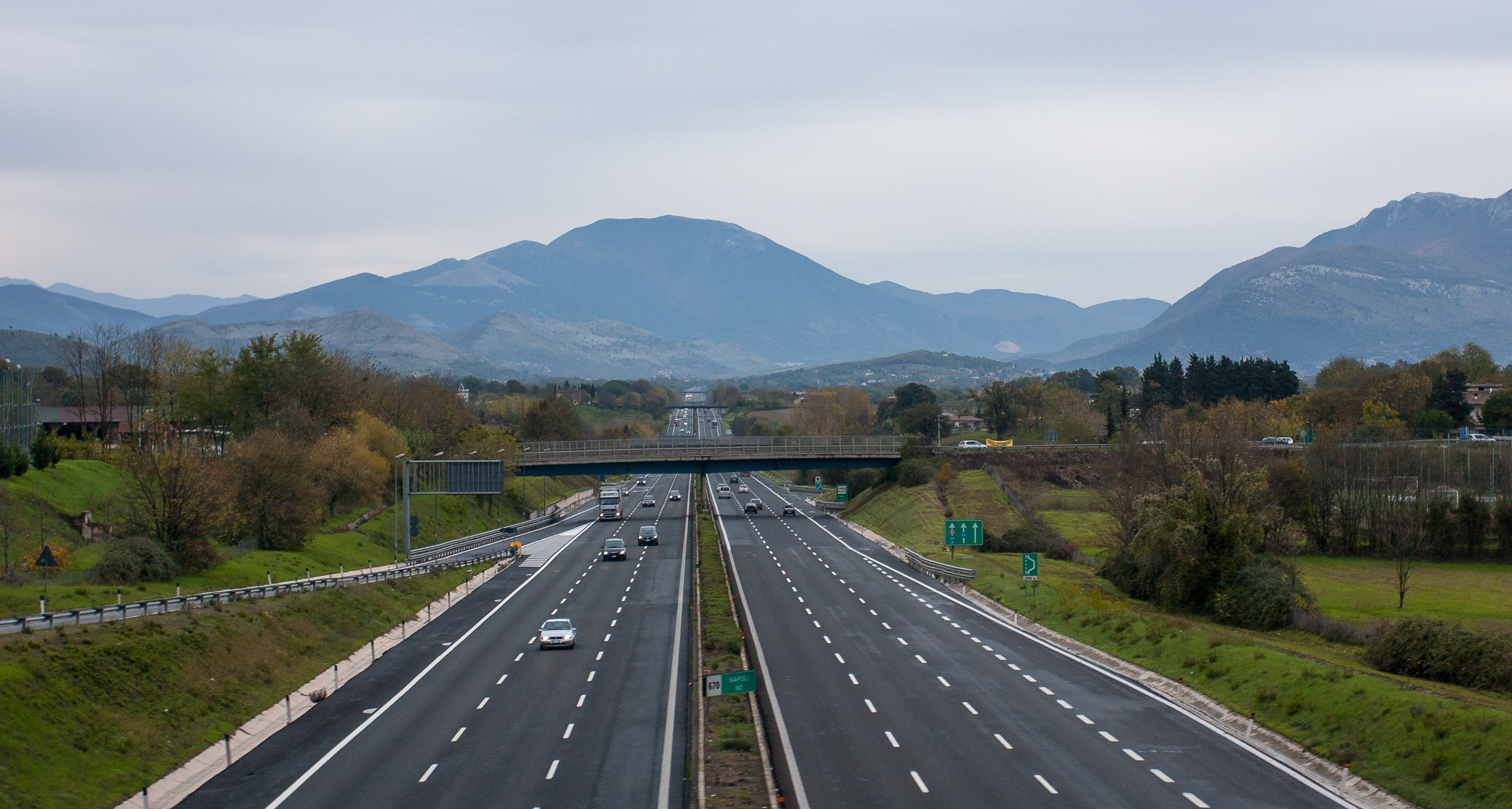
The Autostrada A1 runs through Italy linking some of the largest cities of the country: Milan, Bologna, Florence, Rome and Naples

- Albania: Autostradë
- Armenia: Avtomayughri (ավտոմայրուղի)
- Austria: Autobahnen
- Azerbaijan: Avtoyol
- Belarus: Mahistral' (Магістраль)
- Belgium: Autosnelwegen/Autoroutes/Autobahnen
- Bosnia and Herzegovina: Autocesta/Autoput
- Bulgaria: Avtomagistrala (автомагистрала)
- Croatia: Autocesta
- Czech Republic: Dálnice
- Cyprus: Avtokinitódromos (Αυτοκινητόδρομος)
- Denmark: Motorvej
- Estonia: Põhimaantee
- Finland: Moottoritiet
- France: Autoroutes
- Georgia: Chkarosnuli avtomagistrali (ჩქაროსნული ავტომაგისტრალი)
- Germany: Autobahnen
- Greece: Avtokinitódromos (Αυτοκινητόδρομος)
- Hungary: Autópálya and Autóút
- Ireland: Motorway/Mótarbhealach
- Italy: Autostrade
- Kosovo: Autostradë
- Latvia: Automaģistrāle
- Lithuania: Automagistralė
- Luxembourg: Autoroutes/Autobahnen
- Moldova: Autostrăzi
- Montenegro: Autoput (Аутопут)
- Netherlands: Autosnelwegen
- North Macedonia: Avtopat (Автопат)
- Norway: Motorvei
- Poland: Autostrady and drogi ekspresowe
- Portugal: Auto-estradas
- Romania: Autostrăzi and Drumuri Expres
- Russia: Avtomagistral (Автомагистраль)
- Serbia: Autoput (Аутопут)
- Slovakia: Diaľnica and rýchlostná cesta
- Slovenia: Avtoceste
- Spain: Autopistas and Autovías
- Sweden: Motorvägar
- Switzerland: Autobahnen/Autoroutes/Autostrade
- Turkey: Otoyol
- Ukraine: Avtomahistral (Автомагістраль)
- United Kingdom: Motorways

== Oceania ==
- Australia: Freeways
- New Zealand: Motorways

== North America ==
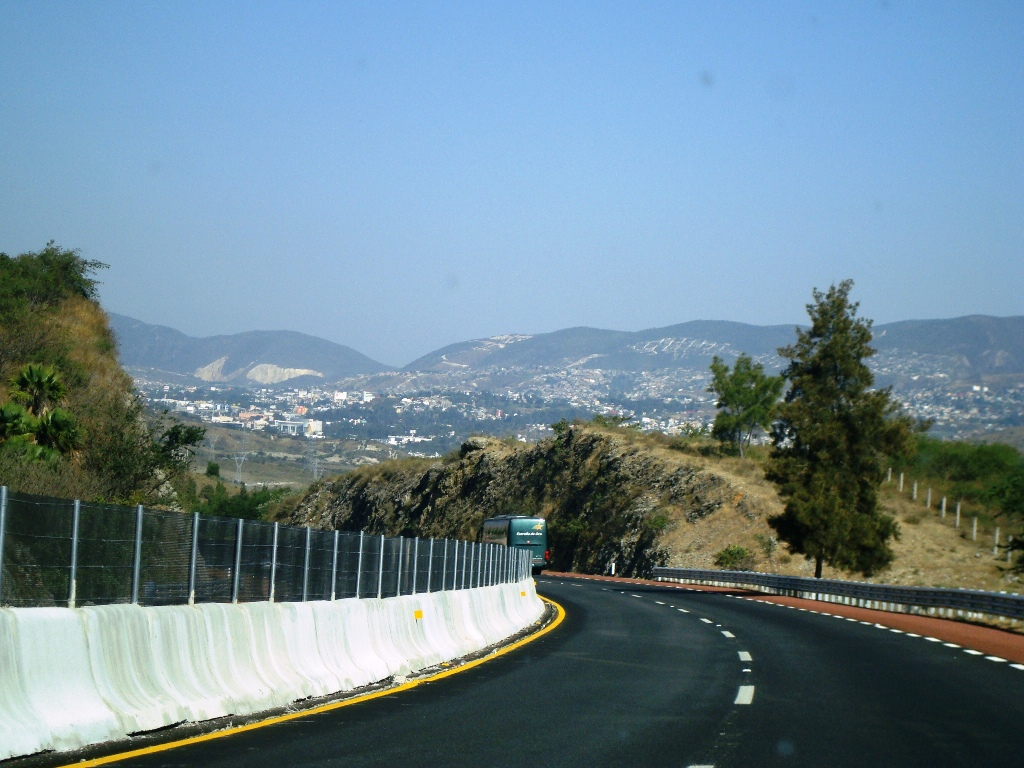
The Mexican Federal Highway 95 passing close to the city of Chilpancingo, in Southern Mexico.

- Costa Rica: Autopistas
- Cuba: Autopistas
- Dominican Republic: Autopistas
- El Salvador: Autopistas
- Guatemala: Autopistas
- Jamaica: Highways
- Martinique: Autoroutes
- Mexico: Autopistas
- Panama: Autopistas
- Trinidad and Tobago: Highways
- United States: Freeways — Interstates are one sub-type of freeways in the U.S.

== South America ==
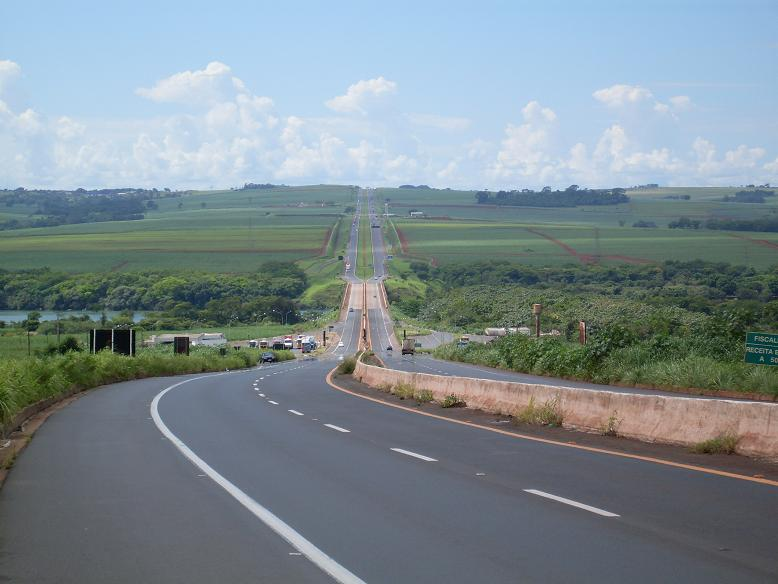
The BR-101 motorway connects Rio de Janeiro and Belo Horizonte in Brazil.

- Argentina: Autopistas
- Bolivia: Autovías
- Brazil: Rodovias
- Chile: Autopistas
- Colombia: Autopistas
- Ecuador: Autopistas
- Peru: Autopistas
- Uruguay: Autopistas
- Venezuela: Autopistas

== Africa ==
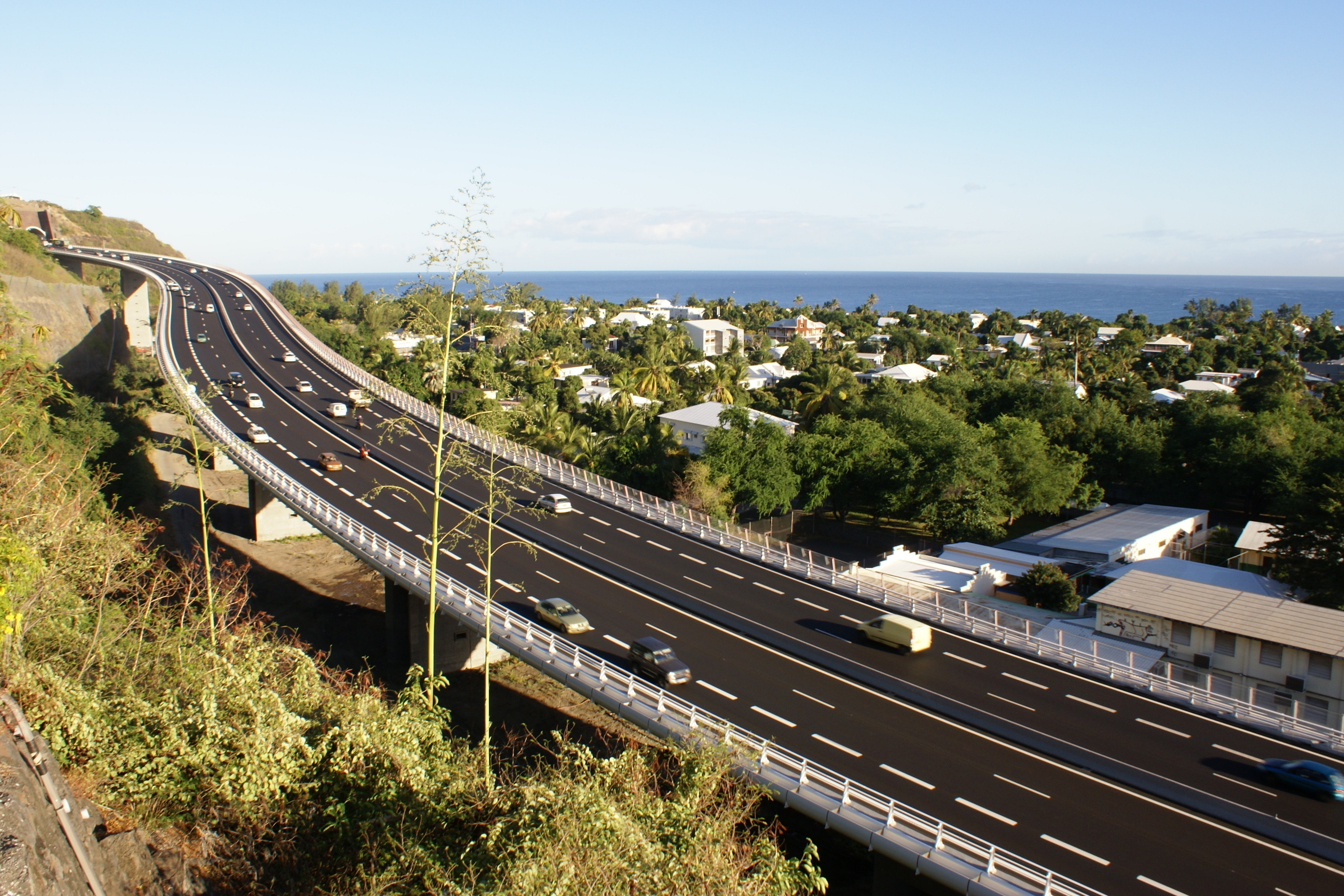
Route Nationale 1 through a viaduct in northern Réunion.

- Algeria: Autoroutes
- Botswana: Motorways
- Cote d'Ivoire: Autoroutes
- Egypt: ṭarīq siyār (طريق سيار)
- Equatorial Guinea: Autovías
- Eswatini: Motorways
- Ethiopia: Motorways
- Mauritius: Motorways/Autoroutes
- Morocco: Autoroutes
- Nigeria: Motorways
- Réunion: Autoroutes
- Senegal: Autoroutes
- South Africa: Autosnelwegen/Motorways
- Tunisia: Autoroutes
