= Qatar–Bahrain Causeway =

Qatar Bahrain Bridge
- Coordinates: 26°1′22″N 50°48′8″E
- Carries: Motor vehicle and Rail
- Crosses: Gulf of Bahrain
- Locale: Bahrain and Qatar
- Other name: Qatar Bahrain Friendship Bridge
- Maintained by: Qatar and Bahrain Causeway Foundation

Characteristics
- Total length: 40 km (25 mi)

Location
- Interactive map of Qatar Bahrain Bridge

The Qatar Bahrain Causeway (also referred to as the Qatar Bahrain Friendship Bridge) is a planned causeway between the two Arab states of Qatar and Bahrain. It was also expected that a ferry service would be established between the two countries in 2017.

Due to the Qatar diplomatic crisis and Bahrain's siding with Saudi Arabia, plans to construct the bridge had stalled. That crisis was resolved in 2021 with the re-establishment of diplomatic trade and transportation ties. On 17 November 2023 during a meeting between King of Bahrain Hamad bin Isa al-Khalifa and Prime Minister of Qatar Sheikh Mohammed bin Abdulrahman al-Thani, the plan for the bridge recommenced and they ordered administrations of both countries to realise the project.

== History ==
It was announced on 13 December 2008 that construction would start in early 2009, and would cost approximately US$2.3 billion to complete. As of June 2015, construction had not started, and the Qatar–Bahrain Causeway project was on hold, while the contracting consortium involved with the project was said to be demobilising, according to a source at the Qatar Bahrain Causeway Foundation (QBCF). On 14 January 2011, Bahrain's Foreign Minister stated that the project should nevertheless be considered as a must for both countries: "This is one economic market, one economic zone that should be well-connected, and the bridge is an integral part of that". On 27 April 2011, an announcement was made, quoting an anonymous source of Bahrain's Al Wasat newspaper, that construction of the causeway would start in 2011 for completion in 2015, at the cost of approximately $5 billion. By December 2012, Bahrain's Foreign Minister was invoking financial turbulence to say that the bridge construction would only be completed by "a little before the 2022 FIFA World Cup."

== Overview ==
Map of Qatar and Bahrain (island in top left).

The link between the two countries would be approximately 40 km (25 mi) in length, and support both a road and a railway. The link was expected to consist of a number of bridges and be a natural extension of the King Fahd Causeway that connects Bahrain and Saudi Arabia, thus linking the entire region. These links include 18 km (11 mi) of artificial dikes and 22 km (14 mi) of viaducts and bridges. These bridges would be 40 m (131 ft) in height at places to allow maritime navigation. The eastern-end of the causeway in Qatar would be located at Ras Eshairij, 5 km (3 mi) South of the city of Zubarah. The opposite end of the causeway would link North of Askar in the Kingdom of Bahrain. Plans for its construction were first made in September 2001, when the Danish consultancy COWI signed a DKK 60 million contract for the first phase of the project with the Ministry of Municipal Affairs and Agriculture in Qatar. Together with Sund & Bælt Partner Ltd., DHI Water & Environment and the architects of Dissing Weitling and COWI conducted pre-studies of the link.

== Milestones ==
The project was reportedly approved for construction on 28 February 2005, to link Bahrain near Manama to northwest Qatar near Zubarah as the longest fixed link in the world. A formal agreement between the two countries was signed on 11 June 2006 to form a company that would raise the necessary capital and initiate construction.

It was announced on 30 September 2007 that construction should start within seven months and last 48 months. A memorandum of understanding to that effect was then signed between the Qatar and Bahrain Causeway Foundation and a consortium of companies led by French construction major Vinci Construction and the French bridge Architects LAVIGNE Cheron and the German Company Hochtief Construction AG, CCC and Qatari Diar Real Estate Investment Company.

On 15 November 2008, the Qatar–Bahrain Causeway Foundation awarded a contract to KBR, an engineering company headquartered in Houston, "to provide design, project and construction management services for the Qatar-Bahrain road and rail marine crossing".

In 2009, discussions were entered into to soften the gradient of the bridge to make it more suitable for rail traffic. French architects Thomas Lavigne and Christophe Cheron joined the consortium led by Vinci to design, in collaboration with the engineers, the Causeway and the two main bridges.

In May 2010, Qatari coastguards injured a Bahraini fisherman reigniting a dispute over the Hawar Islands. Escalating costs and the subsequent diplomatic row helped place the project on the back burner.

In November 2023, the causeway project was discussed during a meeting in Manama between Qatar’s Prime Minister and Minister of Foreign Affairs Sheikh Mohammed bin Abdulrahman Al Thani and Bahrain’s Crown Prince.

On February 22, 2024, it has been announced that the proposed land border crossing between Bahrain and Qatar has received a fresh boost as officials from two sides have agreed to restructure the board of the project as part of its implementation. This was discussed during the fourth meeting of the Bahrain-Qatari Follow-up Committee held in Manama.

== See also ==
- List of bridges in Bahrain
- List of longest bridges in the world
- List of international bridges
- Transport in Bahrain
- Transport in Qatar
- Bahrain light rail network
- King Hamad Causeway
