= VSL International =

Swiss construction company

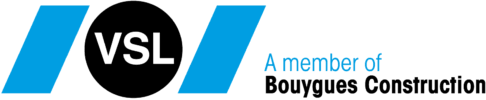
- Industry: Construction
- Founded: 1954
- Headquarters: Bern, Switzerland
- Areas served: Worldwide
- Key people: Jean-Yves Mondon (CEO)
- Services: Post-tensioning; Stay cables Heavy lifting Foundations and ground engineering Civil works (bridges and containment structures); Buildings; Repairs
- Owner: Bouygues
- Number of employees: 4,000
- Website: vsl.com

VSL International (for Vorspann System Losinger) is a specialist construction company founded in 1954. VSL contributes to engineering, building, repairing, upgrading and preserving transport infrastructure (bridges, tunnels, retained earth walls for roads), buildings and energy production facilities. Based in Switzerland, VSL is owned by French construction company Bouygues.

VSL specialises in post-tensioned concrete, stay-cable systems and heavy lifting, while its subsidiary Intrafor focuses on ground engineering and foundations. The company has also developed its proprietary systems, mostly related to post-tensioning and stay-cable, and has 370 patents.

== History ==
In 1943, the Swiss construction company Losinger started to build post-tensioned bridges and began the development of its own post-tensioning system.

The patent of this wire-based system was registered in 1954 and Vorspann System Losinger was created to help develop this activity. The patent was first applied in 1956 for the construction of the Pont des Cygnes bridge in Yverdon, Switzerland.

In 1966, VSL launched its strand post-tensioning system. In 1978, VSL's stay cable system was installed for the first time on the Liebrüti bridge in Kaiseraugst, Switzerland.

While the company developed internationally from the 1970s, in 1991, VSL joined the Bouygues group following the purchase of Losinger.

In 2001, VSL diversified its activity to ground engineering.

== Organization ==
VSL is headquartered in Bern in Switzerland, where the company was founded. In 2015, Jean-Yves Mondon was appointed chief executive officer. VSL operates in more than 30 countries, mostly in Asia, Oceania, the Middle East, Europe and South America.

== Key figures ==
- Workforce: 4,000 employees
- Patents: 370
- 3 manufacturing plants (in China, Spain and Thailand)
- 6 technical centre with offices in Switzerland, Singapore, Hong Kong, Spain, Thailand and Dubai

== Activities ==
VSL's activities are organized in 4 business lines to engineer, build, repair, upgrade and preserve transport infrastructure (bridges, tunnels, retained earth walls for roads), buildings and energy production facilities:

- Systems and technologies: post-tensioning systems, stay cables, damping systems for buildings and civil works, bearings and joints.
- Construction: bridges, buildings, containment structures, offshore structures, heavy lifting.
- Ground engineering: foundations, ground improvement, ground investigation, mechanically stabilised earth walls, ground anchors.
- Repair, strengthening and preservation, including structural diagnostic, upgrade and retrofitting (de-icing, fire protection…) and monitoring.

== Projects ==
Among the most important projects VSL has carried out or taken a part in are:

- Ganter Bridge, in Valais, Switzerland (1980)
- Tsing Ma Bridge, Hong Kong (1994)
- Petronas Towers's sky bridge, in Kuala Lumpur, Malaysia (1995)
- Burj Al Arab hotel (1997)
- Stadium Australia, in Sydney, Australia (1998)
- Dubai Metro, UAE (2006)
- Venitian Macao resort hotel, China (2007)
- Second Gateway Bridge / Gateway Bridge duplication, in Brisbane, Australia (2010)
- Marina Bay Sands, Singapore (2010)
- Hodariyat Bridge, in Abu Dhabi, United Arab Emirates (2012)
- Baluarte Bridge, Mexico (2012) the highest cable-stayed bridge in the world
- Newmarket Viaduct replacement, in Auckland, New Zealand (2012)
- Queensferry Crossing, United Kingdom (2017)
- Bandra–Worli Sea Link, Mumbai, India (2009)
- Cable-stayed bridge on the Mumbai Metro, India (2012)
- Ho Chi Minh City Metro Line 1, Vietnam (2017)

Other known projects include:

- The Dubai Mall, the world's largest shopping mall
- Incheon Bridge, South Korea
- Kai Tak Cruise Terminal, Hong Kong
- Nhật Tân Bridge, Vietnam
- Rạch Miễu Bridge, Vietnam
- Stonecutters Bridge, Hong Kong
- Tarban Creek Bridge, Australia
- Wadi Leban Bridge, Saudi Arabia

VSL also provided heavy lifting (with hydraulic jacks) for fifteen segments of the CMS detector of the Large Hadron Collider.

== See also ==
- Category:Cable-stayed bridges
