= Nouvelle route du Littoral =

Road under construction in Réunion

- NRL
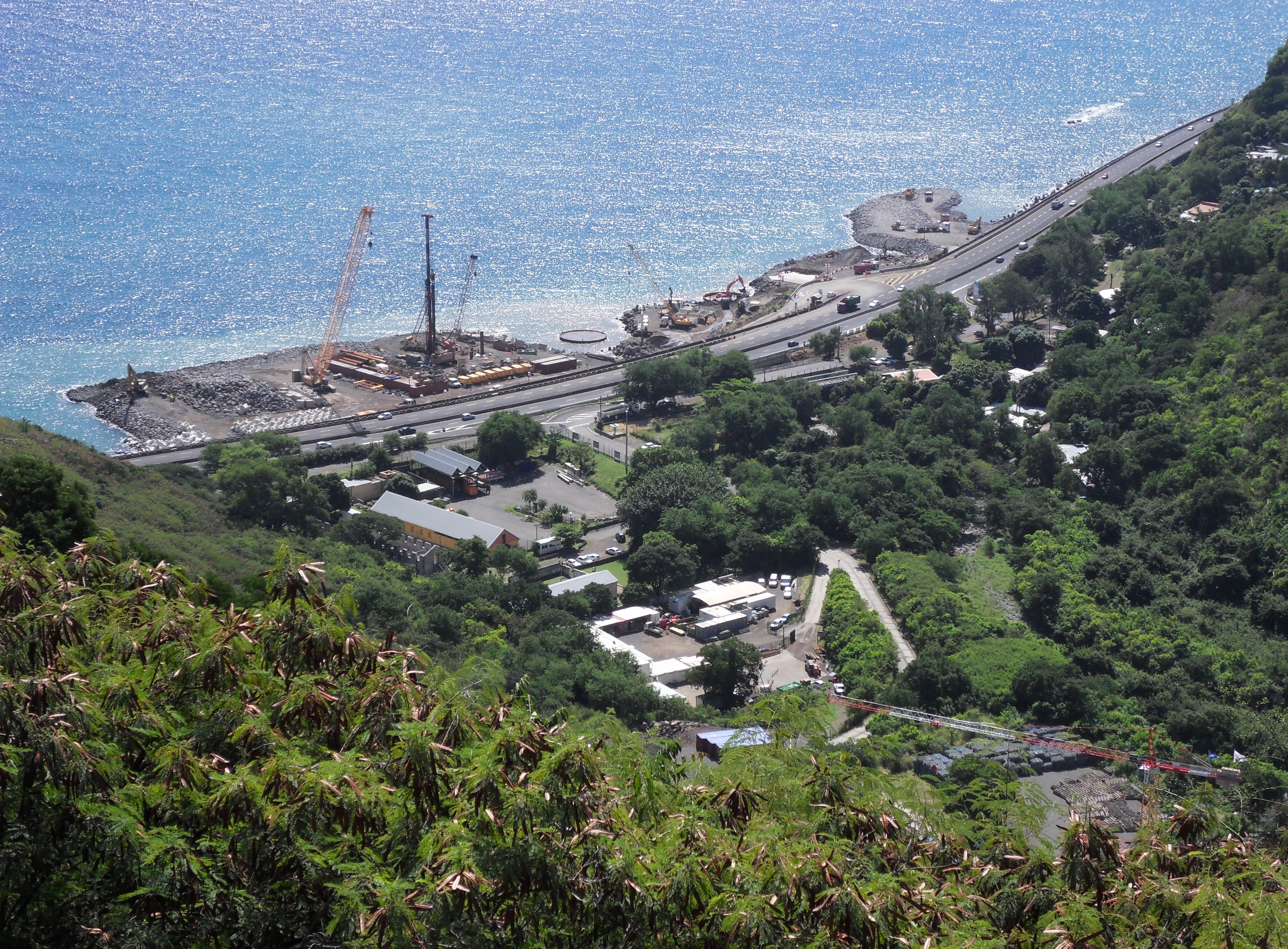
- The Grande Chaloupe viaduct under construction in May 2015.

Route information
- Length: 12.5 km (7.8 mi)
- Existed: Partial (southbound) : 28 August 2022–present

Major junctions
- East end: Saint-Denis
- South-east end: La Possession

Location
- Country: France
- Overseas region: Réunion
- Department: La Réunion

Highway system
- Transport in Réunion

The Nouvelle route du Littoral transl. "New Coastal Road" or NRL is a project to reroute National route 1 from the coast to over the ocean in Réunion, a French overseas department in the south-west Indian Ocean. Built on viaducts and a causeway, the road will pass over the sea for around 12 kilometres (7.5 mi) and eventually link Saint-Denis to La Possession, replacing the current route du Littoral, which is too exposed to rockfalls from the cliff at the foot of which it is located and to heavy waves. This project has faced technical, ecological and financial challenges, and the awarding of some of the contracts is the subject of a legal inquiry.

== Project ==
The project has been the subject of many studies and many designs, ranging from an entirely viaduct solution over the sea to a causeway doubling the existing road with various intermediate solutions. A tunnel under La Montagne was also studied.

The cost of the project was €1.6 billion (in December 2011), which equates to €130 million per kilometre. This high cost has earnt the NRL the nickname of "the most expensive road in the world"

The project was the subject of an assessment by the Autorité environnementale in October 2011, endorsed by the Minister for the Environment and Sustainable Development, and was also assessed by the Conseil national de la protection de la nature (CNPN).

== Construction ==
In 2019, the supply of rocks for the causeway caused the work to be interrupted. The road requires 3 million tonnes of large boulders, the supply of which requires the opening of quarries at Saint-Leu and Bois-Blanc. Following legal challenges by environmental groups, citing the impact of the quarries, and the impact on the sea cliffs of the proposed causeway portion, the administrative court suspended the opening authorisations in April 2019, asking for a reflection on the departmental plan of the mines.

On 3 April 2020, the Council of State confirmed the suspension of construction. On 20 June, Didier Robert, then president of the Regional Council of Réunion, announced that the project would only be partially completed pending reconsideration of the plans for the project. An agreement between the region and the contractors was reached on 31 July 2020, the terms of which remain to be published.

On 30 March 2021 the viaduct portion between Grande Chaloupe and Saint-Denis was completed, with opening expected for the end of 2021.

In 2021, the incorrect installation of several hundred tetrapods caused additional delays

In mid-February 2022, the new president of the regional council Huguette Bello, announced that the La Possession to Grande Chaloupe section, originally planned as a causeway, was to be built as a viaduct similar to that of the Saint-Denis to Grande Chaloupe section. This is expected to add €500 and €700 million to the cost of the road. Opening is planned seven years after the administrative procedures and preliminary studies, for an estimated opening date around 2029 or 2030. The revised plan consists of a succession of three viaducts, with a causeway only being used for short distances to connect between viaducts. One of the arguments raised for the use of viaducts, rather than a causeway, was based on the effects of the passage of the Cyclone Batsirai at the beginning of February 2022. The cyclone caused waves which partially submerged the existing causeway, requiring it to be closed and emergency repairs were needed prior to reopening. However, the viaduct portion was not impacted by the passage of the cyclone.

On 28 August 2022, the new road was partially opened, in one direction only, on the 8.7 kilometres (5.4 mi) between St Denis and La Grande Chaloupe.

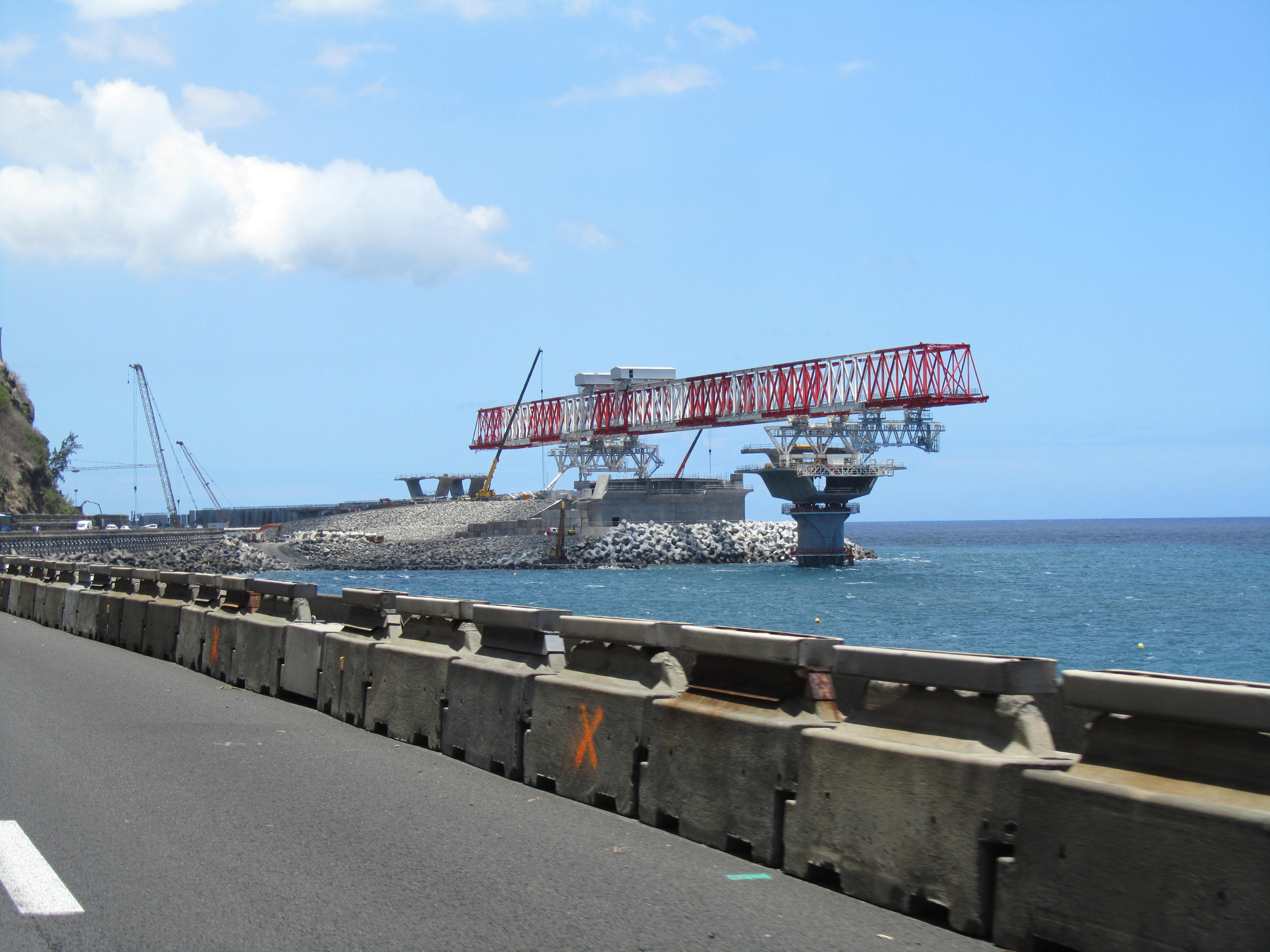
The construction site of the Grande Chaloupe viaduct in November 2016.

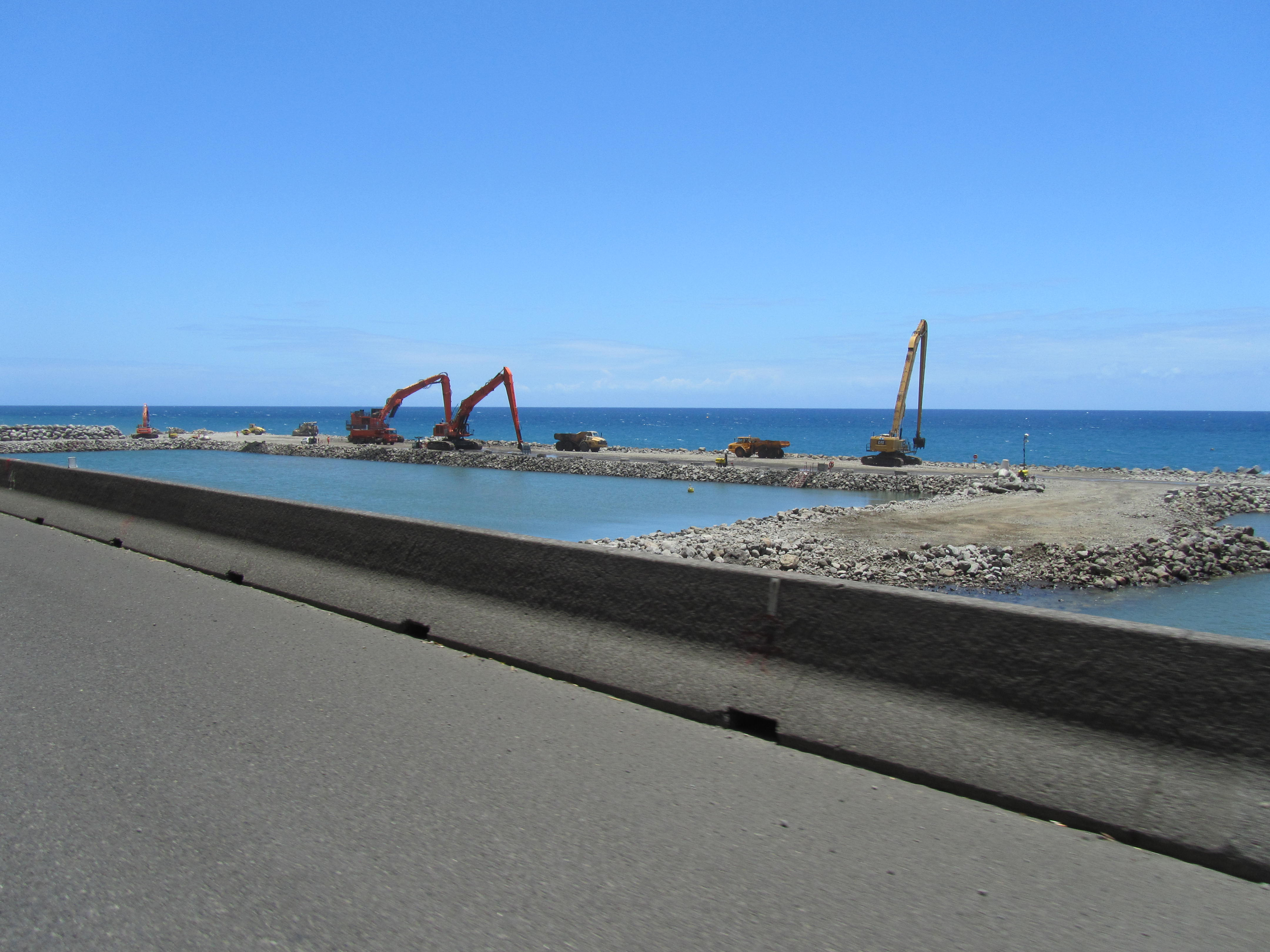
An incomplete causeway portion near Cape Bernard in November 2016.
