= Pointe des Aigrettes =

Coordinates: 21°02′15″S 55°13′00″E

The Pointe des Aigrettes is a headland on the island of Réunion in the Indian Ocean. Located in the commune of Saint-Paul, along the island's western coast, it marks the westernmost point of the territory, and may be found close to the entrance to Saint-Gilles-les-Bains along Route nationale 1.
