= King Hamad Causeway =

- Carries: Motor vehicles Trains
- Crosses: Gulf of Bahrain
- Locale: Bahrain; Saudi Arabia
- Named for: Hamad bin Isa Al Khalifa

Characteristics
- Total length: 25 km (16 mi)

King Hamad Causeway is a proposed causeway to connect Saudi Arabia and Bahrain, running parallel to the existing King Fahd Causeway. The causeway is expected to be about 25 kilometers and allow passenger trains, freight trains and vehicles so as to reduce the traffic on the King Fahd Causeway. It is estimated to cost $5 billion and will be a part of the proposed Gulf Railway.

== History ==
The causeway was first proposed during a meeting between King Hamad bin Isa Al Khalifa of Bahrain and King Abdullah bin Abdulaziz of Saudi Arabia in September 2014 in Jeddah. SNC Lavalin was appointed to undertake a feasibility study for the project.

During a state visit by King Salman bin Abdulaziz to Bahrain in December 2016, the two countries signed an agreement to implement the project. They also agreed to undertake a study to build the causeway. The project will be funded by the private sector.

== See also ==
- List of bridges in Bahrain
- List of bridges in Saudi Arabia
- List of international bridges
