= Route nationale 1 (Réunion) =

Road in Réunion

National road 1
- Route nationale 1

Location
- Country: France
- Overseas region: Réunion
- Department: La Réunion

Highway system
- Transport in Réunion

Route nationale 1 is a major highway on the island of Réunion. It links the communes of Saint-Denis and Saint-Pierre, and passes through all of the communes on the island's west coast. The Pointe des Aigrettes, Réunion's westernmost point, may be found along this road.

The New Coastal Road, or (French: Nouvelle route du Littoral) (NRL), also known as the Route du Littoral (RN1), is a highway under construction since the end of 2013 on the island of Réunion, in the south western Indian Ocean. The road will connect the coastal cities of Saint-Denis and La Possession. This road, known as the world's most expensive road, is very particular because it is built on the sea.

The 12.5 km (7.8 mi) road, comprises three main components:

- a 5.4 km (3.4 mi) viaduct, which is located 70 m (230 ft) offshore and 20–30 m (66–98 ft) above the ocean, between Saint-Denis and La Grande Chaloupe;
- a 3.6 km (2.2 mi) causeway between La Grande Chaloupe and La Possession;
- an interchange at La Possession connecting the causeway to the existing road network.

Carried by a set of viaducts and dykes, this road reclaimed from the sea of a dozen kilometers will eventually link Saint-Denis to La Possession by replacing the current coastal road, too exposed to the scree of the cliff at the foot of which it is located and to cyclonic and southern swells. In doing so, it will constitute part of the national road 1. This project raises many technical, ecological, and financial problems, and the award of some of the contracts is the subject of a judicial investigation.

The cost of the project was funded to the tune of €1.6 billion (base December 2011), or €130 million per kilometer, compared to the €6 million required on average for a kilometer of motorway in the countryside.

RN1 is featured in "A Massive Hunt", the second episode of the fourth series of The Grand Tour.
