= Obhur Creek =

Coordinates: 21.7167°N 39.1167°E

Location
- Country: Saudi Arabia
- Region: 35 km north of Jeddah

Physical characteristics
- Length: 9 km (5.6 mi)

Obhur Creek, or Sharm Abḥur (شرم ابحر, between latitude 21°42'11" and 21°45'24" and longitude 39°05'12" and 39°08'48"E) is a tidal creek located on the eastern side of the Red Sea, near Obhur in Jeddah, Saudi Arabia. It is an old fluvial valley flooded by Red Sea water. The creek is a popular place for Red Sea marinas. The Jeddah Tower, a tower set to be the tallest building in the world at some point, will overlook the creek along with the Red Sea.

== Characteristics ==
The creek has the following characteristics:

- High temperature
- High salinity
- Little fresh water input
- Restricted water exchange with the Red Sea
- Surface water houses abundant plankton
