= Wadi Laban Bridge =

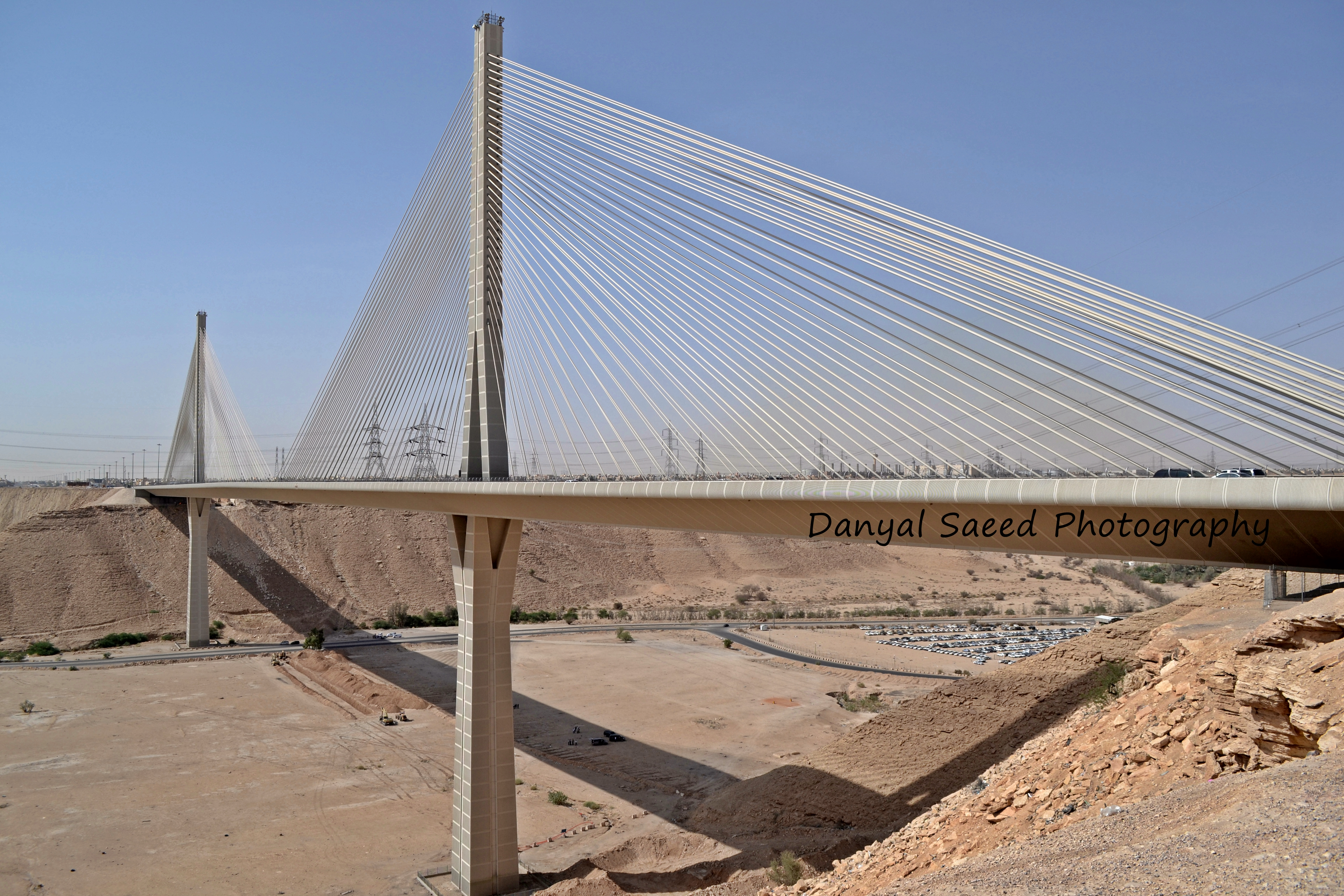
- Wadi Laban Bridge in Riyadh, Saudi Arabia
- Coordinates: 24°36′57″N 46°34′58″E
- Carries: 6 lanes of highway traffic (east and west 500?)
- Locale: Riyadh, Saudi Arabia

Characteristics
- Design: Cable-stayed bridge
- Total length: 763 m (2,503 ft)
- Width: 35.8 m (117 ft)
- Height: 167.5 m (550 ft); 175.5 m (576 ft) (pylon)
- Longest span: 405 m (1,329 ft)

History
- Designer: Seshadri Srinivasan, Dar Al-Handasah
- Construction start: 1993
- Construction end: 1997

Location
- Interactive map of Wadi Laban Bridge

The Wadi Laban Bridge is a cable-stayed bridge in Riyadh, Saudi Arabia, designed by Seshadri Srinivasan (Dar Al-Handasah). It was built between 1993 and 1997.

== See also ==
- List of bridges in Saudi Arabia
