= King Fahd Causeway =

Road connection between Khobar, Saudi Arabia and Bahrain

King Fahd Causeway جسر الملك فهد
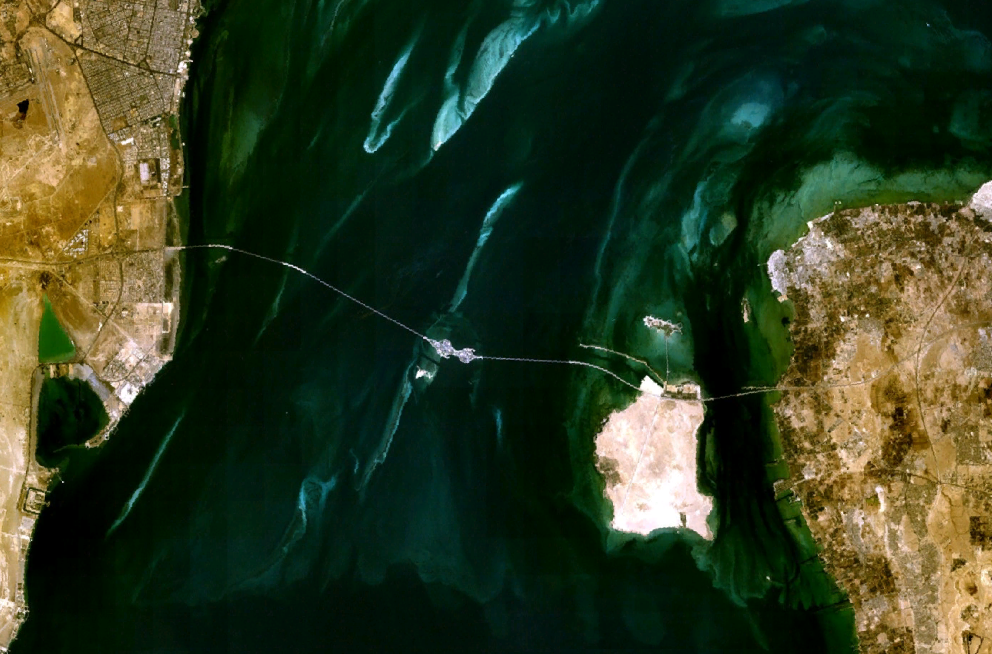
- Satellite image of the King Fahd Causeway
- Coordinates: 26°10′57″N 50°20′09″E
- Carries: Motor vehicles
- Crosses: Gulf of Bahrain
- Locale: Bahrain; Saudi Arabia
- Official name: King Fahd Causeway
- Other name(s): Bahrain Bridge (by residents of Saudi Arabia), Saudi Bridge (by residents of Bahrain)
- Named for: Fahd bin Abdulaziz Al Saud
- Maintained by: King Fahd Causeway Authority
- Website: www.kfca.sa

Characteristics
- Total length: 25 km (16 mi)
- Width: 23 m (75 ft)
- Longest span: 150 m

History
- Constructed by: Ballast Nedam
- Construction cost: US$800 million
- Opened: 26 November 1986; 39 years ago

Statistics
- Toll: SAR 35, BHD 3.5 (small vehicles); SAR 35, BHD 3.5 (light trucks and small buses); SAR 50, BHD 5 (large buses); SAR 5, BHD 0.500 per ton (trucks)

Location
- Interactive map of King Fahd Causeway

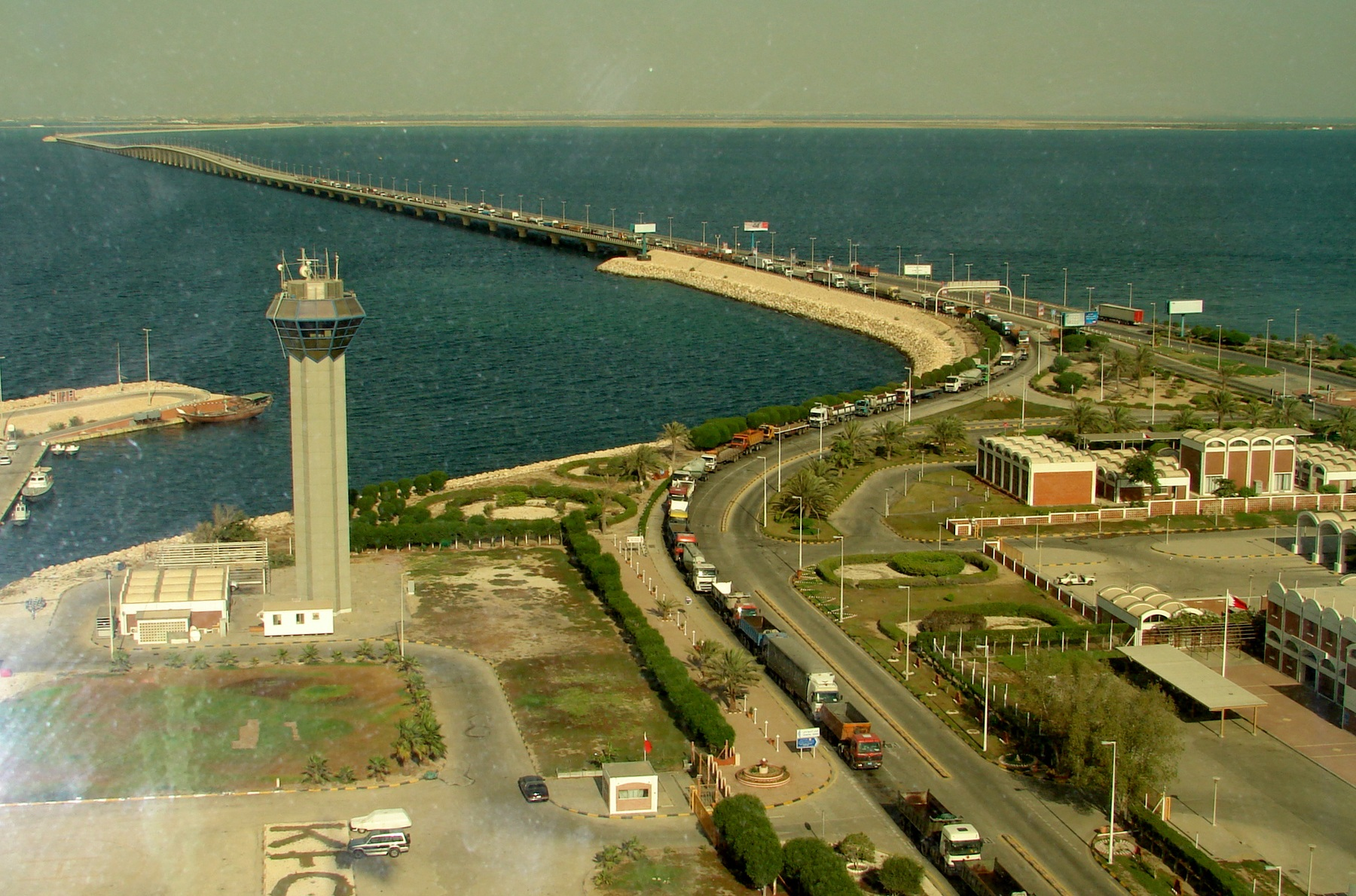
View of the causeway, facing east (Bahraini side)

The King Fahd Causeway (Arabic: جسر الملك فهد, romanized: Jisr al-Malik Fahd) is a 25 km (15.5 mi) long series of bridges and causeways connecting Khobar, Saudi Arabia, and Al Jasra, Bahrain across the Gulf of Bahrain.

Its five bridges rest on 536 concrete pylons, with seven embankments in the gulf's shallower water. One of the embankments, known as Middle Island (الجزيرة الوسطى, al-Jazirat al-Wustaa), has been converted into a sizeable artificial island with customs and immigration facilities, a mosque and gardens, and fast-food restaurants now known as Passport Island. Another island towards the eastern end of the causeway belongs to Bahrain and is known as Umm an Nasan (ام النعسان, Um al-Na'saan).

== History ==
The King Fahd Causeway spans long stretches of sea and reclaimed land.

The idea of building a bridge linking Bahrain to the eastern region of Saudi Arabia had been of great interest to the two kingdoms for generations. The project to build the bridge began during an official visit to Bahrain in 1954 by King Saud; his wish was to nurture and further solidify the bonds between the two countries.

Following Bahrain's declaration of independence, Prince Fahd bin Abdulaziz, then the interior minister of Saudi Arabia, led a high-level delegation to Bahrain. At the close of the visit, Fahd said that Saudi Arabia was seriously interested in constructing a land bridge that would connect the two countries.

In 1965, plans to construct the causeway began to take form officially when Sheikh Khalifah ibn Sulman Al Khalifah, the prime minister of Bahrain, paid a courtesy visit to King Faisal at which time the king again expressed his wish to move forward.

Subsequently, Bahrain, which drove on the left, changed to driving on the right in 1967. This was to bring it into line with neighbouring countries.

In 1968, a joint committee was formed to assess the finances required for undertaking the task. As a result, the committee requested the World Bank contribute assistance to implement the mammoth-sized project including environmental and geographical aspects of the region.

The idea of constructing the causeway was originally based on improving the cultural and social bonds between Saudi Arabia and Bahrain.

In the summer of 1973, King Faisal, in a meeting which included Emir Sheikh Isa bin Salman Al Khalifa as well as Prince Fahd bin Abdulaziz and Sheikh Khalifa bin Salman Al Khalifa, suggested the committee ignore economic and financial issues with the project, and instead concentrate on the actual construction.

In 1975, the World Bank submitted its study and advice after seeking assistance from specialist international expertise in studying the geographic, environmental factors and maritime currents.

In spring 1976, during a visit by King Khalid bin Abdulaziz to Sheikh Isa bin Salman Al Khalifa, the two monarchs agreed to set up a ministerial committee to work on implementation of the project.

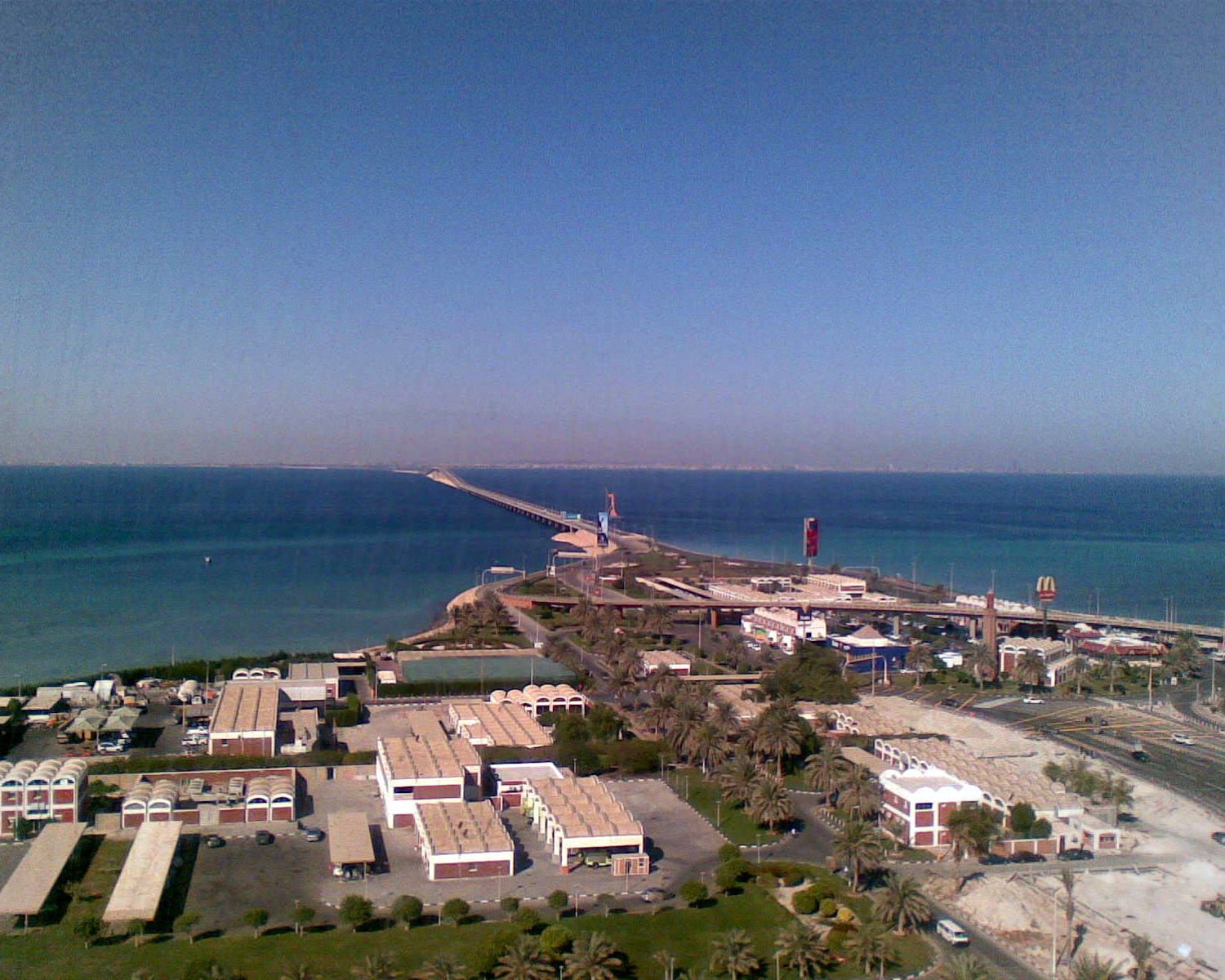
The causeway from the Saudi Arabian side

On 8 July 1981, Mohammed Aba Al-Khail, Minister for Finance and National Economy of Saudi Arabia, and Yousuf Ahmed Al-Shirawi, Minister of Industrial Development in Bahrain, signed an agreement to start construction on the maritime causeway.

On 11 November 1982, King Fahd bin Abdulaziz and Sheikh Isa bin Salman Al Khalifa unveiled the curtain on the Memorial Plaque during a formal ceremony attended by leaders of the GCC states marking the beginning of the project.

On 11 April 1985, Sheikh Khalifa bin Salman Al Khalifa, the prime minister of Bahrain, pressed the button to install the final part of the box bridges, thereby finally linking the Saudi mainland with Bahrain.

On 26 November 1986, the causeway was officially inaugurated in the presence of King Fahd and Sheikh Isa bin Salman Al Khalifa, with the latter consenting to naming the bridge the King Fahd Causeway.

As of 2010, an estimated 25,104 vehicles use the causeway daily. The 2010 total number of travelers across the causeway from both countries was 19.1 million passengers, or an average of 52,450 passengers per day.

The Saudi–led intervention in Bahrain, which used the causeway to cross over into Bahrain with 150 vehicles, began on 14 March 2011 to assist the Bahraini government in suppressing an anti-government uprising in the country. The intervention came three weeks after the U.S. pressured Bahrain to withdraw its military forces from the streets. As a decision by the Gulf Cooperation Council (GCC), the intervention included sending 1,000 (1,200) troops with vehicles from Saudi Arabia at the invitation of the Al-Khalifa ruling family.

== Construction details ==
The project cost a total of US$800 million (SAR3 billion). Al-Muhandis Nizar Kurdi Consulting Engineers was the sole Saudi partner of the consulting group (Saudi Danish Consultants) which completed the study, design and construction supervision of the causeway. One of the major contractors of the project was Ballast Nedam, based in the Netherlands. It is unclear how many workers were engaged in the construction of the causeway. The four-lane road is 25 km (16 mi) long and its two roadways are 11.6 m (38 ft) wide. It was built using 350,000 m^{3} (12,000,000 cu ft) of concrete along with 147,000 metric tonnes of reinforced steel. The causeway was constructed in three segments starting from Saudi Arabia:

1. From Al-Aziziyyah, south of Khobar, to the Border Station on Passport Island
2. From the Border Station to Nasan Island in Bahrain
3. From Nasan Island to Al-Jasra, Northern Governorate, on the main island of Bahrain

Strict quality control regimes were established to ensure durability of the structure. In this regard, Al Hoty Stanger Ltd, the premier testing laboratory with SASO accreditation, was contracted to perform materials testing on both sides of the causeway project.

The production equipment for the bridge segments were supplied by the Dutch machine building company H.J. Grimbergen B.V.

== Border station ==
The border station is located on embankment No. 4, which, with a total area of 660,000 square metres (7,100,000 sq ft), is the largest of the embankments. This artificial island is known as Passport Island or Middle Island. The buildings of the King Fahd Causeway Authority and other government directorates were erected on the border station, as well as two mosques, two Coast Guard towers and two 65-metre-high (213 ft) tower restaurants. The border station also has extensive landscaping all around the islands in addition to the services and road stations.

The border station was designed as two connected islands, with the west side designated as Saudi Arabian and the east as Bahraini. The Saudi side of the border station has outlets of McDonald's and Kudu while the Bahraini side of the border station has a McDonald's outlet.

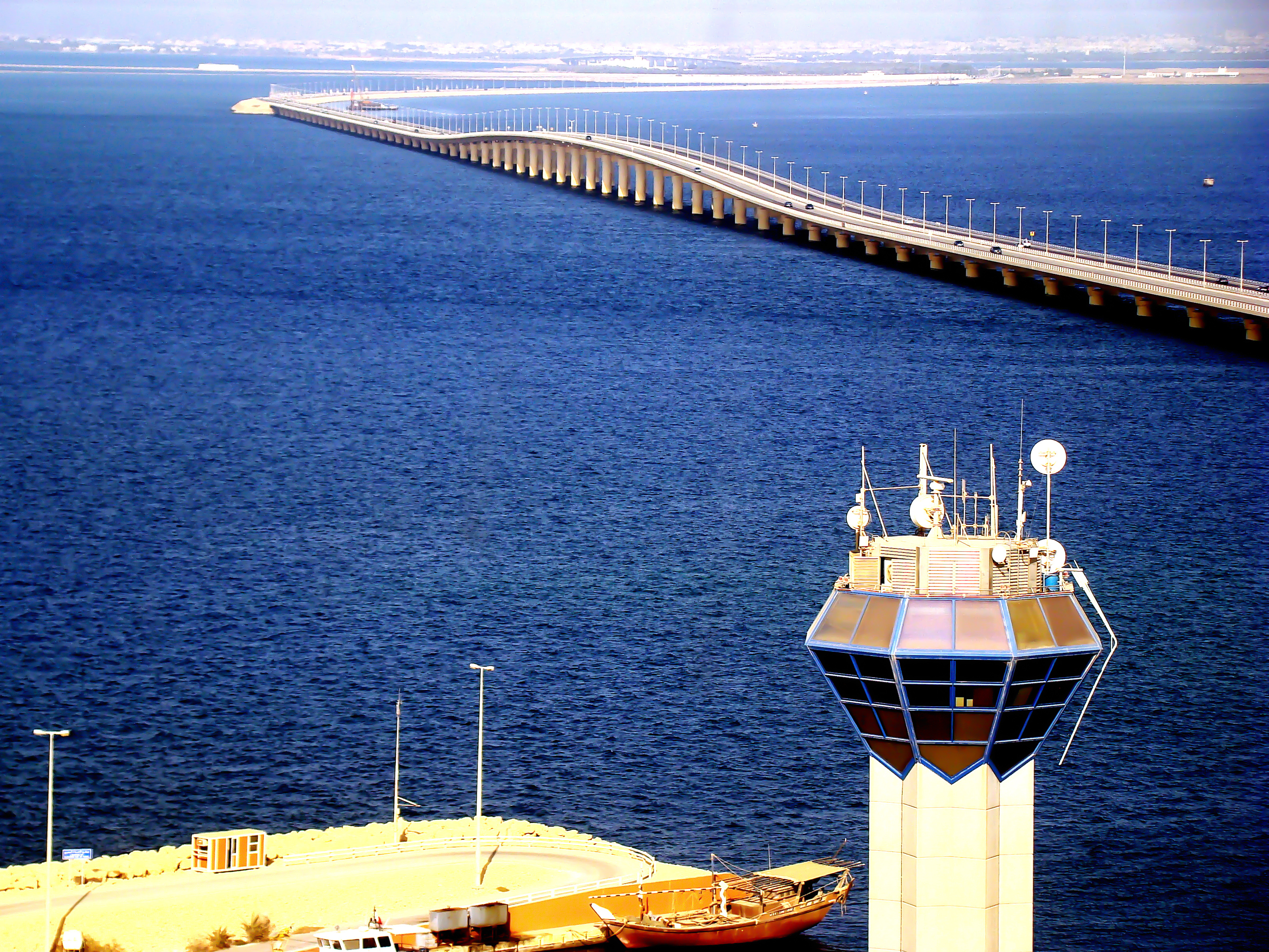
The bridge leading to mainland Bahrain

One-stop crossing was introduced on the King Fahd Causeway from 6 March 2017. Under the new system, commuters will only have to stop at one post for passport control, car clearance and customs. The measure will ease travel for commuters and is also expected to ease traffic congestion on the highway, as the previous system required stops at both Saudi and Bahraini check posts.

== Expansion ==
On 6 July 2010, Saudi newspapers quoted King Fahd Causeway Authority chief Bader Abdullah Al-Otaishan as saying that the King Fahd Causeway was to undergo a major expansion projected to cost $5.3 million. It was announced that the number of departure lanes would be increased from 10 to 17 and the number of arrival lanes from 13 to 18 on both sides. The renovation includes construction of a commercial centre on the Bahraini side.

"It will have a number of restaurants, coffee shops, a grocery shop, telephone stalls and a shop to meet travelers' needs," said Al-Otaishan. "We saw that there was a need for such a center to assist travelers". With points including climate-controlled washrooms and meeting places, the average traveller can be better facilitated. He said work was under way and that the centre would be completed by the first quarter of the next year. A Bahraini health centre was also being built to serve travelers and causeway staff. "It will feature an emergency room and ambulance to serve whoever is using the causeway – travelers or employees," he said, noting a Saudi health centre was also planned for 2011. A security checkpoint near the Bahraini entrance of the causeway was to be added to the checkpoint near the Saudi entrance. "It will allow us to control the causeway and close it," Al-Otaishan said.

The project also included expanded public utilities such as washrooms and mosques on both sides of the causeway, to be completed by the end of 2011. A separate project, to revamp the two tower restaurants, one Saudi and one Bahraini, was announced. The renovation would not alter the towers' historic appearance. Al-Otaishan told local newspapers that tenders for the project on the Saudi side had already been approved, with the Bahraini side set to follow suit.

== See also ==
- King Hamad Causeway
- List of things named after Saudi kings
- Qatar–Bahrain Causeway
- List of longest bridges in the world
- List of bridges in Bahrain
- List of bridges in Saudi Arabia
- List of international bridges
