= Transport in Bahrain =

Transportation networks and infrastructure in Bahrain

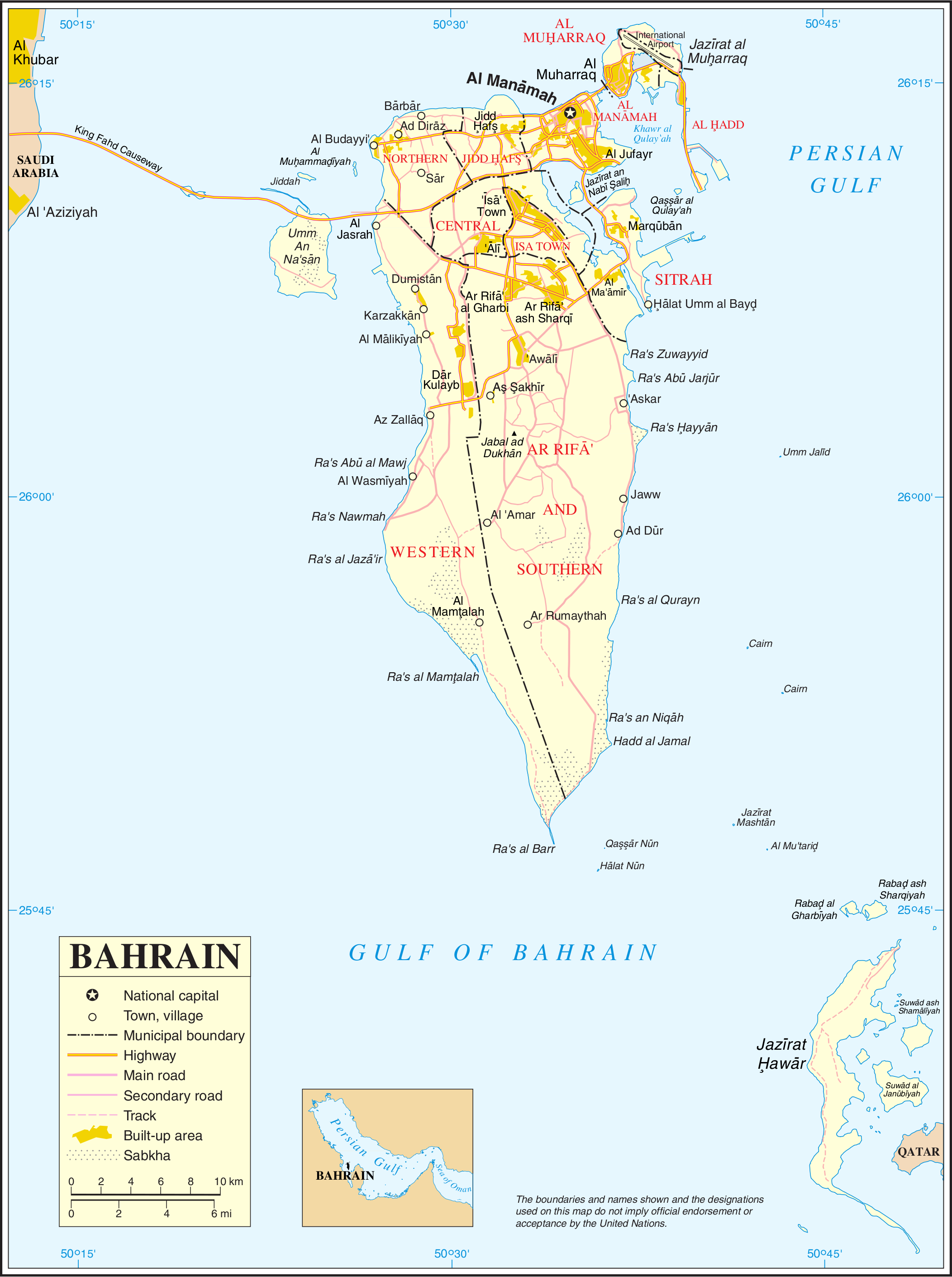
Transport layout of Bahrain

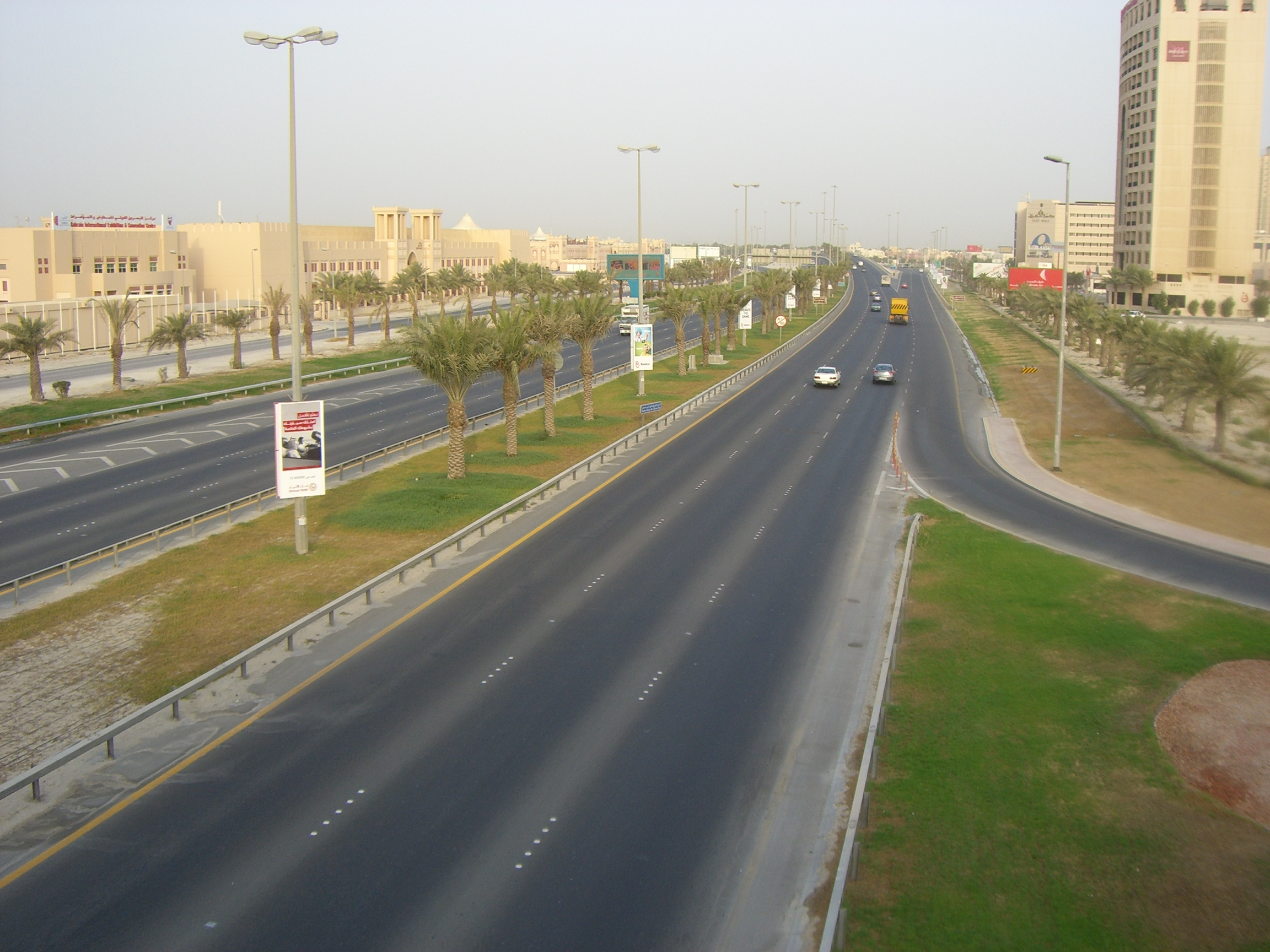
A trunk highway in Manama

Transport in Bahrain encompasses road transportation by car, air transportation and shipping.

The country traditionally had one of the cheapest prices for gasoline, at the equivalent of US$0.21 per litre ($0.78 per gallon) in 2011. Due to massive budgetary deficits and low oil prices, the Bahraini government increased the price of gasoline in 2016–2017 to $0.37 per litre.

== Road transport ==
The widening of roads in the old districts of Manama and the development of a national network linking the capital to other settlements commenced as early as the arrival of the first car in 1914. Due to the continuous increase in the number of cars, a series of ring roads were constructed in Bahrain, notably Isa Al Kabeer Avenue in the 1930s, Exhibition Avenue in the 1960s and Al Fateh Highway in the 1980s. To the north, the foreshore used to be around Government Avenue in the 1920s but it shifted to a new road, King Faisal Road, in the early 1930s which became the coastal road. To the east, a bridge connected Manama to Muharraq since 1929, a new causeway was built in 1941 which replaced the old wooden bridge. Vehicle movement between the two islands peaked after the construction of the Bahrain International Airport in 1932.

To the south of Manama, roads connected groves, lagoons and marshes of Hoora, Adliya, Gudaibiya and Juffair. Villages such as Mahooz, Ghuraifa, Seqaya served as the end of these roads. To the west, a major growth in the number of vehicle ma from 3,379 in 1954 and to 18,372 cars in 1970 caused urban development to primarily focus on expanding the road network, widening carriageways and the establishment of more parking spaces. Many tracks previously laid in the pre-oil era (prior to the 1930s) were resurfaced and widened, turning them into 'road arteries'. Initial widening of the roads started in the Manama Souq district, widening its main roads by demolishing encroaching houses.A highway was built that linked Manama to the isolated village port of Budaiya, this highway crossed through the 'green belt' villages of Sanabis, Jidhafs and Duraz. To the south, a road was built that connected Manama to Riffa. The discovery of oil accelerated the growth of the city's road network.

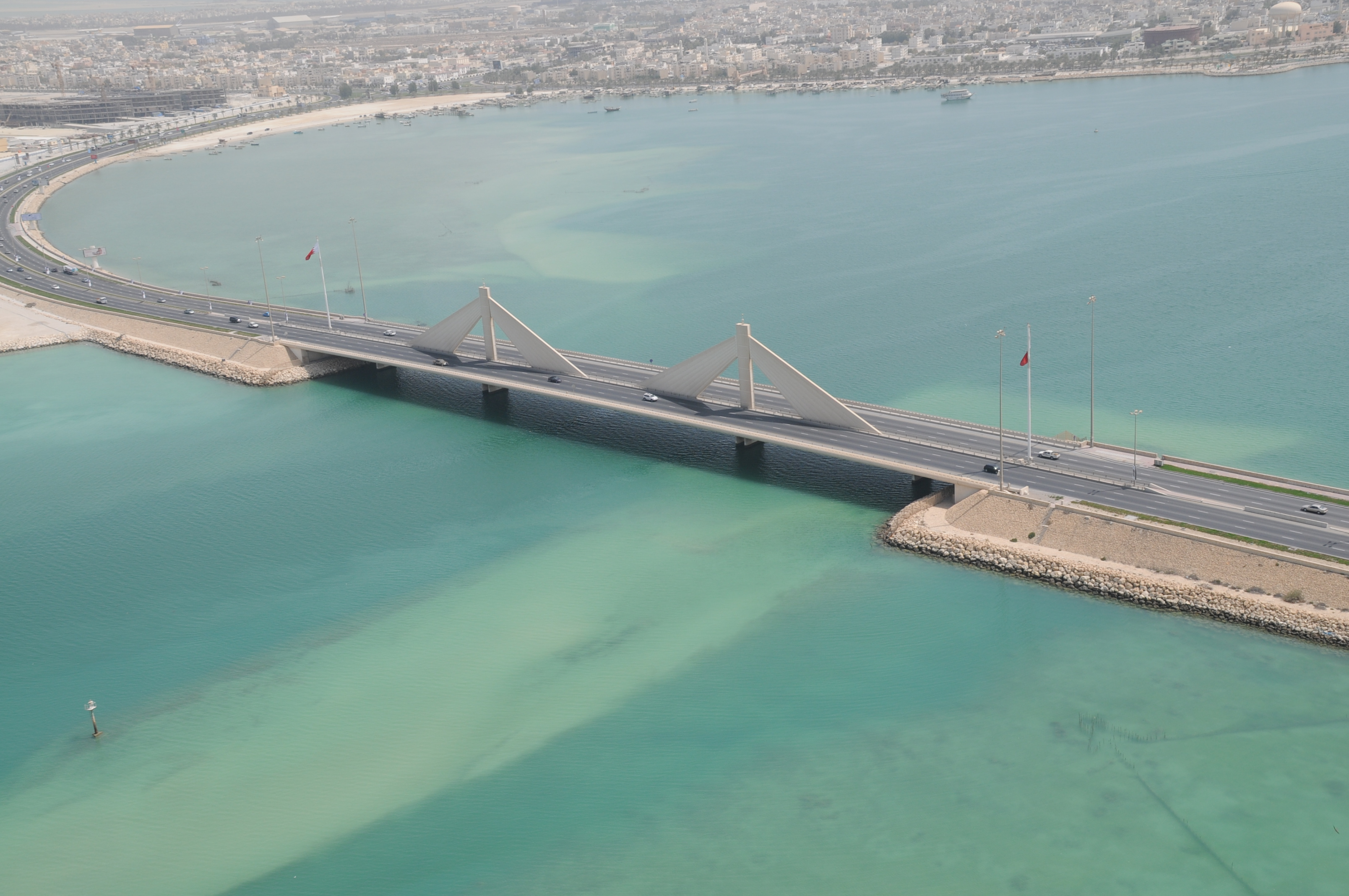
The bridge connecting Manama to Muharraq.

The four main islands and all the towns and villages are linked by well-constructed roads. There were 4,122 km (2,561 mi) of roadways as of 2010, of which 3,392 km (2,108 mi) were paved. Multiple causeways stretching over 2.8 km (2 mi), connect Manama with Muharraq Island, and the Sitra Causeway joins Sitra to the main island. A four-lane highway atop a 24 km (15 mi) causeway, linking Bahrain with the Saudi Arabian mainland via the island of Umm an-Nasan was completed in December, 1986, and financed by Saudi Arabia.

Private vehicles and taxis are the primary means of transportation in the city.

Bahrain changed from driving on the left to driving on the right in November 1967.

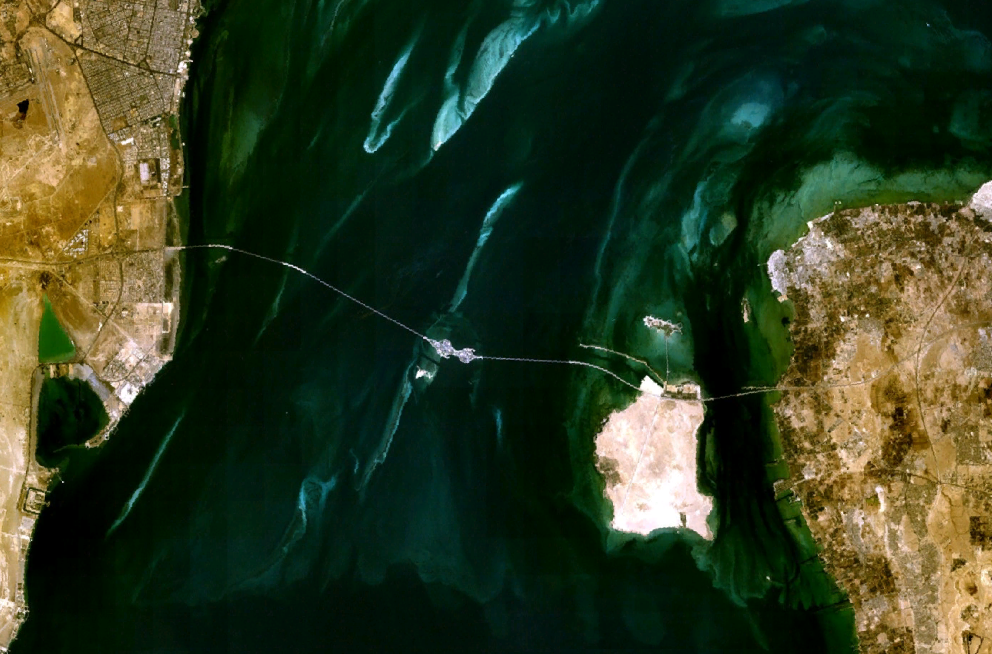
The King Fahd Causeway as seen from space

=== International highways ===
- King Fahd Causeway, measuring 25 km (16 mi) connects Bahrain and Saudi Arabia through a multiple-dike bridge.
- Qatar–Bahrain Friendship Bridge, will be 45 km (28 mi) long, connecting Bahrain and Qatar as the longest fixed link in the world, consisting both roads and railway.

== Railways ==
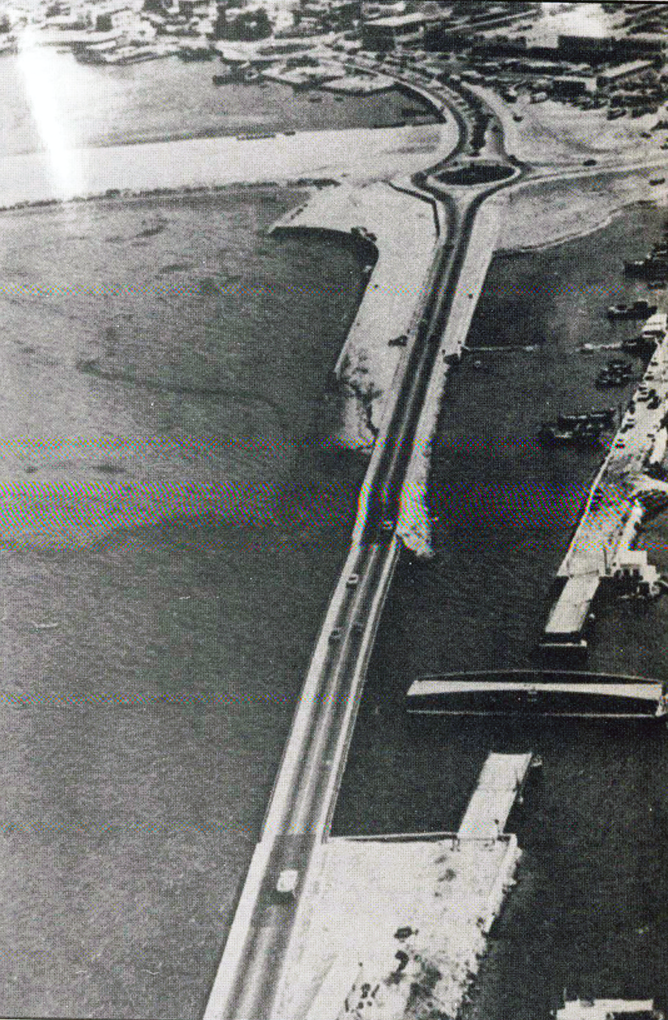
The first bridges connecting Manama to Muharraq, the Hamad Bin Isa Causeway.

As of 2025, there were no railways in Bahrain, but plans were developing for a railway system connecting all the countries in the Persian Gulf and for a light rail network within Bahrain. A subway system has also been proposed. In August 2018, Al-Ayam reported that transportation officials in Bahrain were looking for "bids to fund a new metro railway system in the fourth quarter of 2019." There were plans for the rail to be international, connecting to local railway systems in the UAE and Saudi Arabia. According to Ehsan Bayat, Bahrain's system will contribute 36 km (22 mi) to the network. The project is to be completed in four phases over four years and cost $1–2 billion, as a joint venture between the public and private sector. It will be a 109 km (68 mi) railway system, and the first in Bahrain. It will be called the GCC Railway, linking all six Gulf States. Along with private funders, it will be funded by the Ministry of Transportation in KSA and King Fahad Causeway Authority.

== Airports ==
Bahrain has four airports, all of which have paved runways. One airport is civil (Bahrain International Airport) and three are military (Isa Air Base, Sakhir Air Base, and Riffa Air Base).

== Ports and harbors ==
Sa'ada marina in Muharraq.

Bahrain has five recognised harbors in Manama, Mina Salman, Sitrah, Muharraq, and the Khalifa bin Salman port in Hidd. The port of Mina Salman can accommodate 16 oceangoing vessels drawing up to 11 m (36 ft).

On 6 November 2025, Bahrain and Qatar launched a passenger ferry service connecting Sa'ada Marina on Muharraq island in Bahrain to the northern Qatari port of Al Ruwais. Operated by the Masar group, a subsidiary of Bahrain's sovereign wealth fund Mumtalakat, the 70-minute route is expected to initially run twice a day before increasing services to three times a day.

== Pipelines ==
Element	Pipeline distance	Year estimated
Crude oil	54 km (34 mi)	2013
Natural gas	20 km (12 mi)	2013

== Merchant marine ==
Since 2014, Bahrain has sought to promote itself as an open register. As of 2020, there were 234 ships in Bahrain's merchant marine, of which 11 were general cargo ships, four were oil tankers, and 219 were other types of ships.
