= Transport in Réunion =

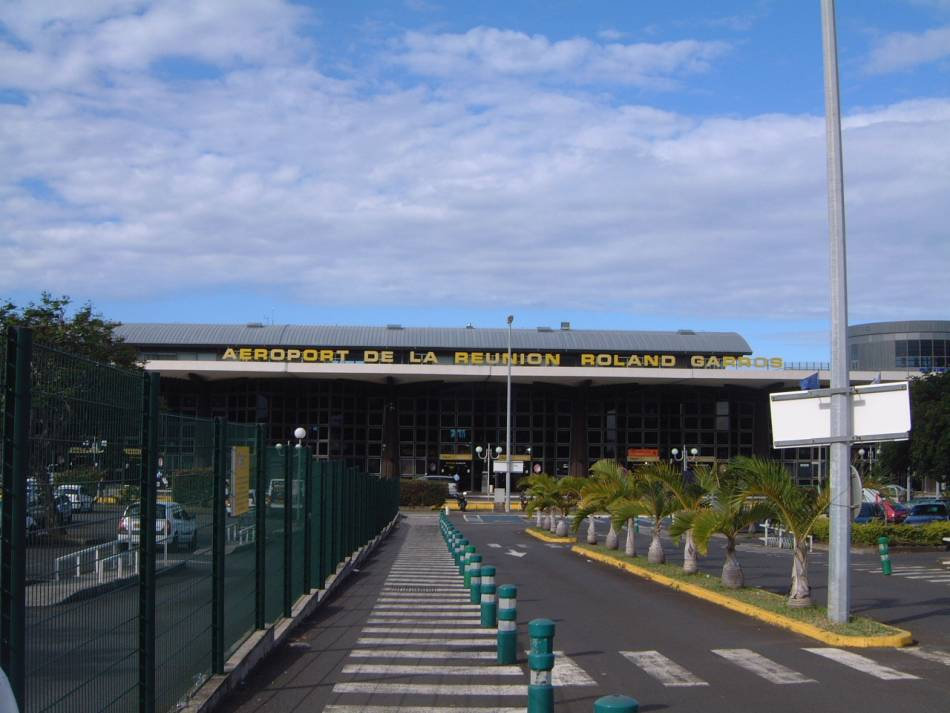
Roland Garros Airport

Réunion possesses a network of highways, which cover a total distance of 2,784 km. Of that length, 2,187 km of the road system is paved. There are no roads going into the cirque of Mafate; thus transportation there has to take place by foot or helicopter.

== Motorways ==
A system of highways that run between the main cities has been developed.

- Route national 1 (N1/RN1) connects Saint-Denis to Saint-Pierre, also connecting Le Port, Saint-Paul, La Saline Les Hauts and Saint-Louis. It has a length of 76 km.
- N2 connects Saint-Denis to Saint-Benoît, also connecting Saint-André. Its length is 34 km.
- N3 connects Saint-Pierre to Saint-Benoît, but the motorway only goes from Saint-Pierre to Le Tampon, with a length of 7 km.

== Sea ==
There are two major ports in Réunion: Le Port and Pointe des Galets. There are six marinas. Réunion possesses a merchant marine of one ship with a weight exceeding 1,000 gt, which is a chemical tanker.

== Airports ==
There are two airports on the island, of which both have paved runways. The main airport is the international Roland Garros Airport located close to Saint-Denis and the second one is the Aéroport de Pierrefond, located near Saint-Pierre in the south of the island.

== Railways ==
There are no railways in Réunion, with the exception of a short tourist line, which was originally part of a larger rail network. A 42 km light rail project was cancelled in 2010, after a regional government change in 2010, mostly because the project was considered too expensive (€1.6 billion). The region's new president chose to fund a new coastal road instead. In 2019 a new light rail system was proposed to link Le Barachois with the airport.

== Cable car ==
Due to huge traffic congestion, channelled by the rough topography on the main coastal road, public authorities invested in a cable car transportation system, linking two districts of Saint-Denis : Le Chaudron to Bois de Nèfles, with three intermediate stops. Built by POMA, a leading French company in cable car systems, it opened in March 2022. With 46 cabins, it is designed to transport up to 1200 persons per hour. This cable car is the first in the whole Indian Ocean.
