= Jasra =

Village on the western coast of Bahrain

Coordinates: 26°10′N 50°27′E

Al Jasra (Arabic: الجسرة, sometimes transliterated as Jasra) is a coastal village situated on the western coast of the Kingdom of Bahrain. It is situated in the Northern Governorate administrative region of the country and in the vicinity of the King Fahd Causeway. The village is notable for being the site of a historic house called Bait Al-Jasra (English: Al Jasra house) as well as its handcrafting history.

== Handicrafts ==
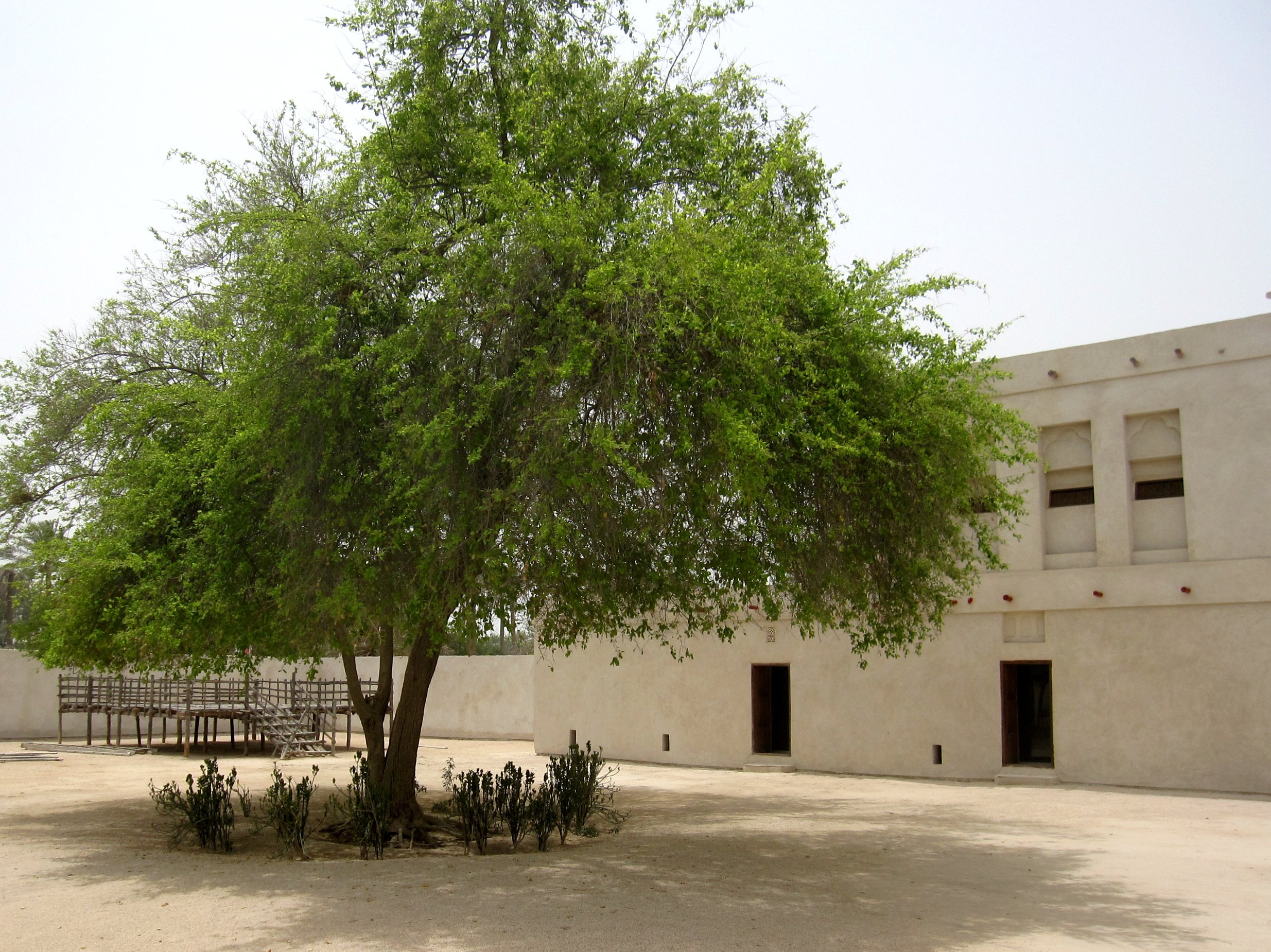
The Al-Jasra house.

The village was noted for having a strong handcrafting history, as with most villages in Bahrain, with some having their own souqs. A local handicraft centre was launched in 1990 to preserve the arts and crafts of Al Jasra village. Crafts traditionally produced by the village included woodworks, basket weaving, sadow making, pottery making, cloth weaving and textile weaving.

== Al Jasra House ==
Bait Al-Jasra is a traditional-style house built with coral stones and palm tree trunks in 1907 by Shaikh Hamad bin Abdullah Al-Khalifa and later adopted as a summer home for Shaikh Salman bin Hamad Al Khalifa. It is the birthplace of Isa bin Salman Al Khalifa, the Emir of Bahrain until 1999, in 1933. The house itself was dilapidated and was restored in 1986.
