= Gulf of Bahrain =

Inlet in the Persian Gulf

Coordinates: 25°41′50″N 50°32′03″E

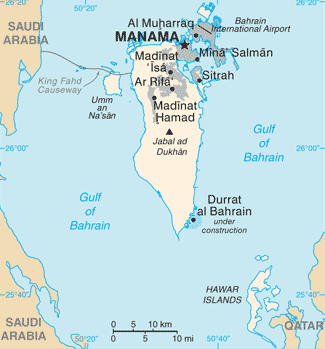
Gulf of Bahrain

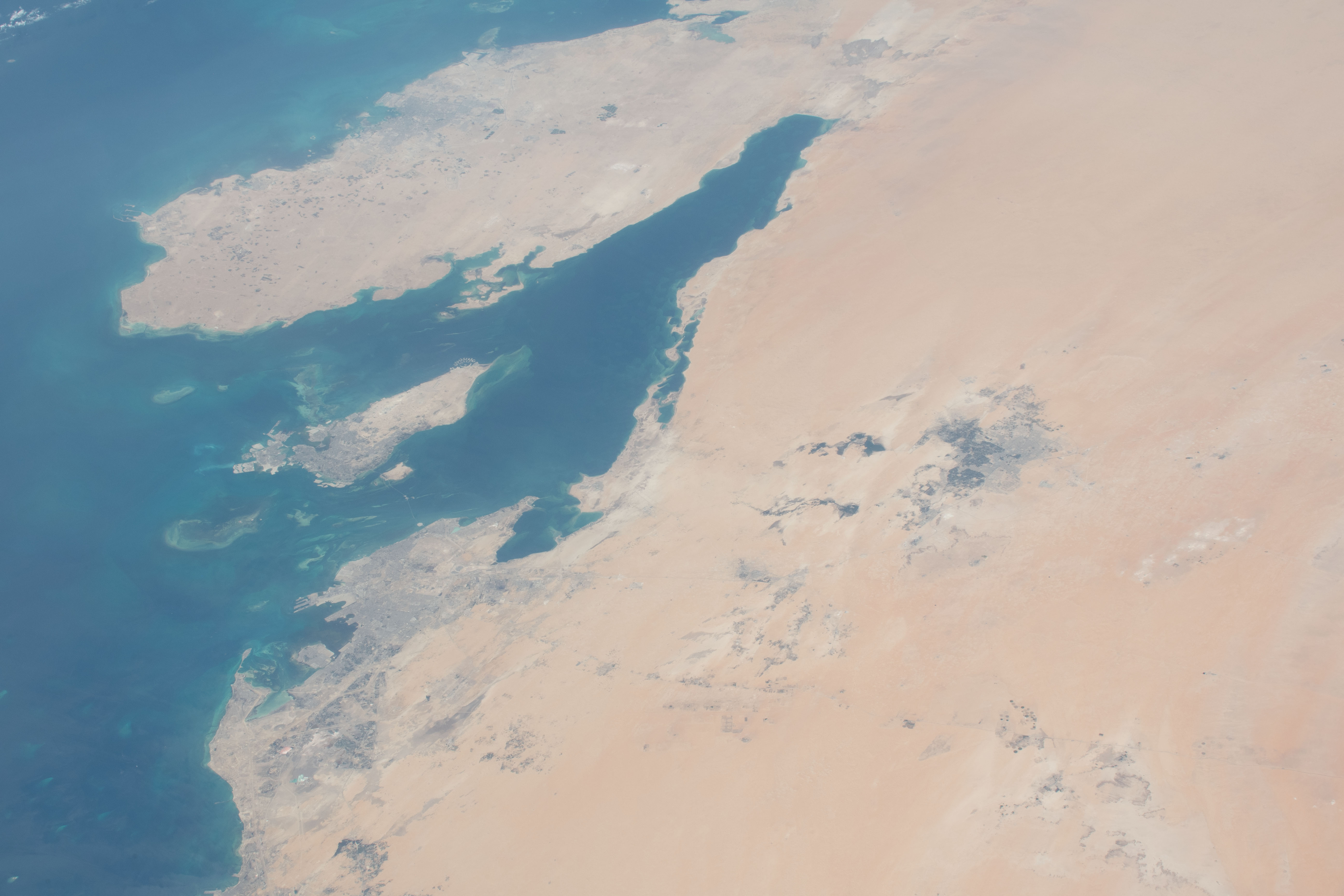
View from the International Space Station of the Gulf of Bahrain, facing southeast, with Qatar visible at top, and Bahrain off it.

The Gulf of Bahrain (Arabic: خليج البحرين, romanized: Khalīj al-Baḥrayn) is an inlet of the Persian Gulf on the east coast of Saudi Arabia, separated from the main body of water by the peninsula of Qatar. It surrounds the islands of Bahrain. The King Fahd Causeway crosses the western section of the Gulf of Bahrain, connecting Saudi Arabia to Bahrain.

== Geography ==
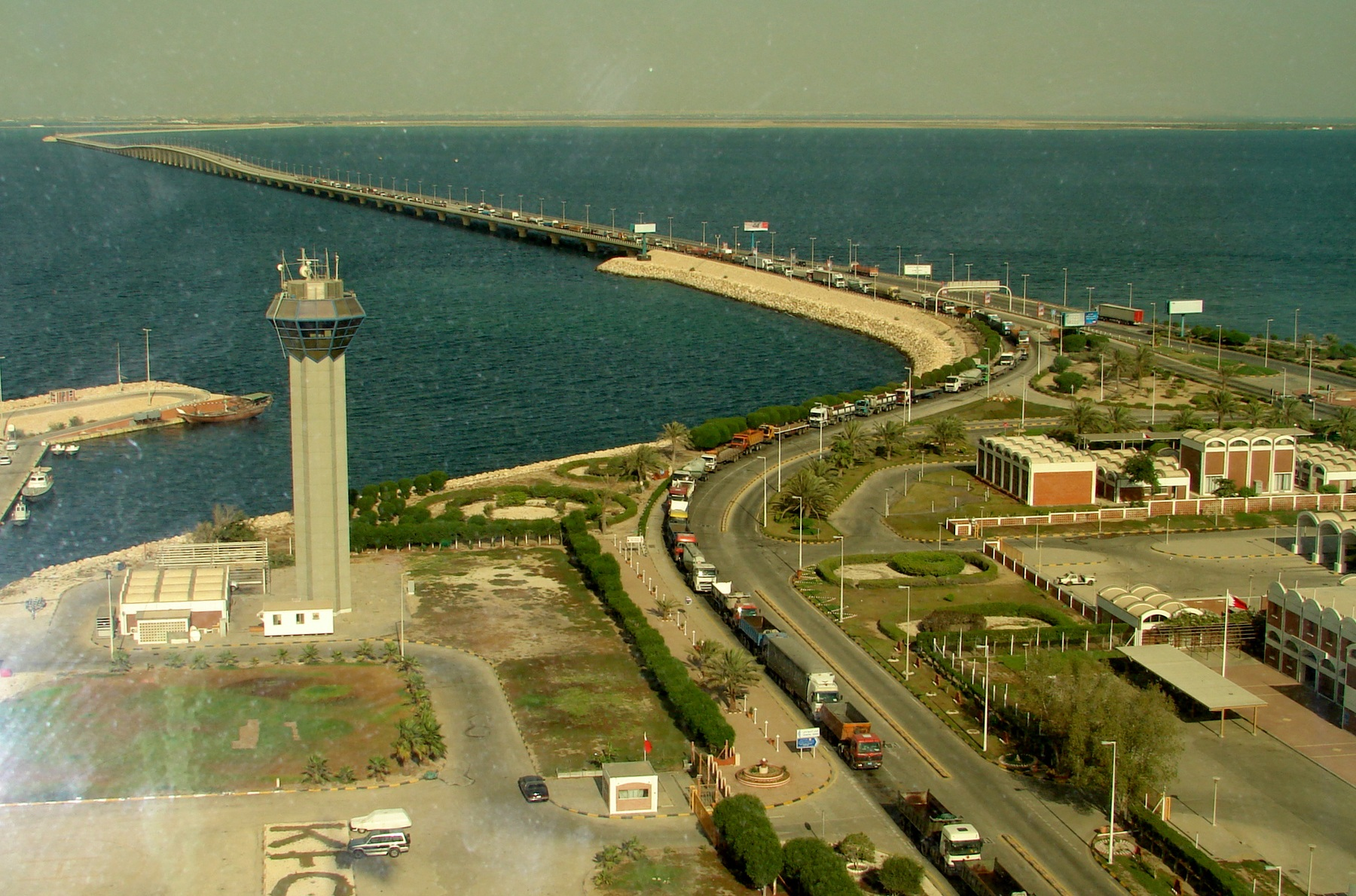
The King Fahd Causeway over the Gulf of Bahrain viewed from the east

The Gulf of Bahrain is a large bay lying on the west side of the Persian Gulf, between the peninsula of Qatar and Saudi Arabia. Midway between the northerly tip of Qatar and the coast of Saudi Arabia lies Bahrain, a group of six islands and many small islets. The Gulf of Bahrain thus has two openings to the Persian Gulf, the westernmost of which is spanned by a causeway leading to Saudi Arabia. The elongated southern portion of the Gulf of Bahrain forms the Gulf of Salwah. To the southeast of Bahrain Island, and close to the coast of Qatar, lie the Hawar Islands, now part of Bahrain.

The King Fahd Causeway that connects Saudi Arabia to the island of Bahrain was inaugurated on 26 November 1986. It consists of five bridges linked by otherwise solid embankments and the design was chosen to try to minimize the environmental impact. Another causeway, the Qatar–Bahrain Causeway, is planned to link Bahrain to Qatar. This one will be solid for about half its length and the other half will be bridge. The presence of the causeway is likely to have a considerable effect on the circulation of water in the Gulf.

== Flora and fauna ==
The Hawar Islands, just off the coast of Qatar, were listed as a Ramsar site in 1997. they are home to many bird species including Socotra cormorants. On the main island there are small herds of Arabian oryx and sand gazelle.

The Gulf of Bahrain is shallow and the waters have a small thermal capacity. They are subject to wide fluctuations in temperature, with a range of 14 to 35 °C (57 to 95 °F) around the coasts. The water is also rather more saline (10%) than other parts of the Persian Gulf. Around Bahrain there are seagrass meadows, coral reefs, mudflats and mangrove thickets. These areas are important for the biodiversity of the area, providing habitats for invertebrates, juvenile fish, turtles and dugongs.

Bahrain has been expanding its land area by dredging the seabed and depositing material around its coast. In 1963, the area of Bahrain was 668 square kilometres (258 sq mi) and by 2007 it was 759 square kilometres (293 sq mi). Extensive coral reefs in the adjoining seas have been destroyed and the increased sediment in the sea has had a deleterious effect on others. The Fasht Adham reef between Bahrain and Qatar was damaged by heat stress in 1996 and 1998 but has since been almost completely destroyed.
