= List of countries and territories by number of land borders =

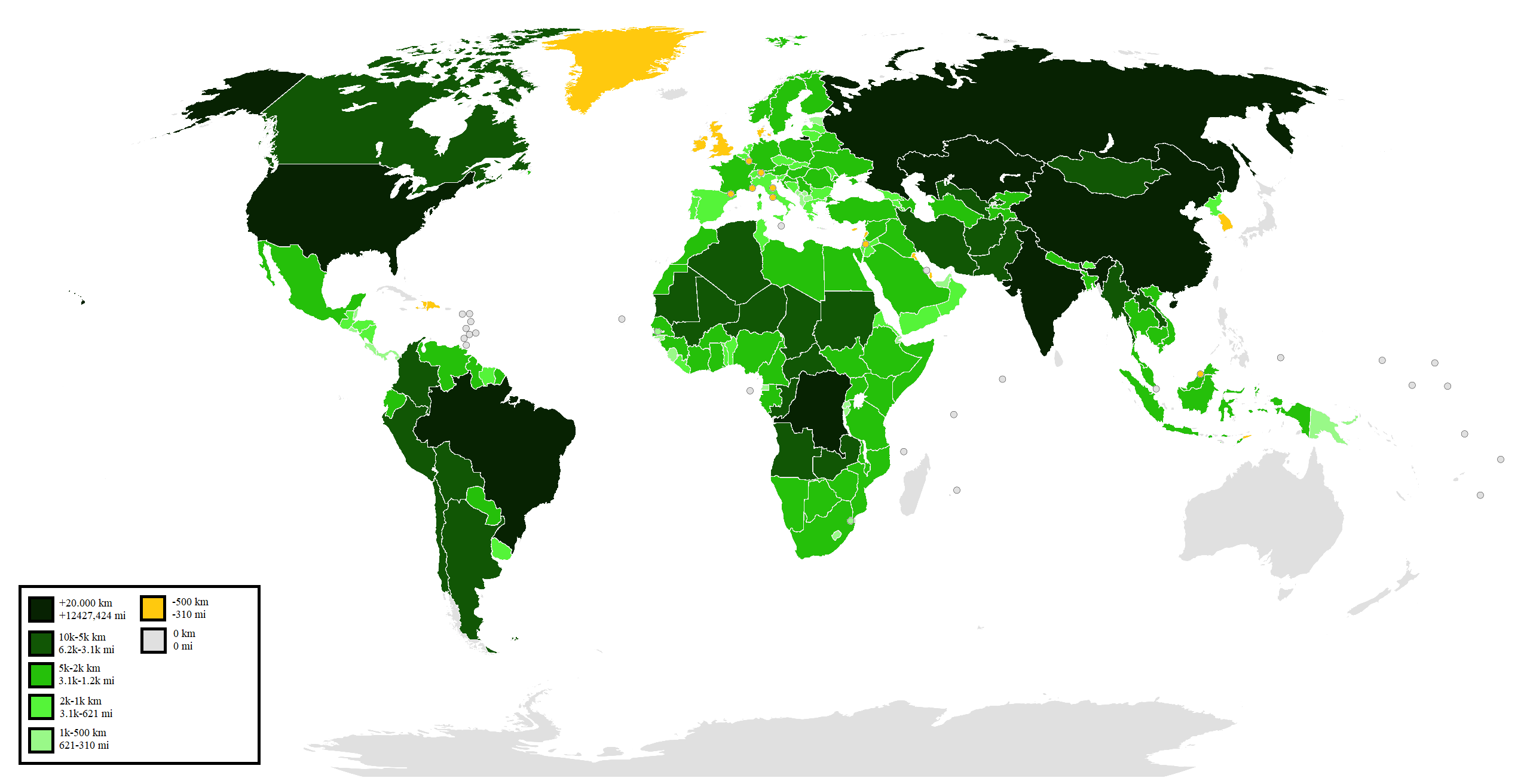
Countries by land border length

Antarctica and countries in purple are those without any land border.

This list gives the number of distinct land borders of each country or territory, but not the neighbouring countries and territories. The length of each border is included, as is the total length of each country's or territory's borders.

Countries or territories that are connected only by man-made structures such as bridges, causeways or tunnels are not considered to have land borders. However, borders along lakes, rivers, and other internal waters are considered land borders for the purposes of this article.

== Land borders ==
Distinct land borders: Refers to the number of separate geographic boundaries a country shares with its neighbours. A single country may have multiple distinct land borders with the same neighbour (e.g., due to enclaves, exclaves, or disconnected regions).

Distinct land neighbours: Refers to the number of unique countries a nation borders via land.

Country or territory (Territories without full sovereignty in italics) (Note: The concept of state sovereignty is somewhat imprecise and there are disagreements about whether certain territories are sovereign. There are currently 195 states that are generally regarded as "fully" sovereign: this includes the 193 member states of the United Nations plus Vatican City and Palestine. Some of these states have under their jurisdiction territories, dependencies, or collectivities that are clearly non-sovereign geographical areas. These territories are generally regarded as being subsumed within the overarching sovereignty of the governing state. For example, the United Kingdom holds sovereignty over the territory of Gibraltar, even though Gibraltar is not considered to be part of the United Kingdom. There are a few territories in the world that are neither clearly sovereign nor clearly subsumed under another state's sovereignty. Often, these territories have declared themselves to be sovereign, but they are either not widely recognized as such or lack some of the necessary conditions for sovereign statehood. In these cases, explanatory footnotes indicate how the territory is treated for the purposes of this list.)	Total length of land borders (Note: Land border lengths will vary depending on the scale by which they are measured, and therefore these figures without a source accompanied by an explanation of how they were measured and at what scale makes comparisons impossible; for more information see coastline paradox.)		No. of distinct land borders	No. of distinct land neighbours	Land border neighbours and border length (Territories without full sovereignty in italics) (#) = No. of distinct land boundaries with that country or territory
Country or territory (Territories without full sovereignty in italics)	km	mi	No. of distinct land borders	No. of distinct land neighbours	Land border neighbours and border length (Territories without full sovereignty in italics) (#) = No. of distinct land boundaries with that country or territory
Afghanistan	5,529	3,436	6	6	China: 76 km (47 mi); Iran: 935 km (581 mi); Pakistan: 2,670 km (1,660 mi); Tajikistan: 1,206 km (749 mi); Turkmenistan: 744 km (462 mi); Uzbekistan: 144 km (89 mi)
Albania	720	450	4	4	Greece: 282 km (175 mi); Kosovo: (Note: If Kosovo is considered part of Serbia, some numbers in the table would be reduced by one (e.g., when a state borders both Serbia and Kosovo). Other numbers would remain the same (e.g., when a state borders Kosovo but not Serbia).) 112 km (70 mi); North Macedonia: 151 km (94 mi); Montenegro: 172 km (107 mi)
Algeria	6,470	4,020	7	7	Libya: 982 km (610 mi); Mali: 1,376 km (855 mi); Mauritania: 463 km (288 mi); Morocco: 1,559 km (969 mi); Niger: 956 km (594 mi); Tunisia: 1,010 km (630 mi); Western Sahara: (Note: Western Sahara is a non-self-governing territory. Administration is split between Morocco and the partially unrecognised Sahrawi Arab Democratic Republic, both of which claim sovereignty over the entire territory (see Legal status of Western Sahara). For purposes of this list, Western Sahara is considered to be a sovereign country.) 42 km (26 mi)
Andorra	120	75	2	2	France: 56.6 km (35.2 mi); Spain: 63.7 km (39.6 mi)
Angola	5,198	3,230	5	4	Democratic Republic of the Congo (2): 2,511 km (1,560 mi) (Note: 225 km (140 mi) via Angola's discontiguous Cabinda Province.); Republic of the Congo: 201 km (125 mi); Namibia: 1,376 km (855 mi); Zambia: 1,110 km (690 mi)
Antigua and Barbuda	0	0	0	0	
Argentina	9,665	6,006	6	5	Bolivia: 832 km (517 mi); Brazil: 1,224 km (761 mi); Chile (2): 5,300 km (3,300 mi) (Note: 5,150 km (3,200 mi) via the long continental border and 150 km (93 mi) via the border on Tierra del Fuego.); Paraguay: 1,880 km (1,170 mi); Uruguay: 579 km (360 mi)
Armenia	1,254	779	9	4	Azerbaijan (6): 787 km (489 mi) (Note: 566 km (352 mi) with Azerbaijan-proper and 221 km (137 mi) with the Nakhchivan enclave. Additionally, in Armenia, there exist three Azerbaijani enclaves: Barxudarlı, Yuxarı Əskipara and Karki (located north of the region of Nakhchivan) Reciprocally, there exists one Armenian enclave, a village called Artsvashen in north-western Azerbaijan. This makes a total of 6 separate borders, including the 2 major borders.); Georgia: 164 km (102 mi); Iran: 35 km (22 mi); Turkey: 268 km (167 mi)
Australia	0	0	0	0	
Austria	2,562	1,592	9	8	Czech Republic: 362 km (225 mi); Germany: 817 km (508 mi); Hungary: 366 km (227 mi); Italy: 430 km (270 mi); Liechtenstein: 34 km (21 mi); Slovakia: 96 km (60 mi); Slovenia: 330 km (210 mi); Switzerland (2): 164 km (102 mi)
Azerbaijan	2,013	1,251	11	5	Armenia (6): 787 km (489 mi); Georgia: 322 km (200 mi); Iran (2): (Note: One via Azerbaijan-proper and one via the Nakhchivan exclave.) 432 km (268 mi); Russia: 284 km (176 mi); Turkey: (Note: Via the Nakhchivan exclave.) 9 km (5.6 mi)
Azores	0	0	0	0	
Bahamas	0	0	0	0	
Bahrain	0.196	0.122	1	1	Saudi Arabia: 0.196 km (0.122 mi) (Note: via King Fahd Causeway at Passport Island)
Bangladesh	4,246	2,638	3	2	India (2), including Dahagram-Angarpota: (Note: On the India-Bangladesh border in the Indian district of Cooch-Behar, before 1 August 2015, there were 92 Bangladeshi exclaves, with a total area of 47.7 km^{2} (18.4 sq mi). Similarly, there were 106 Indian exclaves inside Bangladesh, with a total area of 69.5 km^{2} (26.8 sq mi). Twenty-one of the Bangladeshi exclaves were within Indian exclaves, and three of the Indian exclaves were within Bangladeshi exclaves. The largest Indian exclave, Balapara Khagrabari, surrounded a Bangladeshi exclave, Upanchowki Bhajni, which itself surrounded an Indian exclave called Dahala Khagrabari, of less than one hectare. These 198 exclave borders plus the main border gave a total of 199 sections of border. Today the only remaining exclave is the Bangadeshi exclave of Dahagram-Angarpota. ("The end of the enclaves". The Economist. September 7, 2011.)) 4,053 km (2,518 mi); Myanmar: 193 km (120 mi)
Barbados	0	0	0	0	
Belarus	2,900	1,800	6	5	Latvia: 141 km (88 mi); Lithuania: 502 km (312 mi); Poland: 407 km (253 mi); Russia (2): (Note: Sankovo-Medvezhye is a Russian village enclaved by Belarus.) 959 km (596 mi); Ukraine: 891 km (554 mi)
Belgium	1,385	861	39	4	France: 620 km (390 mi); Germany (6): (Note: Germany has a group of 5 enclaves created by the Vennbahn railway trackbed between the towns of Roetgen and Monschau (south of Aachen) that was granted Belgian sovereignty. Belgium therefore has 5 borders with these exclaves and one border with the rest of Germany.) 167 km (104 mi); Luxembourg: 148 km (92 mi); Netherlands (31): (Note: The town of Baarle in the southern Netherlands is made up of the municipality of Baarle-Hertog, a group of 22 Belgian enclaves within the Netherlands; and of the Dutch municipality of Baarle-Nassau, which itself has one enclave in the main body of Belgium and 7 counter-enclaves inside two of the Belgian enclaves. There are therefore 30 separate enclave border sections, plus the main border for a total of 31 distinct sections.) 450 km (280 mi)
Belize	516	321	2	2	Guatemala: 266 km (165 mi); Mexico: 250 km (160 mi)
Benin	1,989	1,236	4	4	Burkina Faso: 306 km (190 mi); Niger: 266 km (165 mi); Nigeria: 773 km (480 mi); Togo: 644 km (400 mi)
Bhutan	1,075	668	2	2	China: 470 km (290 mi); India: 605 km (376 mi)
Bolivia	6,743	4,190	5	5	Argentina: 832 km (517 mi); Brazil: 3,400 km (2,100 mi); Chile: 861 km (535 mi); Paraguay: 750 km (470 mi); Peru: 900 km (560 mi)
Bosnia and Herzegovina	1,459	907	5	3	Croatia (2): 932 km (579 mi); Montenegro: 225 km (140 mi); Serbia (2): (Note: The village of Međurečje (part of Rudo municipality, Foča Region) is completely surrounded by the Serbian village of Sastavci, near Priboj, Zlatibor District.) 302 km (188 mi)
Botswana	4,015	2,495	4	4	Namibia: 1,360 km (850 mi); South Africa: 1,840 km (1,140 mi); Zambia: 0.15 km (0.093 mi); Zimbabwe: 813 km (505 mi)
Brazil	14,691	9,129	10	10	Argentina: 1,224 km (761 mi); Bolivia: 3,400 km (2,100 mi); Colombia: 1,643 km (1,021 mi); French Guiana (Note: This territory is not sovereign but is an overseas department and an overseas region of France. As such, it is sovereign French territory that is an integral part of the French Republic.) (France): 673 km (418 mi); Guyana: 1,119 km (695 mi); Paraguay: 1,290 km (800 mi); Peru: 2,995 km (1,861 mi); Suriname: 597 km (371 mi); Uruguay: 985 km (612 mi); Venezuela: 2,200 km (1,400 mi)
Brunei	381	237	2	1	Malaysia (2): 381 km (237 mi)
Bulgaria	1,808	1,123	5	5	Greece: 494 km (307 mi); North Macedonia: 148 km (92 mi); Romania: 608 km (378 mi); Serbia: 318 km (198 mi); Turkey: 240 km (150 mi)
Burkina Faso	3,193	1,984	6	6	Benin: 306 km (190 mi); Ivory Coast: 584 km (363 mi); Ghana: 549 km (341 mi); Mali: 1,000 km (620 mi); Niger: 628 km (390 mi); Togo: 126 km (78 mi)
Burundi	974	605	3	3	Democratic Republic of the Congo: 233 km (145 mi); Rwanda: 290 km (180 mi); Tanzania: 451 km (280 mi)
Cambodia	2,572	1,598	3	3	Laos: 541 km (336 mi); Thailand: 803 km (499 mi); Vietnam: 1,228 km (763 mi)
Cameroon	4,591	2,853	6	6	Central African Republic: 797 km (495 mi); Chad: 1,094 km (680 mi); Republic of the Congo: 523 km (325 mi); Equatorial Guinea: 189 km (117 mi); Gabon: 298 km (185 mi); Nigeria: 1,690 km (1,050 mi)
Canada	8,894	5,526	6	2	United States (4): 8,893 km (5,526 mi) (Note: 6,416 km (3,987 mi) via the contiguous 48 states and 2,477 km (1,539 mi) via Alaska.); Greenland (Denmark): 1.2 km (0.75 mi) (Note: On Hans Island, as of the 2022 agreement.)
Cape Verde	0	0	0	0	
Central African Republic	5,213	3,239	6	6	Cameroon: 797 km (495 mi); Chad: 1,197 km (744 mi); Democratic Republic of the Congo: 1,577 km (980 mi); Republic of the Congo: 467 km (290 mi); South Sudan: 682 km (424 mi); Sudan: 483 km (300 mi)
Chad	5,968	3,708	6	6	Cameroon: 1,094 km (680 mi); Central African Republic: 1,197 km (744 mi); Libya: 1,055 km (656 mi); Niger: 1,175 km (730 mi); Nigeria: 87 km (54 mi); Sudan: 1,360 km (850 mi)
Chile	6,171	3,834	4	3	Argentina (2): 5,300 km (3,300 mi); Bolivia: 861 km (535 mi); Peru: 160 km (99 mi)
China (Note: For information on the Republic of China, see the listing in this table under "Taiwan".)	22,147	13,762	17	14	Afghanistan: 76 km (47 mi); Bhutan: 470 km (290 mi); India (3): 3,488 km (2,167 mi); Kazakhstan: 1,533 km (953 mi); North Korea: 1,416 km (880 mi); Kyrgyzstan: 858 km (533 mi); Laos: 423 km (263 mi); Mongolia: 4,677 km (2,906 mi); Myanmar: 2,185 km (1,358 mi); Nepal: 1,236 km (768 mi); Pakistan: 596 km (370 mi); Russia (2): 3,645 km (2,265 mi); Tajikistan: 414 km (257 mi); Vietnam: 1,281 km (796 mi)
Colombia	6,004	3,731	5	5	Brazil: 1,643 km (1,021 mi); Ecuador: 590 km (370 mi); Panama: 225 km (140 mi); Peru: 1,496 km (930 mi); Venezuela: 2,050 km (1,270 mi)
Comoros	0	0	0	0	
Democratic Republic of the Congo	10,730	6,670	10	9	Angola (2): 2,511 km (1,560 mi); Burundi: 233 km (145 mi); Central African Republic: 1,577 km (980 mi); Republic of the Congo: 2,410 km (1,500 mi); Rwanda: 217 km (135 mi); South Sudan: 628 km (390 mi); Tanzania: 459 km (285 mi); Uganda: 765 km (475 mi); Zambia: 1,930 km (1,200 mi)
Republic of the Congo	5,504	3,420	5	5	Angola: 201 km (125 mi); Cameroon: 523 km (325 mi); Central African Republic: 467 km (290 mi); Democratic Republic of the Congo: 2,410 km (1,500 mi); Gabon: 1,903 km (1,182 mi)
Costa Rica	639	397	2	2	Nicaragua: 309 km (192 mi); Panama: 330 km (210 mi)
Croatia	2,197	1,365	6	5	Bosnia and Herzegovina (2): 932 km (579 mi); Hungary: 329 km (204 mi); Montenegro: 25 km (16 mi); Serbia: 241 km (150 mi); Slovenia: 670 km (420 mi)
Cuba	0	0 (Note: Cuba has a 29 km (18 mi) border with the United States Naval Base at Guantanamo Bay. However, the naval base is sovereign Cuban territory and subject to a 1903 treaty is leased perpetually by the U.S. government; therefore, this does not constitute an international border.)	0	0	United States: 29 km (18 mi)
Cyprus	152	94	6 (Note: Akrotiri shares one border with Cyprus. Dhekelia shares one main boundary with Cyprus, but there are three separate enclaves of Cyprus within the main Dhekelia–Cyprus border, which creates three additional borders.)	1	Akrotiri and Dhekelia (Note: This territory is not sovereign but is a British Overseas Territory. Its territory constitutes part of the sovereign territory of the United Kingdom but strictly speaking is not part of the United Kingdom itself.) (United Kingdom) (6): 152 km (94 mi)
Czech Republic	1,881	1,169	4	4	Austria: 362 km (225 mi); Germany: 815 km (506 mi); Poland: 658 km (409 mi); Slovakia: 215 km (134 mi)
Denmark (constituent country)	68	42	1	1	Germany: 68 km (42 mi)
(Danish Realm) Denmark, Kingdom of →includes: →Denmark (constituent country) →Faroe Islands →Greenland	69	43	2	2	Germany: 68 km (42 mi); Canada: 1.2 km (0.75 mi)
Djibouti	528	328	3	3	Eritrea: 125 km (78 mi); Ethiopia: 342 km (213 mi); Somaliland: 61 km (38 mi)
Dominica	0	0	0	0	
Dominican Republic	360	220	1	1	Haiti: 360 km (220 mi)
Ecuador	2,010	1,250	2	2	Colombia: 590 km (370 mi); Peru: 1,420 km (880 mi)
Egypt	2,665	1,656	4	4	Gaza Strip (State of Palestine): (Note: In 1988, the Palestine Liberation Organization declared as sovereign the State of Palestine. Palestinian sovereignty is recognized by 135 countries, and it has observer status at the United Nations. The State of Palestine consists of the West Bank and the Gaza Strip. In this list, for purposes of counting bordering states, Palestine is considered to be a single sovereign entity.) 11 km (6.8 mi); Israel: 266 km (165 mi); Libya: 1,115 km (693 mi); Sudan: 1,273 km (791 mi)
El Salvador	545	339	2	2	Guatemala: 203 km (126 mi); Honduras: 342 km (213 mi)
Equatorial Guinea	539	335	2	2	Cameroon: 189 km (117 mi); Gabon: 350 km (220 mi)
Eritrea	1,626	1,010	3	3	Djibouti: 125 km (78 mi); Ethiopia: 912 km (567 mi); Sudan: 605 km (376 mi)
Estonia	633	393	2	2	Latvia: 339 km (211 mi); Russia: 294 km (183 mi)
Eswatini	535	332	2	2	Mozambique: 105 km (65 mi); South Africa: 430 km (270 mi)
Ethiopia	5,328	3,311	6	6	Djibouti: 342 km (213 mi); Eritrea: 912 km (567 mi); Kenya: 861 km (535 mi); Somalia: 1,600 km (990 mi); South Sudan: 883 km (549 mi); Sudan: 723 km (449 mi)
Fiji	0	0	0	0	
Finland	2,690	1,670	4	3	Norway: 736 km (457 mi); Sweden (2): 614 km (382 mi); Russia: 1,340 km (830 mi)
France, Metropolitan	2,889	1,795	10	8	Andorra: 56.6 km (35.2 mi); Belgium: 620 km (390 mi); Germany: 451 km (280 mi); Italy: 488 km (303 mi); Luxembourg: 73 km (45 mi); Monaco: 4.4 km (2.7 mi); Spain (3): (Note: The town of Llívia is a Spanish exclave situated inside French territory. France has one border with it and two sections of border with the rest of Spain (separated by Andorra).) 623 km (387 mi); Switzerland: 573 km (356 mi)
France (including French overseas departments, collectivities, and territories) →includes: →Clipperton Island →French Guiana →French Polynesia →French Southern and Antarctic Lands (Note: Excluding Adélie Land.) →Guadeloupe →Martinique →Mayotte →Metropolitan France →New Caledonia →Réunion →Saint Barthélemy →Saint Martin →Saint Pierre and Miquelon →Wallis and Futuna	4,082	2,536	13	11	Andorra: 56.6 km (35.2 mi); Belgium: 620 km (390 mi); Brazil: (Note: Via French Guiana.) 673 km (418 mi); Germany: 451 km (280 mi); Italy: 488 km (303 mi); Luxembourg: 73 km (45 mi); Monaco: 4.4 km (2.7 mi); Sint Maarten (Note: This territory is not sovereign, but is a constituent country within the Kingdom of the Netherlands. Aruba, Curaçao, Sint Maarten and the Netherlands are constituent parts of one sovereign state.) (Note: Via Saint Martin.) (Netherlands): 10.2 km (6.3 mi); Spain (3): 623 km (387 mi); Suriname: 510 km (320 mi); Switzerland: 573 km (356 mi)
Gabon	2,551	1,585	3	3	Cameroon: 298 km (185 mi); Republic of the Congo: 1,903 km (1,182 mi); Equatorial Guinea: 350 km (220 mi)
The Gambia	740	460	1	1	Senegal: 740 km (460 mi)
Georgia	1,814	1,127	4	4	Armenia: 219 km (136 mi); Azerbaijan: 428 km (266 mi); Russia: 894 km (556 mi); Turkey: 273 km (170 mi)
Germany	3,621	2,250	15	9	Austria: 817 km (508 mi); Belgium (6): 167 km (104 mi); Czech Republic: 815 km (506 mi); Denmark: 68 km (42 mi); France: 451 km (280 mi); Luxembourg: 138 km (86 mi); Netherlands: 577 km (359 mi); Poland: 456 km (283 mi); Switzerland (2): (Note: Büsingen, Germany is an exclave in the canton of Schaffhausen, northern Switzerland. Switzerland has one border with it and one border with the rest of Germany.) 334 km (208 mi)
Ghana	2,094	1,301	3	3	Burkina Faso: 549 km (341 mi); Ivory Coast: 668 km (415 mi); Togo: 877 km (545 mi)
Greece	1,228	763	4	4	Albania: 282 km (175 mi); Bulgaria: 494 km (307 mi); Turkey: 206 km (128 mi); North Macedonia: 246 km (153 mi)
Grenada	0	0	0	0	
Guatemala	1,687	1,048	4	4	Belize: 266 km (165 mi); El Salvador: 203 km (126 mi); Honduras: 256 km (159 mi); Mexico: 962 km (598 mi)
Guinea	3,399	2,112	6	6	Ivory Coast: 610 km (380 mi); Guinea-Bissau: 386 km (240 mi); Liberia: 563 km (350 mi); Mali: 858 km (533 mi); Senegal: 330 km (210 mi); Sierra Leone: 652 km (405 mi)
Guinea-Bissau	724	450	2	2	Guinea: 386 km (240 mi); Senegal: 338 km (210 mi)
Guyana	2,462	1,530	3	3	Brazil: 1,119 km (695 mi); Suriname: 600 km (370 mi); Venezuela: 743 km (462 mi)
Haiti	360	220	1	1	Dominican Republic: 360 km (220 mi)
Honduras	1,520	940	3	3	Guatemala: 256 km (159 mi); El Salvador: 342 km (213 mi); Nicaragua: 922 km (573 mi)
Hong Kong (Note: Hong Kong is not sovereign but since 1997 has been a Special Administrative Region of the People's Republic of China. Hong Kong has a high degree of autonomy, including separate passports and a defined international boundary within China, but it is not considered a separate sovereign state for the purposes of this list.)	30	19	1	1	China: 30 km (19 mi)
Hungary	2,171	1,349	7	7	Austria: 366 km (227 mi); Croatia: 329 km (204 mi); Romania: 443 km (275 mi); Serbia: 151 km (94 mi); Slovakia: 677 km (421 mi); Slovenia: 102 km (63 mi); Ukraine: 103 km (64 mi)
Iceland	0	0	0	0	
India	14,209	8,829	9	6	Bangladesh (2): 4,053 km (2,518 mi); Bhutan: 605 km (376 mi); China (3): 3,488 km (2,167 mi); Myanmar: 1,463 km (909 mi); Nepal: 1,690 km (1,050 mi); Pakistan: 3,320 km (2,060 mi)
Indonesia	2,830	1,760	4	3	Timor-Leste (2): 228 km (142 mi); Malaysia: 1,782 km (1,107 mi); Papua New Guinea: 820 km (510 mi)
Iran	5,440	3,380	8	7	Afghanistan: 936 km (582 mi); Armenia: 35 km (22 mi); Azerbaijan (2): 611 km (380 mi); Iraq: 1,458 km (906 mi); Pakistan: 959 km (596 mi); Turkey: 499 km (310 mi); Turkmenistan: 992 km (616 mi)
Iraq	3,650	2,270	6	6	Iran: 1,458 km (906 mi); Jordan: 181 km (112 mi); Kuwait: 240 km (150 mi); Saudi Arabia: 814 km (506 mi); Syria: 605 km (376 mi); Turkey: 352 km (219 mi)
Ireland	499	310	1	1	United Kingdom: 499 km (310 mi)
Israel	1,017	632	6	5	Egypt: 266 km (165 mi); Gaza Strip (State of Palestine): 51 km (32 mi); Jordan: 238 km (148 mi); Lebanon: 79 km (49 mi); Syria: 76 km (47 mi); West Bank (state of Palestine): 307 km (191 mi)
Italy	1,932	1,200	7	6	Austria: 430 km (270 mi); France: 488 km (303 mi); San Marino: 39 km (24 mi); Slovenia: 232 km (144 mi); Switzerland (2): (Note: Campione d'Italia is enclaved in the canton of Ticino, Switzerland, although in practice it is administered as part of Switzerland. It is part of Swiss customs, uses the Swiss franc, its inhabitants have to pay income tax to Italy, though in a reduced measure, and it is under Italian sovereignty. Switzerland therefore has one border with it and one border with the rest of Italy.) 740 km (460 mi); Vatican City: 3.2 km (2.0 mi)
Jamaica	0	0	0	0	
Ivory Coast	3,110	1,930	5	5	Burkina Faso: 584 km (363 mi); Ghana: 668 km (415 mi); Guinea: 610 km (380 mi); Liberia: 716 km (445 mi); Mali: 532 km (331 mi)
Japan	0	0	0	0	
Jordan	1,635	1,016	5	5	Iraq: 181 km (112 mi); Israel: 238 km (148 mi); Saudi Arabia: 744 km (462 mi); Syria: 375 km (233 mi); West Bank (State of Palestine): 97 km (60 mi)
Kazakhstan	12,012	7,464	5	5	China: 1,533 km (953 mi); Kyrgyzstan: 1,051 km (653 mi); Russia: 6,846 km (4,254 mi); Turkmenistan: 379 km (235 mi); Uzbekistan: 2,203 km (1,369 mi)
Kenya	3,477	2,161	5	5	Ethiopia: 861 km (535 mi); Somalia: 682 km (424 mi); South Sudan: 232 km (144 mi); Tanzania: 769 km (478 mi); Uganda: 933 km (580 mi)
Kiribati	0	0	0	0	
Kosovo	701	436	4	4	Albania: 112 km (70 mi); Montenegro: 79 km (49 mi); North Macedonia: 159 km (99 mi); Serbia: 352 km (219 mi)
Kuwait	462	287	2	2	Iraq: 240 km (150 mi); Saudi Arabia: 222 km (138 mi)
Kyrgyzstan	3,878	2,410	11	4	China: 858 km (533 mi); Kazakhstan: 1,051 km (653 mi); Tajikistan (3): (Note: The Tajik village of Vorukh, along with another small piece of land near Kairagach are embodied in Kyrgyz land. There are therefore 3 sections of border between the two countries.) 870 km (540 mi); Uzbekistan (6): (Note: Barak, a small Kyrgyz village, is surrounded by Uzbekistan. Reciprocally, the Uzbek towns of So'x (39°58′N 71°08′E) and Shohimardon as well as the two tiny territories of Qal'acha and Khalmion (north of So'x) are all surrounded by Kyrgyz territory. There are therefore 5 enclave borders in addition to the main Kyrgyz/Uzbek border for a total of 6.) 1,099 km (683 mi)
Laos	5,083	3,158	5	5	Cambodia: 541 km (336 mi); China: 423 km (263 mi); Myanmar: 235 km (146 mi); Thailand: 1,754 km (1,090 mi); Vietnam: 2,130 km (1,320 mi)
Latvia	1,150	710	4	4	Belarus: 141 km (88 mi); Estonia: 339 km (211 mi); Lithuania: 453 km (281 mi); Russia: 217 km (135 mi)
Lebanon	454	282	2	2	Israel: 79 km (49 mi); Syria: 375 km (233 mi)
Lesotho	909	565	1	1	South Africa: 909 km (565 mi)
Liberia	1,585	985	3	3	Guinea: 563 km (350 mi); Ivory Coast: 716 km (445 mi); Sierra Leone: 306 km (190 mi)
Libya	4,348	2,702	6	6	Algeria: 982 km (610 mi); Chad: 1,055 km (656 mi); Egypt: 1,115 km (693 mi); Niger: 354 km (220 mi); Sudan: 383 km (238 mi); Tunisia: 459 km (285 mi)
Liechtenstein	76	47	2	2	Austria: 34 km (21 mi); Switzerland: 41 km (25 mi)
Lithuania	1,273	791	4	4	Belarus: 502 km (312 mi); Latvia: 453 km (281 mi); Poland: 91 km (57 mi); Russia: (Note: Via Kaliningrad Oblast.) 227 km (141 mi)
Luxembourg	359	223	3	3	Belgium: 148 km (92 mi); France: 73 km (45 mi); Germany: 138 km (86 mi)
Macau (Note: Macau is not sovereign but since 1999 has been a Special Administrative Region of the People's Republic of China. Macau has a high degree of autonomy, including separate passports and a defined international boundary within China, but it is not considered a separate sovereign state for the purposes of this list.) (China)	0.34	0.21	1	1	China: 0.34 km (0.21 mi)
Madagascar	0	0	0	0	
Madeira (Note: This territory is not sovereign but is an autonomous region of Portugal. Its territory constitutes a constituent part of the sovereign territory of Portugal.) (Portugal)	0	0	0	0	
Malawi	2,881	1,790	3	3	Mozambique: 1,569 km (975 mi); Tanzania: 475 km (295 mi); Zambia: 837 km (520 mi)
Malaysia	3,147	1,955	3	3	Brunei (2): 381 km (237 mi); Indonesia: 1,782 km (1,107 mi); Thailand: 506 km (314 mi)
Maldives	0	0	0	0	
Mali	7,243	4,501	7	7	Algeria: 1,376 km (855 mi); Burkina Faso: 1,000 km (620 mi); Ivory Coast: 532 km (331 mi); Guinea: 858 km (533 mi); Mauritania: 2,237 km (1,390 mi); Niger: 821 km (510 mi); Senegal: 419 km (260 mi)
Malta	0	0	0	0	
Marshall Islands	0	0	0	0	
Mauritania	5,074	3,153	4	4	Algeria: 463 km (288 mi); Mali: 2,237 km (1,390 mi); Senegal: 813 km (505 mi); Western Sahara: 1,561 km (970 mi)
Mauritius	0	0	0	0	
Mexico	4,353	2,705	3	3	Belize: 250 km (160 mi); Guatemala: 962 km (598 mi); United States: 3,141 km (1,952 mi)
Federated States of Micronesia	0	0	0	0	
Moldova	1,389	863	2	2	Romania: 450 km (280 mi); Ukraine: 939 km (583 mi)
Monaco	4.4	2.7	1	1	France: 4.4 km (2.7 mi)
Mongolia	8,220	5,110	2	2	China: 4,677 km (2,906 mi); Russia: 3,485 km (2,165 mi)
Montenegro	625	388	5	5	Albania: 172 km (107 mi); Bosnia and Herzegovina: 225 km (140 mi); Croatia: 25 km (16 mi); Kosovo: 79 km (49 mi); Serbia: 124 km (77 mi)
Morocco	2,018	1,254	5	3	Algeria: 1,559 km (969 mi); Western Sahara: 443 km (275 mi); Spain (3): 17 km (11 mi) (Note: 6.3 km (3.9 mi) via Ceuta; 9.6 km (6.0 mi) via Melilla; 85 m (279 ft) via Peñón de Vélez de la Gomera)
Mozambique	4,571	2,840	6	6	Eswatini: 105 km (65 mi); Malawi: 1,569 km (975 mi); South Africa (2): 491 km (305 mi); Tanzania: 756 km (470 mi); Zambia: 419 km (260 mi); Zimbabwe: 1,231 km (765 mi)
Myanmar	5,876	3,651	5	5	Bangladesh: 193 km (120 mi); China: 2,185 km (1,358 mi); India: 1,463 km (909 mi); Laos: 235 km (146 mi); Thailand: 2,416 km (1,501 mi)
Namibia	3,936	2,446	4	4	Angola: 1,376 km (855 mi); Botswana: 1,360 km (850 mi); South Africa: 967 km (601 mi); Zambia: 233 km (145 mi)
Nauru	0	0	0	0	
Nepal	2,926	1,818	2	2	China: 1,236 km (768 mi); India: 1,690 km (1,050 mi)
Netherlands (constituent country)	1,027	638	32	2	Belgium (31): 450 km (280 mi); Germany: 577 km (359 mi)
(Kingdom of the Netherlands) Netherlands, Kingdom of →includes: →Aruba →Curaçao →Netherlands, including Caribbean Netherlands →Sint Maarten	1,037	644	33	3	Belgium (31): 450 km (280 mi); Germany: 577 km (359 mi); Saint Martin (Note: This territory is not sovereign, but is an overseas collectivity of France, and as such it is part of the sovereign territory of France.) (France): 10.2 km (6.3 mi)
New Zealand	0	0	0	0	
Nicaragua	1,231	765	2	2	Costa Rica: 309 km (192 mi); Honduras: 922 km (573 mi)
Niger	5,697	3,540	7	7	Algeria: 956 km (594 mi); Benin: 266 km (165 mi); Burkina Faso: 628 km (390 mi); Chad: 1,175 km (730 mi); Libya: 354 km (220 mi); Mali: 821 km (510 mi); Nigeria: 1,497 km (930 mi)
Nigeria	4,047	2,515	4	4	Benin: 773 km (480 mi); Cameroon: 1,690 km (1,050 mi); Chad: 87 km (54 mi); Niger: 1,497 km (930 mi)
North Korea	1,673	1,040	3	3	China: 1,416 km (880 mi); South Korea: 238 km (148 mi); Russia: 19 km (12 mi)
North Macedonia	766	476	5	5	Albania: 151 km (94 mi); Bulgaria: 148 km (92 mi); Greece: 246 km (153 mi); Kosovo: 159 km (99 mi); Serbia: 62 km (39 mi)
Norway	2,551	1,585	3	3	Finland: 736 km (457 mi); Sweden: 1,619 km (1,006 mi); Russia: 196 km (122 mi)
Oman	1,374	854	6	3	Saudi Arabia: 676 km (420 mi); United Arab Emirates (4): 410 km (250 mi); Yemen: 288 km (179 mi)
Pakistan	7,545	4,688	4	4	Afghanistan: 2,670 km (1,660 mi); India: 3,320 km (2,060 mi); Iran: 959 km (596 mi); China: 596 km (370 mi)
Palau	0	0	0	0	
Palestine	466	290	4	3	Egypt: 11 km (6.8 mi); Israel (2): 358 km (222 mi); Jordan: 97 km (60 mi)
Panama	555	345	2	2	Colombia: 225 km (140 mi); Costa Rica: 330 km (210 mi)
Papua New Guinea	820	510	1	1	Indonesia: 820 km (510 mi)
Paraguay	3,920	2,440	3	3	Argentina: 1,880 km (1,170 mi); Bolivia: 750 km (470 mi); Brazil: 1,290 km (800 mi)
Peru	5,536	3,440	5	5	Bolivia: 900 km (560 mi); Brazil: 2,995 km (1,861 mi); Chile: 160 km (99 mi); Colombia: 1,496 km (930 mi); Ecuador: 1,420 km (880 mi)
Philippines	0	0	0	0	
Poland	2,788	1,732	7	7	Belarus: 407 km (253 mi); Czech Republic: 658 km (409 mi); Germany: 456 km (283 mi); Lithuania: 91 km (57 mi); Russia: 206 km (128 mi); Slovakia: 444 km (276 mi); Ukraine: 526 km (327 mi)
Portugal	1,214	754	1	1	Spain: 1,214 km (754 mi)
Qatar	60	37	1	1	Saudi Arabia: 60 km (37 mi)
Romania	2,508	1,558	6	5	Bulgaria: 608 km (378 mi); Hungary: 443 km (275 mi); Moldova: 450 km (280 mi); Serbia: 476 km (296 mi); Ukraine (2): 531 km (330 mi) (Note: Consisting of one border of 362 km (225 mi) and another of 169 km (105 mi).)
Russia	20,017	12,438	16	14	Azerbaijan: 284 km (176 mi); Belarus (2): 959 km (596 mi); China (2): 3,645 km (2,265 mi); Estonia: 294 km (183 mi); Finland: 1,340 km (830 mi); Georgia: 723 km (449 mi); Kazakhstan: 6,846 km (4,254 mi); North Korea: 19 km (12 mi); Latvia: 217 km (135 mi); Lithuania: 227 km (141 mi); Mongolia: 3,485 km (2,165 mi); Norway: 196 km (122 mi); Poland: 206 km (128 mi); Ukraine: 1,576 km (979 mi)
Rwanda	893	555	4	4	Burundi: 290 km (180 mi); Democratic Republic of the Congo: 217 km (135 mi); Tanzania: 217 km (135 mi); Uganda: 169 km (105 mi)
Saint Kitts and Nevis	0	0	0	0	
Saint Lucia	0	0	0	0	
Saint Pierre and Miquelon	0	0	0	0	
Saint Vincent and the Grenadines	0	0	0	0	
Samoa	0	0	0	0	
San Marino	39	24	1	1	Italy: 39 km (24 mi)
São Tomé and Príncipe	0	0	0	0	
Saudi Arabia	4,431	2,753	8	8	Bahrain: 0.196 km (0.122 mi); Iraq: 814 km (506 mi); Jordan: 744 km (462 mi); Kuwait: 222 km (138 mi); Oman: 676 km (420 mi); Qatar: 60 km (37 mi); United Arab Emirates: 457 km (284 mi); Yemen: 1,458 km (906 mi)
Senegal	2,640	1,640	5	5	The Gambia: 740 km (460 mi); Guinea: 330 km (210 mi); Guinea-Bissau: 338 km (210 mi); Mali: 419 km (260 mi); Mauritania: 813 km (505 mi)
Serbia	2,027	1,260	9	8	Bosnia and Herzegovina (2): 302 km (188 mi); Bulgaria: 318 km (198 mi); Croatia: 241 km (150 mi); Hungary: 151 km (94 mi); Kosovo: 352 km (219 mi); Montenegro: 124 km (77 mi); North Macedonia: 62 km (39 mi); Romania: 476 km (296 mi)
Seychelles	0	0	0	0	
Sierra Leone	958	595	2	2	Guinea: 652 km (405 mi); Liberia: 306 km (190 mi)
Singapore	0	0 (Note: Singapore is connected to Malaysia by a causeway and a bridge.)	0	0	
Slovakia	1,524	947	5	5	Austria: 96 km (60 mi); Czech Republic: 215 km (134 mi); Hungary: 677 km (421 mi); Poland: 444 km (276 mi); Ukraine: 91 km (57 mi)
Slovenia	1,334	829	4	4	Austria: 330 km (210 mi); Croatia: 670 km (420 mi); Italy: 232 km (144 mi); Hungary: 102 km (63 mi)
Solomon Islands	0	0	0	0	
Somalia	2,340	1,450	3	3	Djibouti: 61 km (38 mi); Ethiopia: 1,600 km (990 mi); Kenya: 682 km (424 mi)
South Africa	4,862	3,021	7	6	Botswana: 1,840 km (1,140 mi); Eswatini: 430 km (270 mi); Lesotho: 909 km (565 mi); Mozambique (2): 491 km (305 mi); Namibia: 967 km (601 mi); Zimbabwe: 225 km (140 mi)
South Korea	238	148	1	1	North Korea: 238 km (148 mi)
South Ossetia (Note: In May 1992, South Ossetia declared independence from Georgia. This declaration is only recognized by five UN member countries. (Note: Those countries are Nauru, Nicaragua, Russia, Syria and Venezuela.) In April 2008, the United Nations Security Council unanimously passed Resolution 1808 that reaffirmed "the commitment of all Member States to the sovereignty, independence and territorial integrity of Georgia within its internationally recognized borders".)	466	290	2	2	Russia: 74 km (46 mi); Georgia: 334 km (208 mi)
South Sudan	4,797	2,981	6	6	Central African Republic: 682 km (424 mi); Democratic Republic of the Congo: 628 km (390 mi); Ethiopia: 883 km (549 mi); Kenya: 232 km (144 mi); Sudan: 1,937 km (1,204 mi); Uganda: 435 km (270 mi)
Spain	1,918	1,192	9	5	Andorra: 63.7 km (39.6 mi); France (3): 623 km (387 mi); Gibraltar (United Kingdom): 1.2 km (0.75 mi); Portugal: 1,214 km (754 mi); Morocco (3): 17 km (11 mi)
Sri Lanka	0	0	0	0	
Sudan	6,764	4,203	7	7	Central African Republic: 483 km (300 mi); Chad: 1,360 km (850 mi); Egypt: 1,273 km (791 mi); Eritrea: 605 km (376 mi); Ethiopia: 723 km (449 mi); Libya: 383 km (238 mi); South Sudan: 1,937 km (1,204 mi)
Suriname	1,707	1,061	3	3	Brazil: 597 km (371 mi); French Guiana (France): 510 km (320 mi); Guyana: 600 km (370 mi)
Sweden	2,233	1,388	3	2	Finland (2): 614 km (382 mi) (including 0.5 km [0.3 mi] segment with Åland); Norway: 1,619 km (1,006 mi)
Switzerland	1,852	1,151	8	5	Austria (2): 164 km (102 mi); France: 573 km (356 mi); Italy (2): 740 km (460 mi); Liechtenstein: 41 km (25 mi); Germany (2): 334 km (208 mi)
Syria	2,253	1,400	6	5	Iraq: 605 km (376 mi); Israel: 76 km (47 mi); Jordan: 375 km (233 mi); Lebanon: 375 km (233 mi); Turkey (2): (Note: Tomb of Suleyman Shah is a Turkish territory enclaved by Syria.) 822 km (511 mi)
Taiwan	0	0	0	0	
Tajikistan	3,651	2,269	7	4	Afghanistan: 1,206 km (749 mi); China: 414 km (257 mi); Kyrgyzstan (3): 870 km (540 mi); Uzbekistan (2): (Note: The Tajik village of Sarvan is in Uzbek territory. Uzbekistan has one border with it, and another with the rest of Tajikistan.) 1,161 km (721 mi)
Tanzania	3,861	2,399	8	8	Burundi: 451 km (280 mi); Democratic Republic of the Congo: 459 km (285 mi); Kenya: 769 km (478 mi); Malawi: 475 km (295 mi); Mozambique: 756 km (470 mi); Rwanda: 217 km (135 mi); Uganda: 396 km (246 mi); Zambia: 338 km (210 mi)
Thailand	4,863	3,022	4	4	Cambodia: 803 km (499 mi); Laos: 1,754 km (1,090 mi); Malaysia: 506 km (314 mi); Myanmar: 2,416 km (1,501 mi)
Timor-Leste	228	142	2	1	Indonesia (2): 228 km (142 mi)
Togo	1,647	1,023	3	3	Benin: 644 km (400 mi); Burkina Faso: 126 km (78 mi); Ghana: 877 km (545 mi)
Tonga	0	0	0	0	
Trinidad and Tobago	0	0	0	0	
Tunisia	1,469	913	2	2	Algeria: 1,010 km (630 mi); Libya: 459 km (285 mi)
Turkey	2,648	1,645	9	8	Armenia: 268 km (167 mi); Azerbaijan: 9 km (5.6 mi); Bulgaria: 240 km (150 mi); Georgia: 252 km (157 mi); Greece: 206 km (128 mi); Iran: 499 km (310 mi); Iraq: 352 km (219 mi); Syria (2): 822 km (511 mi)
Turkmenistan	3,736	2,321	4	4	Afghanistan: 744 km (462 mi); Iran: 992 km (616 mi); Kazakhstan: 379 km (235 mi); Uzbekistan: 1,621 km (1,007 mi)
Tuvalu	0	0	0	0	
Uganda	2,698	1,676	5	5	Democratic Republic of the Congo: 765 km (475 mi); Kenya: 933 km (580 mi); Rwanda: 169 km (105 mi); South Sudan: 435 km (270 mi); Tanzania: 396 km (246 mi)
Ukraine	4,663	2,897	8	7	Belarus: 891 km (554 mi); Hungary: 103 km (64 mi); Moldova: 939 km (583 mi); Poland: 526 km (327 mi); Romania (2): 531 km (330 mi); Russia: 1,576 km (979 mi); Slovakia: 91 km (57 mi)
United Arab Emirates	867	539	5	2	Oman (4): 410 km (250 mi); Saudi Arabia: 457 km (284 mi)
United Kingdom (Note: The United Kingdom does not include British Overseas Territories or the Crown Dependencies.) →includes: →England →Northern Ireland →Scotland →Wales	499	310	1	1	Ireland: 499 km (310 mi)
United Kingdom (plus British Overseas Territories and Crown Dependencies) →includes: →Akrotiri and Dhekelia →Anguilla →Bermuda →British Indian Ocean Territory →British Virgin Islands →Cayman Islands →England →Falkland Islands →Gibraltar →Guernsey →Isle of Man →Jersey →Montserrat →Northern Ireland →Pitcairn Islands →Saint Helena, Ascension and Tristan da Cunha →Scotland →South Georgia and the South Sandwich Islands →Turks and Caicos Islands →Wales	652.2	405.3	8	3	Cyprus (6): 152 km (94 mi); Ireland: 499 km (310 mi); Spain: (Note: Via Gibraltar.) 1.2 km (0.75 mi)
United States	12,034	7,478	5	2	Canada (4): 8,893 km (5,526 mi); Mexico: 3,141 km (1,952 mi)
Uruguay	1,564	972	2	2	Argentina: 579 km (360 mi); Brazil: 985 km (612 mi)
Uzbekistan	6,221	3,866	11	5	Afghanistan: 137 km (85 mi); Kazakhstan: 2,203 km (1,369 mi); Kyrgyzstan (6): 1,099 km (683 mi); Tajikistan (2): 1,161 km (721 mi); Turkmenistan: 1,621 km (1,007 mi)
Vanuatu	0	0	0	0	
Vatican City	3.2	2.0	1	1	Italy: 3.2 km (2.0 mi)
Venezuela	4,993	3,103	3	3	Brazil: 2,200 km (1,400 mi); Colombia: 2,050 km (1,270 mi); Guyana: 743 km (462 mi)
Vietnam	4,639	2,883	3	3	Cambodia: 1,228 km (763 mi); China: 1,281 km (796 mi); Laos: 2,130 km (1,320 mi)
Western Sahara	2,046	1,271	3	3	Algeria: 42 km (26 mi); Mauritania: 1,561 km (970 mi); Morocco: 443 km (275 mi)
Yemen	1,746	1,085	2	2	Oman: 288 km (179 mi); Saudi Arabia: 1,458 km (906 mi)
Zambia	5,667	3,521	8	8	Angola: 1,110 km (690 mi); Botswana: 0.15 km (0.093 mi); Democratic Republic of the Congo: 1,930 km (1,200 mi); Malawi: 837 km (520 mi); Mozambique: 419 km (260 mi); Namibia: 233 km (145 mi); Tanzania: 338 km (210 mi); Zimbabwe: 797 km (495 mi)
Zimbabwe	3,066	1,905	4	4	Botswana: 813 km (505 mi); Mozambique: 1,231 km (765 mi); South Africa: 225 km (140 mi); Zambia: 797 km (495 mi)

== Superlatives ==
- Longest land border: China: 22,147 km (13,762 mi)
- Longest land border between two countries:
  1. Canada – United States: 8,891 km (5,525 mi) (Canada–United States border)
  2. Kazakhstan – Russia: 6,846 km (4,254 mi) (Kazakhstan–Russia border)
  3. Argentina – Chile: 5,308 km (3,298 mi) (Argentina–Chile border)
  4. China – Mongolia: 4,677 km (2,906 mi) (China–Mongolia border)
  5. Bangladesh – India: 4,053 km (2,518 mi) (Bangladesh–India border)
  6. China – Russia: 3,645 km (2,265 mi) (China–Russia border)
  7. Mongolia – Russia: 3,485 km (2,165 mi) (Mongolia–Russia border)
  8. Bolivia – Brazil: 3,400 km (2,100 mi) (Bolivia–Brazil border)
  9. China – India : 3,488 km (2,167 mi) (Line of Actual Control)
  10. India– Pakistan : 3,320 km (2,060 mi) (India-Pakistan Border)
  11. Mexico – United States: 3,141 km (1,952 mi) (Mexico–United States border)
- Longest single segments of land borders:
  1. Kazakhstan – Russia: 6,846 km (4,254 mi)
  2. Canada – United States: 6,414 km (3,985 mi) (Note: Via the 48 contiguous states.)
  3. Argentina – Chile: 5,150 km (3,200 mi)
- Shortest land borders between two countries:
  1. Botswana – Zambia: 155 m (509 ft) near Kazungula
  2. Saudi Arabia – Bahrain: 196 m (643 ft) at Passport Island
  3. United Kingdom (Gibraltar) – Spain: 1.22 km (0.76 mi)
  4. Kingdom of Denmark (Greenland) – Canada: 1.28 km (0.80 mi) at Hans Island
  5. Italy – Vatican City: 3.2 km (2.0 mi)
  6. France – Monaco: 4.4 km (2.7 mi)
  7. Turkey – Azerbaijan: 9 km (5.6 mi)
- Shortest single segments of land border:
  1. Morocco – Spain: 75 m (246 ft) at Peñón de Vélez de la Gomera
  2. Romania – Ukraine: 80 m (260 ft) at K Island
  3. Botswana – Zambia: 155 m (509 ft) at what was previously thought to be the Kazungula quadripoint
  4. Saudi Arabia – Bahrain: 196 m (643 ft) at Passport Island
  5. Belgium – Netherlands: 210 m (690 ft) at Baarle-Nassau / Baarle-Hertog
  6. Belgium – Netherlands: 215 m (705 ft) at Baarle-Nassau / Baarle-Hertog
  7. Belgium – Netherlands: 250 m (820 ft) north of Baarle-Nassau / Baarle-Hertog
  8. Belgium – Netherlands: 260 m (850 ft) at Baarle-Nassau / Baarle-Hertog
  9. Finland – Sweden: 320 m (1,050 ft) at Kataja (Note: The irregular border on Märket is 420 m (1,380 ft). Artificial land borders such as the 0.1 m (4 in) border poles in the water at Tornio are not counted.)
- Shortest single segments of land border, if including islands in lakes and rivers:
  1. Norway – Sweden: 5 m (16 ft) Tannsjøen/Tannsjön (59°52′22″N 11°54′59″E)
- Most separate segments of land borders between any two countries or territories:
  1. Belgium – Netherlands: 31
  2. Armenia – Azerbaijan: 6
  3. Belgium – Germany: 6
  4. Kyrgyzstan – Uzbekistan: 6
  5. Cyprus – Akrotiri and Dhekelia (UK): 6
  6. Oman – United Arab Emirates: 4
- Highest number of bordering countries:
  - China: 14 (16 if Hong Kong and Macau are included)
  - Russia: 14 (16 if Abkhazia and South Ossetia are included)

== Artificial border crossings ==
In addition to the above number of land borders per country, some countries have a man-made bridge, causeway or tunnel between each other without having any proper land border. These artificial land borders are usually less than 50 metres (160 ft) long.

Country	Country	Artificial connection
United Kingdom	France	Channel Tunnel
Denmark	Sweden	Øresund Bridge
Singapore	Malaysia	Johor Causeway and Malaysia–Singapore Second Link
Hong Kong	Macau	Hong Kong–Zhuhai–Macau Bridge
Botswana	Zambia	Kazungula Bridge

== See also ==
- Coastline paradox
- Island country
- Landlocked country
- List of countries and territories by land and maritime borders
- List of countries and territories by maritime boundaries
- List of countries that border only one other country
- List of land borders with dates of establishment
- List of divided islands
- List of island countries
- List of political and geographic borders
- List of bordering countries with greatest relative differences in GDP (PPP) per capita
- Separation barrier
