= List of countries that border only one other country =

This is a list of sovereign state that have a land border with only one other. Some on this list have a maritime border with additional countries. Some which are not listed here have no land border but do have a maritime border with a single other state; an example is Sri Lanka.

There are generally three arrangements by which a state would have a single land border:

- an island divided between two states, such as Haiti and the Dominican Republic, or Republic of Ireland and the United Kingdom.
- a peninsula or a semi-enclave, where one state has a land border with a neighbouring one but is otherwise surrounded by sea, while the neighbour borders other states—examples are Portugal (neighbouring Spain), The Gambia (surrounded by Senegal) and Brunei (surrounded by Malaysia).
- the three states that are landlocked enclaves, surrounded by a larger state: San Marino and Vatican City (within Italy) and Lesotho (within South Africa).

Territory leased or ceded by one country to another for perpetual use, but not in sovereignty, such as Guantanamo Bay Naval Base in Cuba, or memorials, such as the American Cemetery in France, do not constitute true territorial borders because the land occupied remains a formal part of the host country.

This list is based on the Correlates of War Direct Contiguity data set, with maritime causeways, bridges and artificial islands not being counted.

== States bordering only one other sovereign state ==
This section considers only sovereign states, not constituent countries like Wales and Scotland, which border only England, or dependent territories such as Gibraltar, which has an international border with Spain but is not legally part of the United Kingdom.

Also not counted are borders on artificial islands such as Passport Island, which is the only land border of Bahrain.

=== Landlocked ===
Country	Neighbour	Border length		Notes
Country	Neighbour	km	mi	Notes
Lesotho	South Africa	909	565	Lesotho is an enclave which is entirely surrounded by South Africa.
San Marino	Italy	39	24	San Marino is an enclave entirely surrounded by Italy.
Vatican City	Italy	3.2	2.0	The Vatican City is an enclave entirely surrounded by Rome, Italy.

=== With coast ===
Country	Neighbour	Border length		Notes
Country	Neighbour	km	mi	Notes
Brunei	Malaysia	381	237	Borders the Malaysian state of Sarawak on the island of Borneo.
Dominican Republic	Haiti	360	220	On the island of Hispaniola
The Gambia	Senegal	740	460	The Republic of the Gambia is bordered to the north, south and east by Senegal.
Haiti	Dominican Republic	360	220	On the island of Hispaniola
Republic of Ireland	United Kingdom	360	220	The Republic of Ireland borders the United Kingdom's Northern Ireland region on the island of Ireland.
Monaco	France	4.4	2.7	
Papua New Guinea	Indonesia	820	510	On the island of New Guinea
Portugal	Spain	1,214	754	
Qatar	Saudi Arabia	60	37	The planned Qatar–Bahrain Causeway would connect Qatar to Bahrain.
South Korea	North Korea	238	148	On the Korean Peninsula, at the Demarcation Line. The two countries are separated by a 4 km wide Demilitarized Zone. South Korea claims the entire Korean Peninsula.
Timor-Leste	Indonesia	228	142	On the island of Timor.
United Kingdom	Republic of Ireland	360	220	On the island of Ireland. The British Overseas Territories of Gibraltar and Akrotiri and Dhekelia border Spain and Cyprus respectively, but these territories are not part of the United Kingdom (see #Dependent territories section).

=== With partially recognized countries ===
Country	Neighbour	Border length		Notes
Country	Neighbour	km	mi	Notes
Cyprus	Northern Cyprus	180	110	Borders the Turkish-occupied territory of Northern Cyprus, formally established in 1983 but only recognized by the Republic of Turkey
Northern Cyprus	Cyprus	180	110	Also has a border with the Dhekelia military base, which is a British Overseas military base between the Republic of Cyprus and the Turkish Northern Republic of Cyprus.

== Causeways, bridges, and tunnels ==
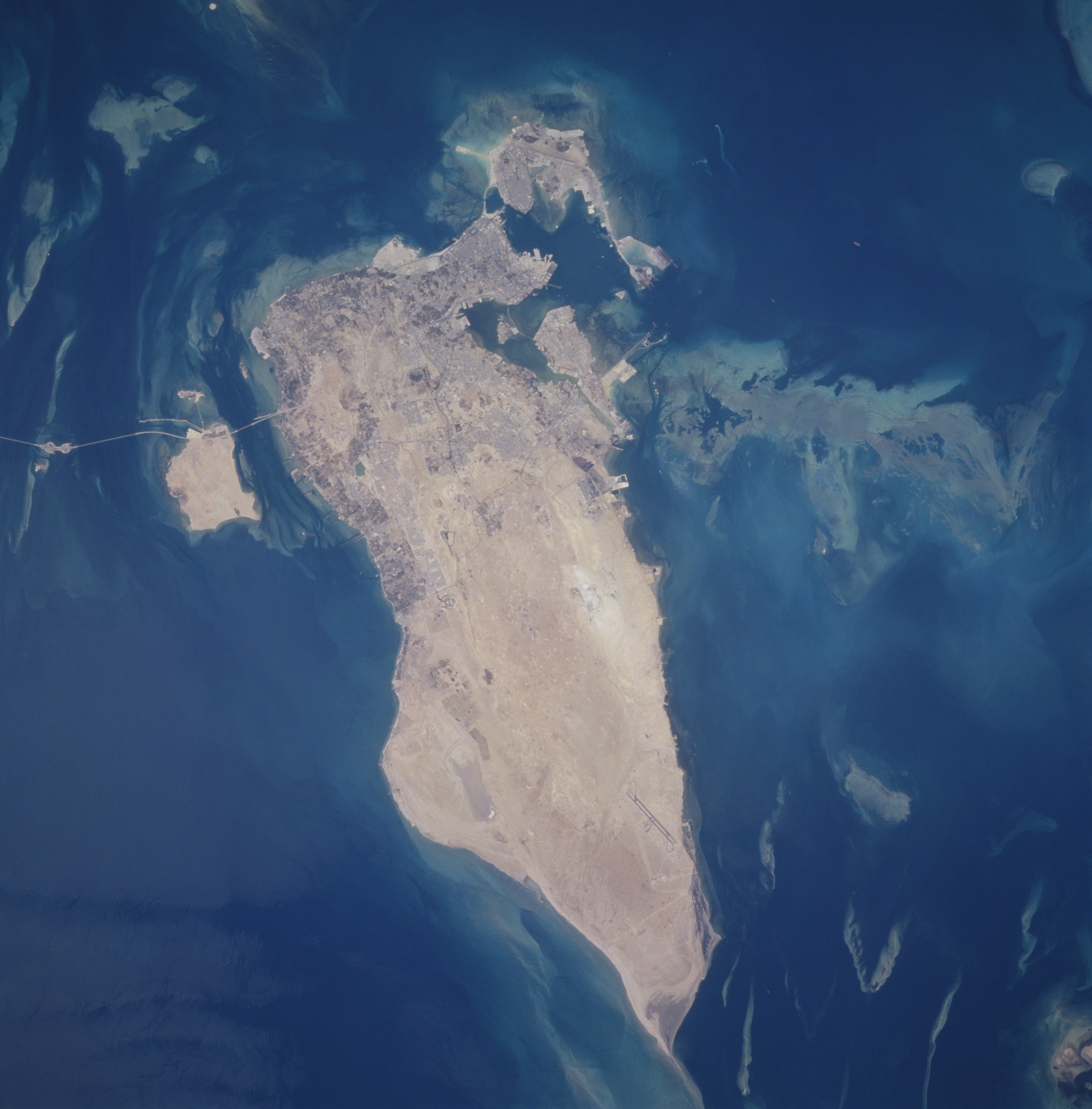
Passport Island, the site of the land border between Bahrain and Saudi Arabia, is seen at the far left. Each nation has a border checkpoint on the island on opposite sides of the border.

Often called fixed crossings or fixed links, transportation corridors constructed to cross bodies of water without any intermittent connections such as ferries or ships may be between different states. These may be considered artificial "persistent" borderpoints for land vehicles or pedestrians, but are not typically considered land borders given their need for continuous operation and maintenance, as well as their ease of volume control or closure by either state. Two countries are islands and have no land borders, but maintain fixed borderpoints with other nations.

Country	Land neighbour	Borderpoint neighbour	Notes				
Country	Land neighbour	Borderpoint neighbour	Notes	Bahrain	None, since Bahrain is an island.	Saudi Arabia	Although an island nation with no natural land borders, Bahrain maintains persistent connection to Saudi Arabia by the King Fahd Causeway at Passport Island.
Singapore	None, since Singapore is cut off by a strait. (Specifically, the Strait of Johor.)	Malaysia	Although an island nation with no natural land borders, Singapore maintains persistent connections to Malaysia by the Johor Causeway and the Malaysia–Singapore Second Link.				

== Dependent territories ==
In some cases, a dependent territory of one nation borders another nation.

Territory	Sovereignty	Neighbour	Border length	Notes
Territory	Sovereignty	Neighbour	km	Notes
Akrotiri and Dhekelia	United Kingdom	Cyprus, Northern Cyprus	108	British sovereign base areas, border the Republic of Cyprus. Dhekelia also borders the Turkish Republic of Northern Cyprus, but the latter is recognised only by Turkey.
Gibraltar	United Kingdom	Spain	1.2	A British overseas territory, occupies a small peninsula and has a 1.2 km (0.75 mi) land border with Spain. Spain claims some of Gibraltar as its own territory.
Ross Dependency	New Zealand	Australia		New Zealand's (largely unrecognised) territorial claim in Antarctica borders only the Australian Antarctic Territory and the unclaimed Marie Byrd Land. (It also touches other claims at the South Pole.)

== Integral parts of sovereign states ==
In most cases, an integral part of a larger country shares a border with another nation.

Territory	Sovereignty	Neighbour	Border length	Notes				
Territory	Sovereignty	Neighbour	Åland	Notes	Finland	Sweden	528.60 m	Autonomous region of Finland. Åland had a dispute in Market Island.
French Southern and Antarctic Lands	France	Australia	5,533,470.05 m	Adélie Land, France's (largely unrecognised) claim in Antarctica borders only the Australian Antarctic Territory. (It also touches other claims at the South Pole.)				
Greenland	Kingdom of Denmark	Canada	1,280 m	A constituent country of the Kingdom of Denmark, Greenland had a border dispute with Canada regarding uninhabited Hans Island. The island is located in the centre of the Kennedy Channel of Nares Strait (between Canada's Ellesmere Island and northern Greenland), which constitutes the agreed maritime border. On June 11, 2022, both countries signed an agreement to split the island, which will come into effect as soon as the parliaments of Canada, Denmark, Greenland, and Nunavut ratify it.				
Saint Martin	France	Kingdom of the Netherlands	16 km	The island is split between two island territories: the northern half, Saint-Martin, is a French overseas collectivity; the southern half, Sint Maarten, is a constituent country of the Kingdom of the Netherlands. Formerly, the northern half belonged to the French overseas department and region of Guadeloupe (until 2007) and the southern half to the Dutch constituent country of the Netherlands Antilles (until 2010).				
Sint Maarten	Kingdom of the Netherlands	France	16 km	The island is split between two island territories: the northern half, Saint-Martin, is a French overseas collectivity; the southern half, Sint Maarten, is a constituent country of the Kingdom of the Netherlands. Formerly, the northern half belonged to the French overseas department and region of Guadeloupe (until 2007) and the southern half to the Dutch constituent country of the Netherlands Antilles (until 2010).				

== Historical ==
Many countries historically had only one neighbour. Some no longer exist while others now have either no land borders or borders with more than one nation due to border changes.

- Canada: bordered only by the United States until 2022, it now shares a short border with the Kingdom of Denmark at Hans Island, with Canada's Nunavut on one side and Denmark's Greenland on the other side.
- Kingdom of Denmark: bordered only by Germany (with a causeway connecting it to Sweden) until 2022 (the constituent country of Denmark still only borders Germany), it now shares a short border with Canada at Hans Island, with Canada's Nunavut on one side and Denmark's Greenland on the other side.
- Korea: bordered only China for several hundred years before 1860, after which a second international border with Russia appeared (approx. 17 km (11 mi) long), according to the Convention of Peking. Following the division of Korea in 1945 only North Korea now shares this border.
- Ciskei: one of the Bantustans of South Africa; created under apartheid, reincorporated on April 27, 1994.
- Venda: another Bantustan, Venda was a true enclave bordering only South Africa and separated narrowly from Zimbabwe by the Madimbo corridor to the north; reincorporated on April 27, 1994.
- Newfoundland: with Canada, until March 31, 1949, when it became the Canadian province of Newfoundland (now named Newfoundland and Labrador).
- Scotland and England: bordered each other until 1707 when they were united as Great Britain by the Acts of Union, see Anglo-Scottish border.
- Japan: bordered Russia on the island of Sakhalin from 1905 until 1910, until Japan inherited the China–North Korea border and the North Korea–Russia border upon the Japanese annexation of Korea. Both Sakhalin and Korea were relinquished after Japan's defeat in World War II in 1945. (See Karafuto Prefecture and Empire of Japan).
- Weihaiwei: 1898–1930, British colony on a leased territory from China's Qing dynasty. Transferred to the Republic of China in 1930.
- Tasmania: bordered only by the Colony of Victoria (on Boundary Islet), until the federation of the Commonwealth of Australia in 1901.
- Hong Kong: bordered China 1860–1997 as a crown colony of the United Kingdom. Transferred to the People's Republic of China in 1997.
- Macau: bordered China until 1999 as a colony of Portugal. Transferred to the People's Republic of China in 1999.

== See also ==
- Island country
- List of countries and territories by land borders
- Landlocked country
- List of countries and territories by land and maritime borders
- List of divided islands
- List of enclaves and exclaves
- List of island countries
- List of political and geographic borders
