= Sastavci, Serbia =

Sastavci Саставци
- Village
- Interactive map of Sastavci
- Location within Serbia
- Coordinates: 43.5582°N 19.4249°E
- Country: Serbia
- Entity: Zlatibor District
- Elevation: 400–500 m (1,300–1,600 ft)
- Time zone: UTC+1 (CET)
  - Summer (DST): UTC+2 (CEST)

Sastavci (Serbian Cyrillic: Саставци) is a village in the Serbian municipality of Priboj, in Zlatibor District. It lies immediately east of the village of Međurečje, which is an exclave of Bosnia and Herzegovina and an enclave within Serbia, a kilometer from the rest of Bosnia and Herzegovina. There are no border controls in or around the village.
