= Međurečje (Rudo) =

Međurečje Међуречје
- Village
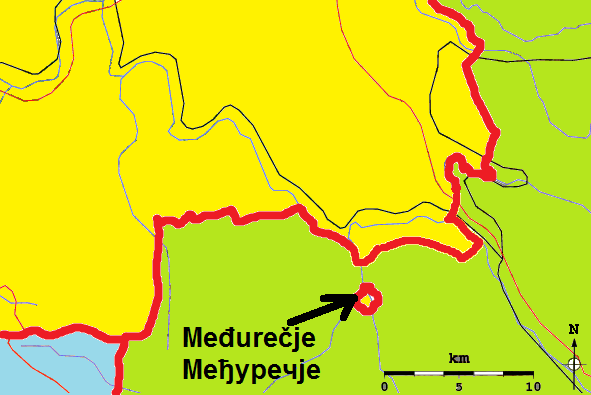
- Map of Međurečje enclave, part of the municipality of Rudo, Republika Srpska (BIH)
- Interactive map of Međurečje
- Coordinates: 43.5561°N 19.4128°E
- Country: Bosnia and Herzegovina
- Entity: Republika Srpska

Area
  - Total: 3.958 km^{2} (1.528 sq mi)
- Elevation: 450 m (1,480 ft)

Population (2013)
  - Total: 171
  - Density: 43/km^{2} (110/sq mi)
- Time zone: UTC+1 (CET)
  - Summer (DST): UTC+2 (CEST)
- Area code: (+387) 58

Međurečje (Serbian Cyrillic: Међуречје) is a village located in the municipality of Rudo, Republika Srpska, Bosnia and Herzegovina. It is surrounded by the Serbian municipality of Priboj, in the Zlatibor District, making it an enclave within Serbia and an exclave of Bosnia and Herzegovina, a kilometer from the rest of its territory. Sastavci is the neighboring village in Serbia.

== Demographics ==
With an area of 395.84 hectares (978.1 acres), Međurečje has 173 inhabitants as of the 2013 census. In 1999, the village had 75 households with a population of 270.

Vital infrastructure in the enclave of Međurečje is tied to the Serbian municipality of Priboj. A majority of the population works in Priboj. However, the land of Međurečje is registered in the municipality of Rudo (Bosnia and Herzegovina), where the population of the village pays its land tax.

== History ==
Historic facts about the formation of the enclave and it ending up within the territory of Serbia are not known, but it is believed to be tied to the period after the 1878 Congress of Berlin, when the Austro-Hungarian and Ottoman empires shared the border and Austria-Hungary was allowed to annex Bosnia and Herzegovina.
