= Passport Island =

Artificial island on the Bahrain–Saudi Arabia border

King Fahd Island
Native name: جزيرة الملك فهد
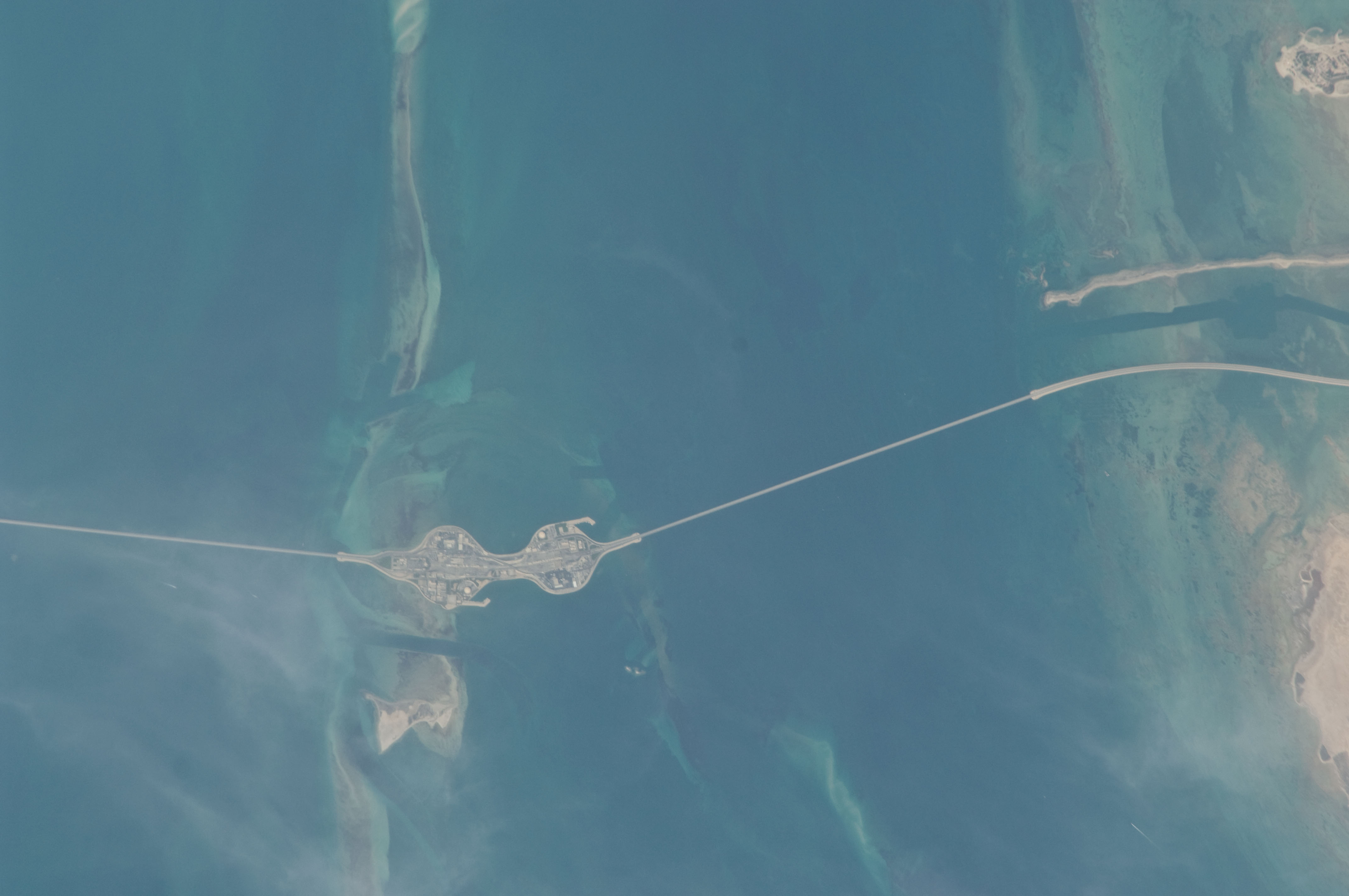
- King Fahd Island as seen from the International Space Station in 2010

- Location within Bahrain

Geography
- Location: Gulf of Bahrain
- Coordinates: 26.184°N 50.324°E
- Archipelago: Bahrain
- Adjacent to: Persian Gulf
- Area: 0.88 km^{2} (0.34 sq mi)
- Length: 2.5 km (1.55 mi)
- Width: 0.6 km (0.37 mi)
- Highest elevation: 3 m (10 ft)

Administration
- Bahrain
- Governorate: Northern Governorate
- Saudi Arabia
- Province: Eastern Province

Additional information
- Time zone: SAST (UTC+03:00)
- ISO code: BH-14
- Official website: www.kfca.com.sa

The Passport Island, (Note: جزيرة الجوازات (romanized: Jazīrat al-Jawāzāt)) known officially as the King Fahd Island, (Note: جزيرة الملك فهد (romanized: Jazīrat al-Malik Fahd)) is an artificial island partitioned between Bahrain and Saudi Arabia in the Gulf of Bahrain. Spread across 2.5 km (1.6 mi), it serves as the sole border crossing between the two countries and is used for connecting Saudi Arabia's Eastern Province to Bahrain's Northern Governorate through the King Fahd Causeway.

== History ==
The King Fahd Causeway opened in 1986 and included the building of the artificial island. Its route was chosen as the shortest path between the island of Bahrain and mainland Saudi Arabia. It is named after King Fahd, then ruler of Saudi Arabia. Initial planning started in 1981 when the Minister of Finance in Saudi Arabia and the Minister of Industrial Development in Bahrain signed an agreement to finance the border crossing between the two states.

== Geography ==
The island is located on the King Fahd Causeway. The artificial island is also named Middle Island, Embankment 4. The buildings of King Fahd Causeway Authority and other government Directorates were erected on the Border Station, as well as two mosques, two Coast Guard towers and two 65-metre-high (213 ft) tower restaurants. The border station also has extensive landscaping all around the islands in addition to the services and road stations. The Border Station was designed as two islands connected by an isthmus, with the west side designated as Saudi Arabian and the east as Bahraini.

The inhabitants on the island are engaged in official duties for incoming citizens and visitors to Saudi Arabia and Bahrain. The Saudi side of the border station has outlets of McDonald's and Kudu and the Bahraini side of the border station has a McDonald's outlet.

== Image gallery ==
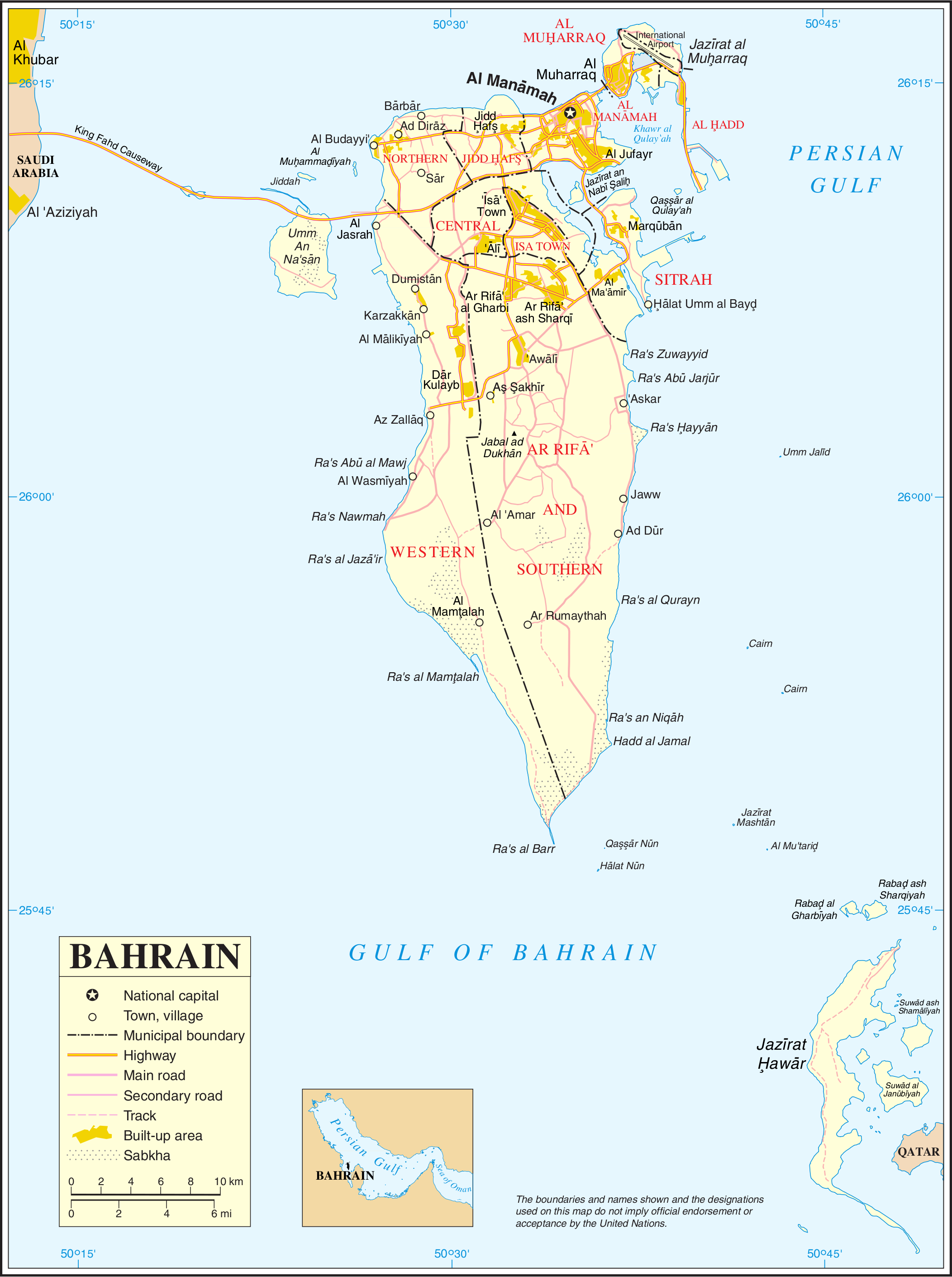
Bahrain Map and the King Fahd Causeway

District Map

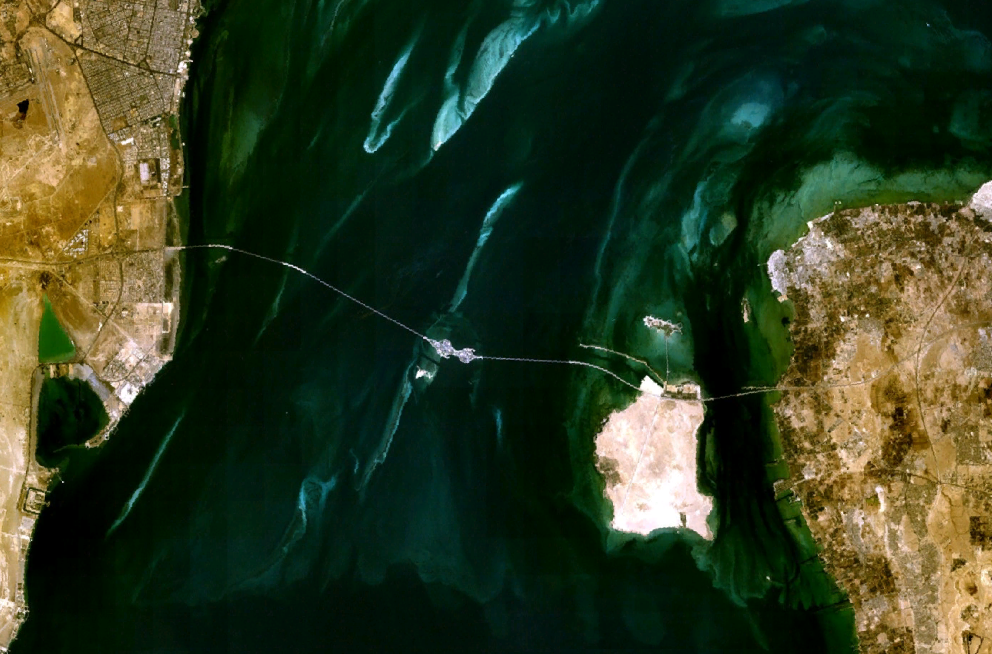
The King Fahd Causeway as seen from space

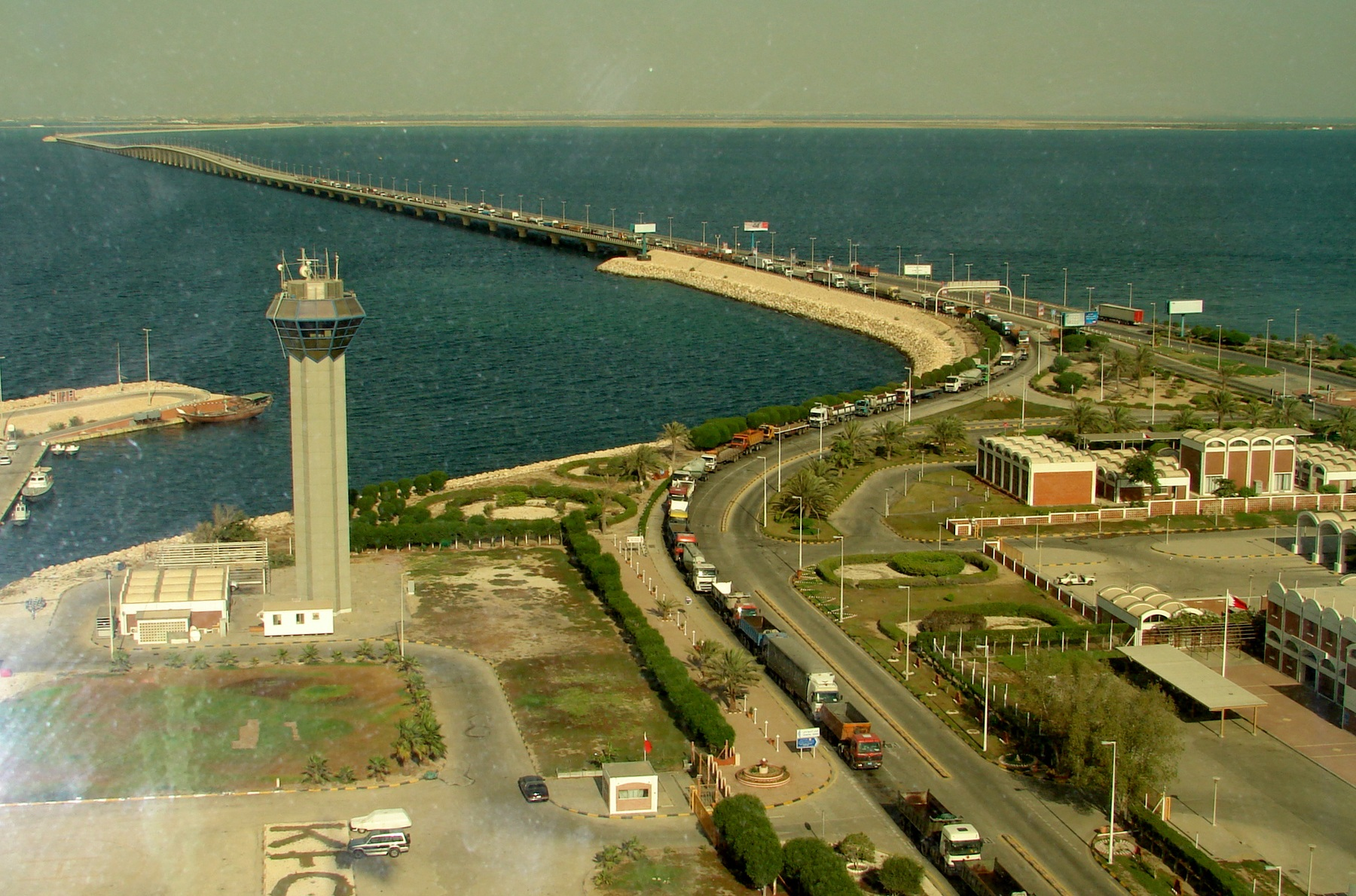
View of the causeway, facing east.

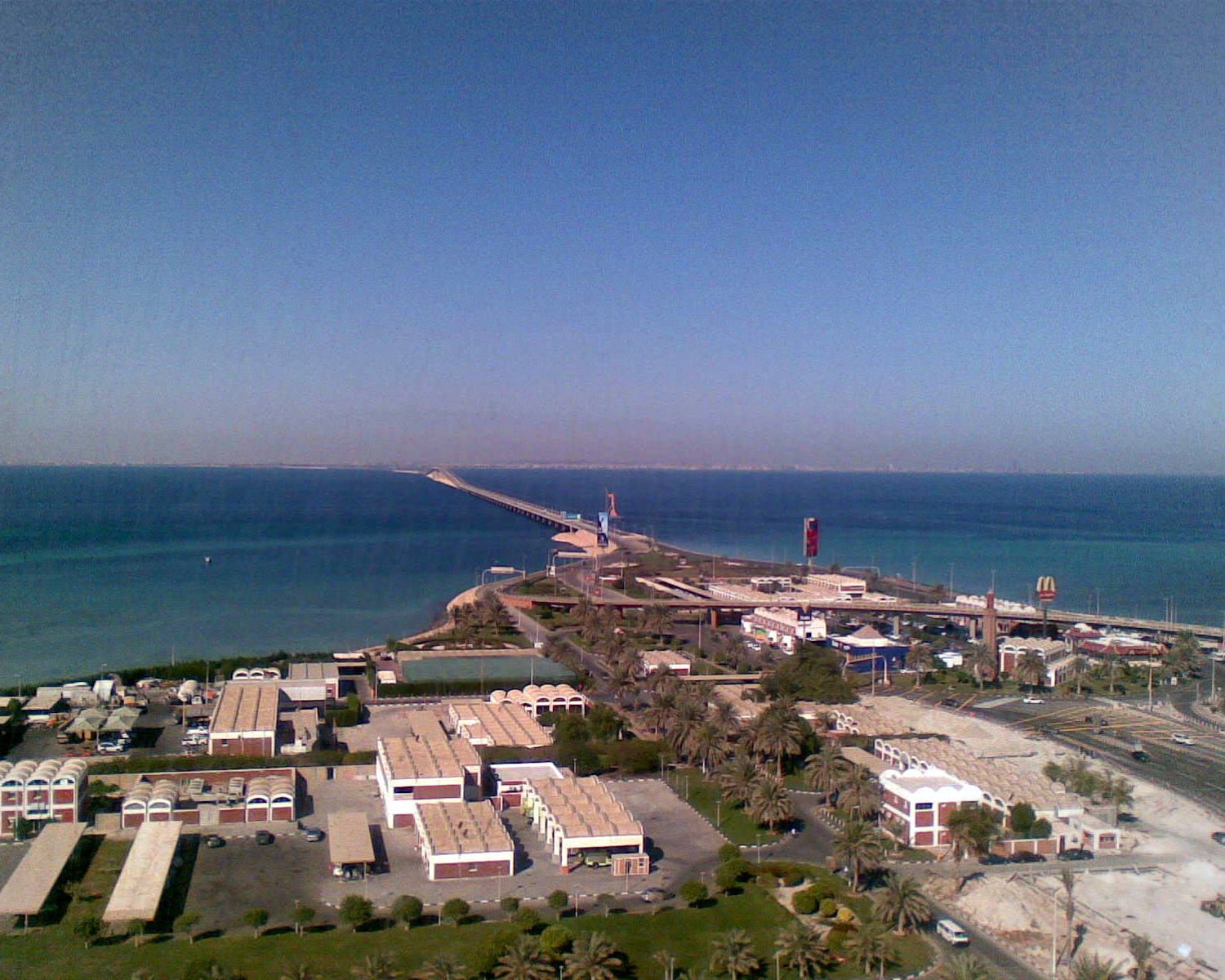
The causeway from the Bahrain side, leading to Saudi mainland.

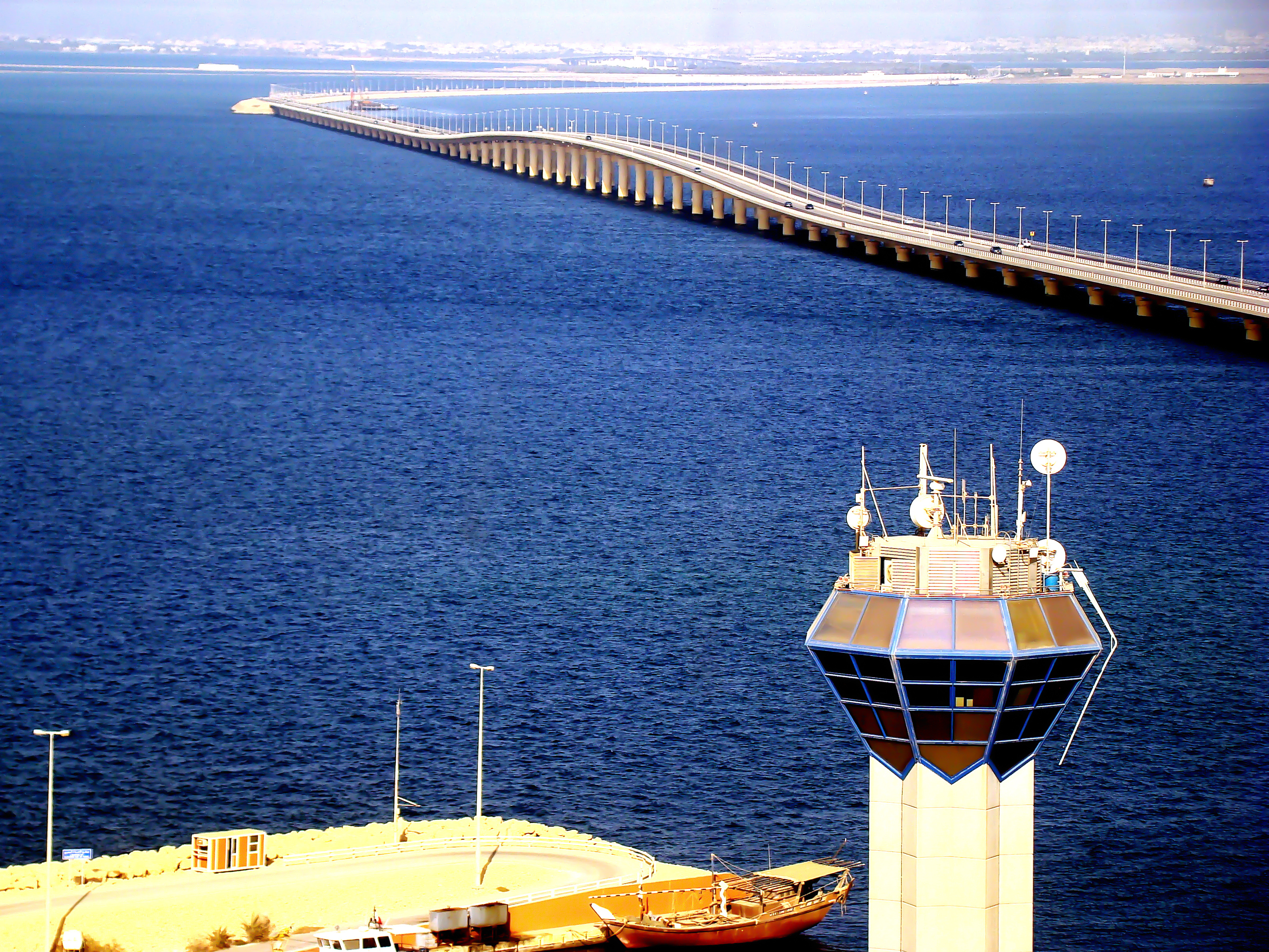
The bridge leading to Bahrain.

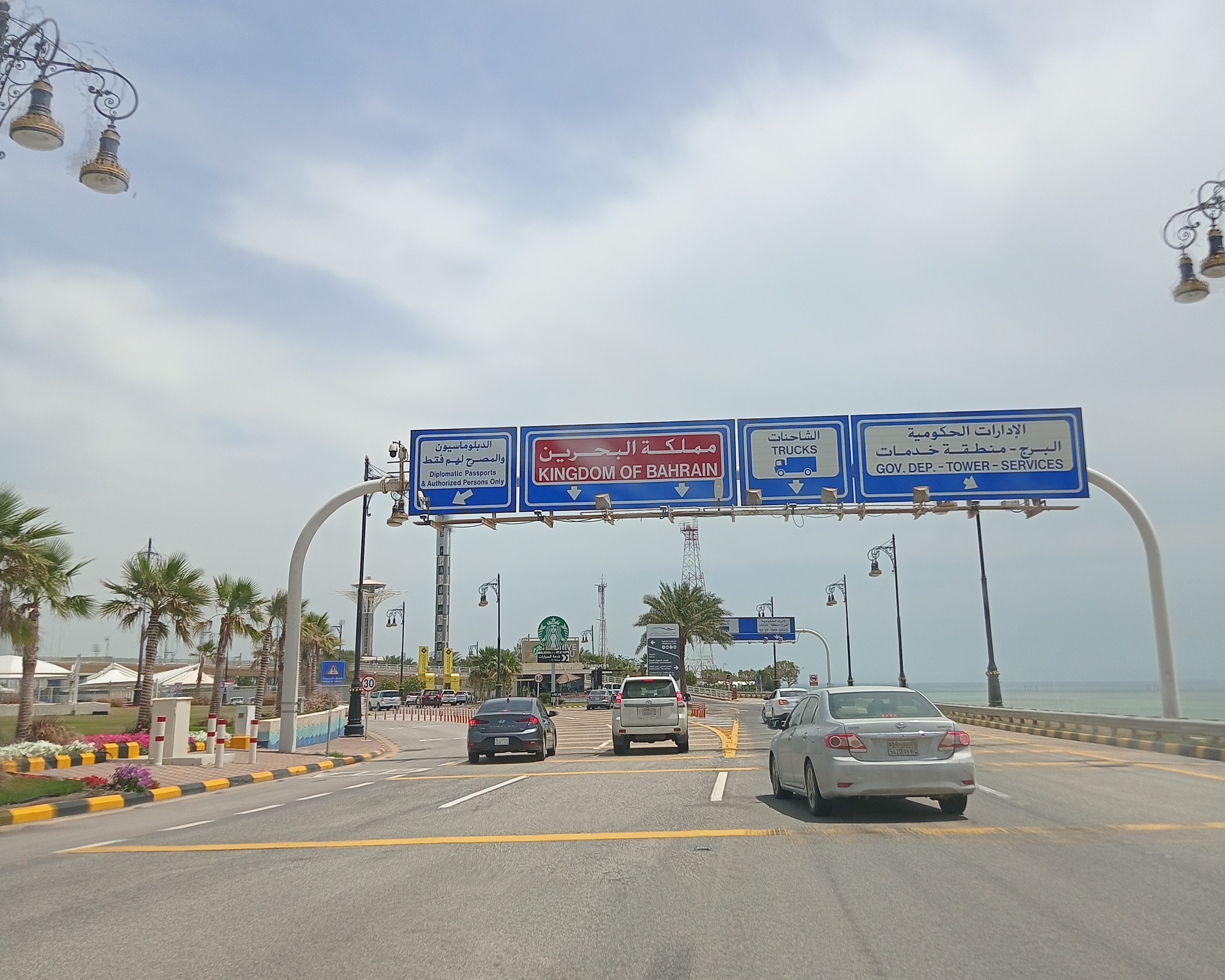
Signboard displayed while heading into Bahrain through the Saudi customs, 2023

== See also ==
- List of islands of Bahrain
- List of islands of Saudi Arabia
