= Tourism in Bahrain =

Tourism in Bahrain: Bahrain receives four million tourists a year. Most visitors are from Arab states of the Persian Gulf but there are an increasing number of tourists from outside the region.

Tourist arrivals of 2024 in %

== Islands ==
- Al Dar Island
- Hawar Islands: a group of islands off the west coast of Qatar in the Gulf of Bahrain
- Durrat Al Bahrain: a land-reclamation development similar to Dubai's Palm Islands.
- Bahrain Bay is a waterfront real estate development situated on the north-east coastline of the Kingdom of Bahrain.

== Malls ==
- Bahrain City Centre, in Manama.
- Dana Mall
- Al Enma Mall
- The Avenues
- Dilmunia Mall
- The Moda Mall
- Atrium Mall
- Seef Mall
- Bahrain Dragon City, in Diyar al Muharraq
- Thai Mart
- Al Marassi Mall

== Museums ==
The Bahrain National Museum has a collection of artifacts from the Kingdom's history dating back to the island's first human inhabitation 5000 years ago.

Beit Al Qur'an, one of the island's most distinctive pieces of architecture, is home to a rare collection of Islamic manuscripts, prints and books. It is located in Hoora, part of the capital, Manama.

The Oil Museum is located near Jabal Ad Dukhan. It was built in 1992 to commemorate the 60th anniversary of the first discovery of oil in the Persian Gulf, it exhibits old photographs, drilling equipment and a working model of an oil rig.

== Other places to visit in Bahrain ==
- Qal'at al-Bahrain a UNESCO World Heritage Site
- Al Fateh Grand Mosque
- Al Areen Wildlife Park
- Tree of Life
- Jasra
- Bahrain International Circuit

== Attractions by Governorate ==
=== Capital ===
- Bahrain Bay
- Bahrain National Museum
- Al Fateh Grand Mosque
- Manama Souq
- Bab Al Bahrain
- Beit Al Quran
- Qal'at al-Bahrain a UNESCO World Heritage Site
- Khamis Mosque
- City Centre Bahrain shopping mall
- Dana Mall
- The Avenues shopping center
- Seef Mall
- Adhari Park

=== Muharraq ===
- Bahrain Pearling Trail a UNESCO World Heritage Site
  - Bu Maher Fort
  - Siyadi House
  - Al-Ghus House
  - Al-Jalahma House
  - Al-Alawi House
  - Badr Ghulum House
  - Fakhro House
  - Murad House
  - Murad Majlis
  - Nūkhidhah House
  - Amārat Ali Rashed Fakhro
- Arad Fort

=== Northern ===
- Jasra
- Barbar Temple
- Diraz Temple
- Ain Umm Sujoor
- Dilmun Burial Mounds a UNESCO World Heritage Site
  - Burial Mound Field near Dar Kulaib
  - Burial Mound Field in Hamad Town
  - Burial Mound Field in Buri
  - Burial Mound Field in A'ali
  - Burial Mound Field in Janabiyah
- Saar Heritage Park

=== Southern ===
- Al Dar Island
- Hawar Islands
- Durrat Al Bahrain
- Al Areen Wildlife Park
- Tree Of Life
- Bahrain International Circuit
- Mountain of Smoke
- Riffa Fort
- First Oil Well

== See also ==
- Visa policy of Bahrain
- Bahrain Grand Prix
- Bahrain International Airshow
- Tree Of Life
- List of tourist attractions in Bahrain
- History of Bahrain
- Hamad Bin Isa Al Khalifa
