= Bahrain light rail network =

Proposed public transport project in Bahrain

Bahrain Metro مترو البحرين

Overview
- Locale: Bahrain
- Transit type: Rapid transit
- Number of lines: 2 (proposed); 2 (planned)
- Line number: Red Line 1 Blue Line 2
- Number of stations: 20 Red Line–Bahrain International Airport - Seef Mall; Length: 13 km (8.1 mi) Blue Line–Juffair - Isa Town; Length: 15.6 km (9.7 mi)
- Daily ridership: 200,000

Operation
- Operator: Ministry of Transportation and Telecommunications
- Character: Elevated

Technical
- System length: 28.6 km (17.8 mi) (Phase-I); 109 km (68 mi) (full completion)

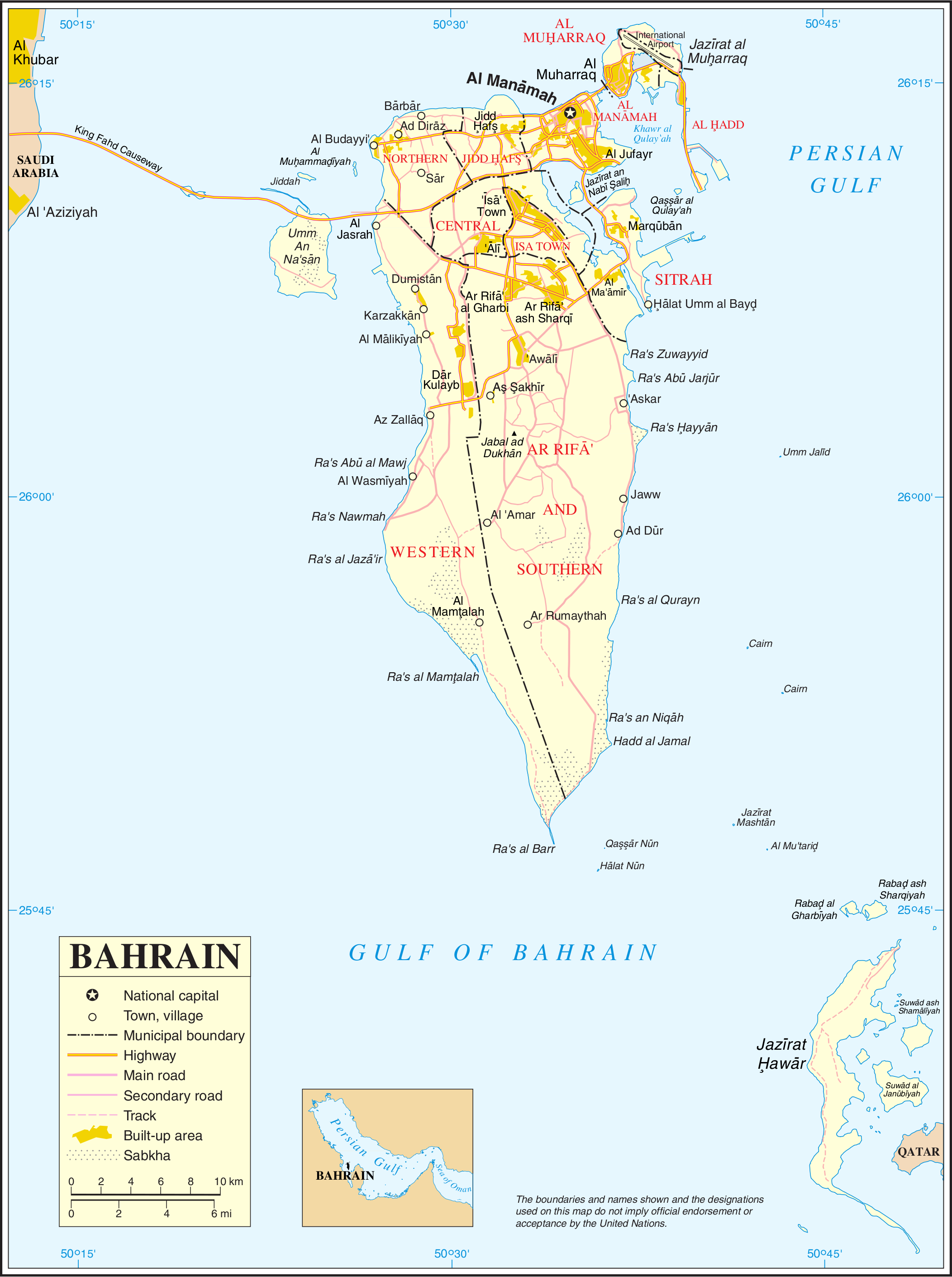
Transport layout of Bahrain

The Bahrain Light Rail Network (Arabic: شبكىة السكة الحديدية البحرين), also known as Bahrain Metro (Arabic: مترو البحرين), is a proposed public transport project, which will serve Manama and its greater metropolitan region, in the capital of the Kingdom of Bahrain.

First proposed in 2008 and under development by the Ministry of Transportation and Telecommunications, the plan calls for a network with a total length of 109 km (68 mi). At full capacity, the light rail network is expected to carry 43,000 passengers an hour, and 200,000 passengers per day.

== Lines ==
A total of 4 lines are proposed, with 2 lines being constructed in Phase-1. Two interchanges are planned at the Bab al Bahrain and Al-Farooq Junction.

=== Red Line 1 ===
The Red Line will be the first operational line of Bahrain Metro, and will start from Bahrain International Airport and end at Seef Mall, via the Airport Avenue and the King Faisal Highway. The line will have 9 stations and will be 13 km (8.1 mi) long. It will also connect The Avenues, Bab al Bahrain, and Bahrain City Centre.

=== Blue Line 2 ===
The Blue Line will be the second line of the network, and will run from Juffair to Isa Town, running at a length of 15.6 km (9.7 mi) with 11 stations. The line will connect the Diplomatic Area, Bab al Bahrain, Salmaniya, Zinj, Tubli, Salmabad, and end at the Educational Area in Isa Town.

== History ==
The project was first unveiled in 2008, with construction planned to start in 2009. However, the project was repeatedly delayed. The project moved ahead in 2018 after the Bilbao-based consultancy firm, IDOM, completed & submitted a feasibility study to the Ministry of Transportation & Telecommunications. The Ministry later announced three tenders in 2019. The project will be developed on a Public Private Partnership (PPP) basis.

The first phase, including about 30 km, with 20 stations, and 2 interchanges, of light rail network, is expected to cost BD453 million. Subsequent phases will cost more.

On 20 February 2023, the Delhi Metro Rail Corporation (DMRC) was selected for the pre-qualification tender process for an international consultancy project to construct the Phase-1 project of the metro project. As it bidded, budgeted, participated and facilitated the project's development, after selection, DMRC signed a Memorandum of Understanding (MoU) with Bharat Earth Movers Limited (BEML) for manufacturing and supplying the rolling stock for the first corridor.

In April 2026, the minister of transportation and telecommunications announced that the metro would be integrated with bus and cycling services as part of a wider mass transit program. Construction has not yet started as of April 2026.

== See also ==
- Transport in Bahrain
