= Bahrain International Exhibition & Convention Centre =

Exhibition centre in Bahrain

The Bahrain International Exhibition & Convention Centre (BIECC, also known as the Bahrain International Exhibition Centre) is an exhibition centre in Manama, Bahrain. It is the country's largest exhibition and convention facility.

During the COVID-19 pandemic in Bahrain, the centre was converted into the country's main testing centre for COVID-19.

== Facilities ==
BIECC has 14,000 square meters of exhibition space and 1,400 square meters of function space. It is able to hold approximately 5,000 delegates and up to 30,000 visitors each day. There BIECC has parking for 800 cars.

== Location ==
BIECC is on the north side of Avenue 28, south of the Shaikh Khalifa Bin Salman Highway. It is surrounded by shopping malls. To the north is the Al Aali Shopping Complex. To the northwest is the Seef Mall. To the west is The Bahrain Mall. To the east is the Dana Mall. To the northeast is the Bahrain City Centre shopping mall.
