= Hoora =

Hoora الحورة Hoorah
- Neighborhood
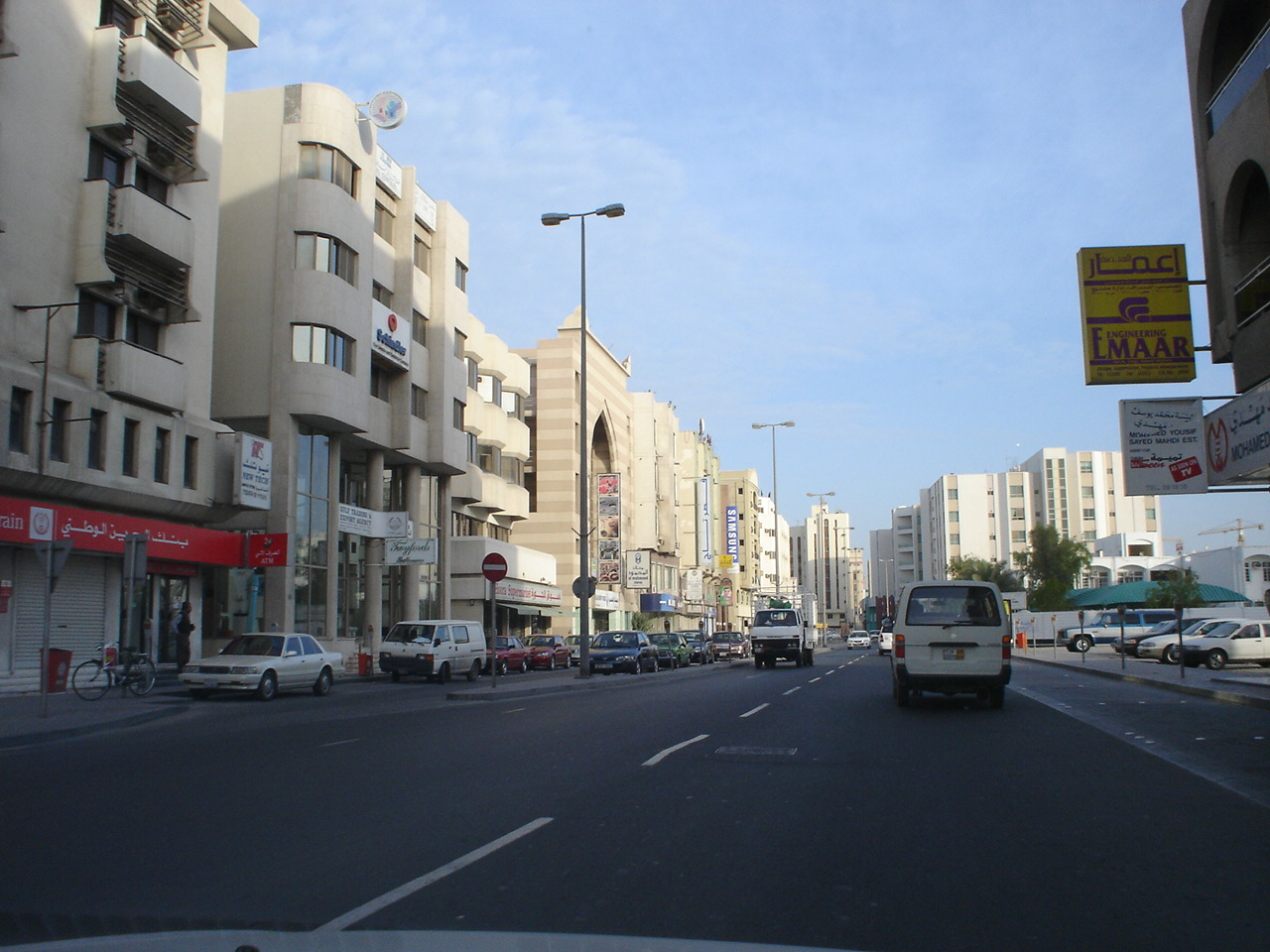
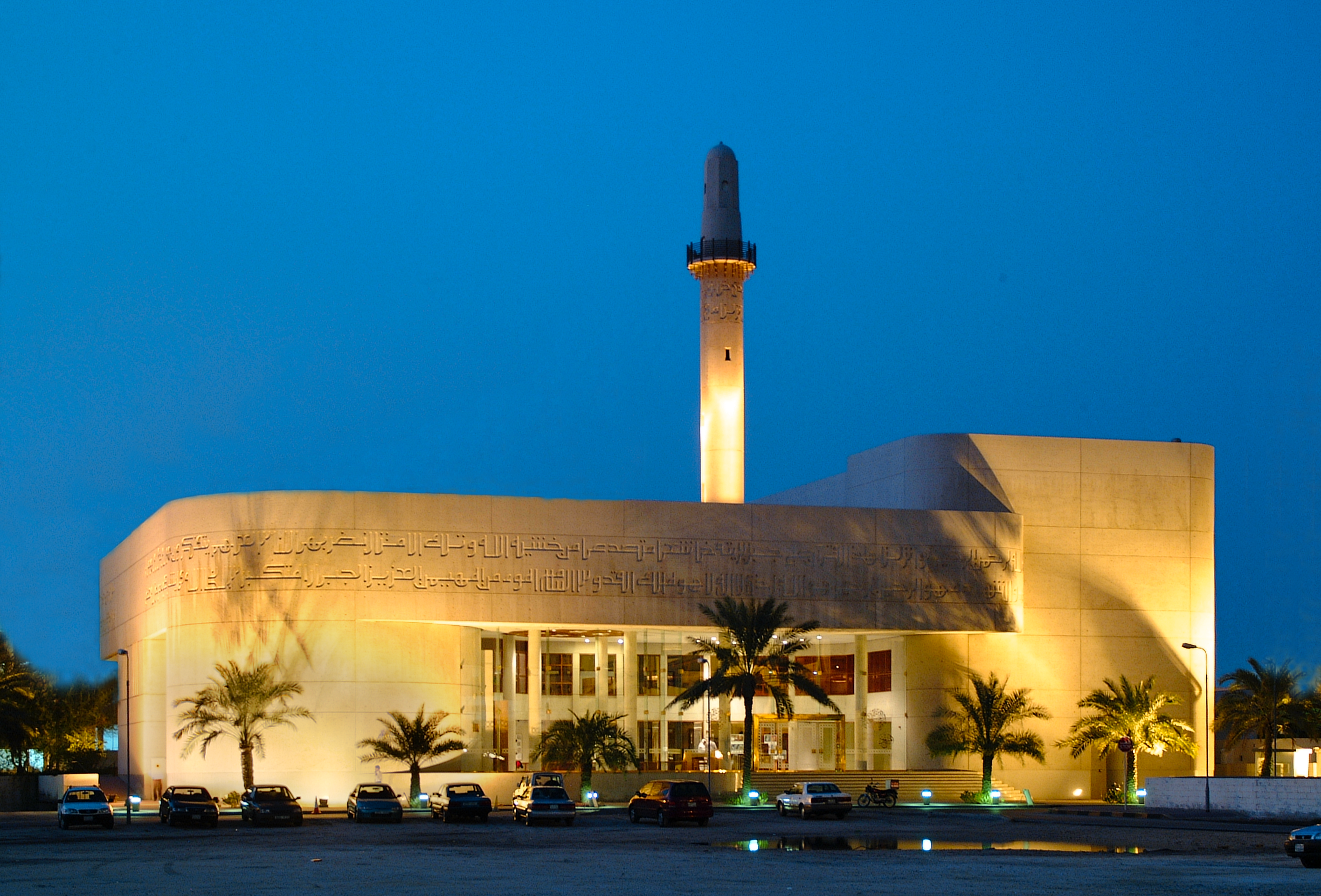
- Exhibition Avenue Beit Al Quran

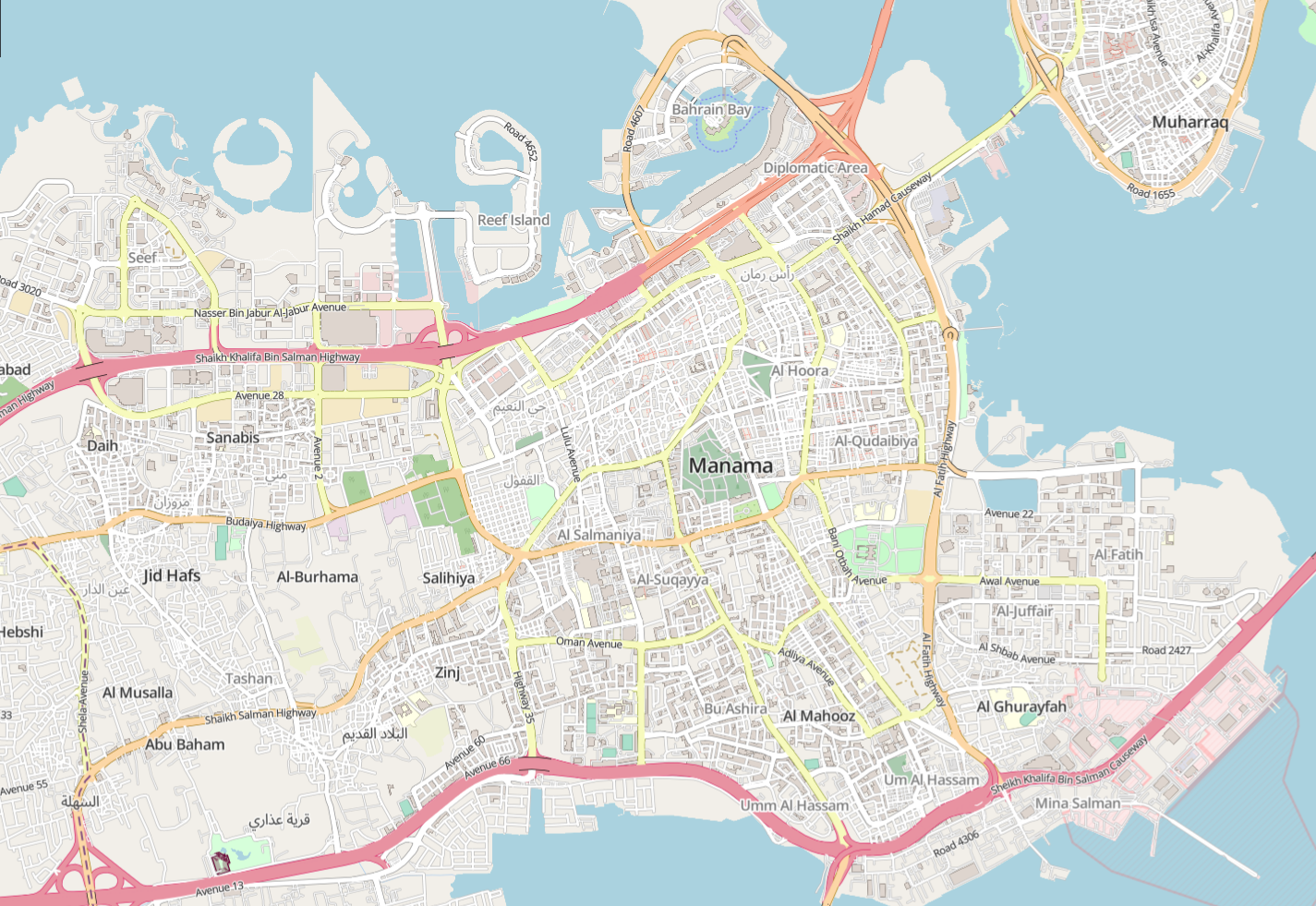
- Map of Manama

- Location in Bahrain
- Coordinates: 26°14′N 50°35.37′E
- Country: Bahrain
- Governorate: Capital Governorate

Hoora (Arabic: الحورة) is a district of Manama, the capital of the Kingdom of Bahrain.

Alongside the Central Business District, Adliya, and Juffair, Hoora is considered one of Manama's nightlife centres, with many bars, hotels, restaurants, pubs and nightclubs (both Arabic and Western), and it is very popular among weekend visitors from Saudi Arabia.

== Etymology ==
The area was named after a woman named حورية, who was killed there. The name of the palm tree where she was killed, "باغ سیدو, Bagh Seedo, 'Forest of Sayyid'," was also changed to "نخل حورية, Nakhl Huriya" in her memory. This suggests that the name "al-Hura" is derived from the name of the woman, حورية.

It's worth noting that the name "Huriya" itself is of Arabic origin and means "free woman" or "nymph." So, the etymology of "al-Hura" can be traced back to this Arabic word, with the specific name being linked to the tragic event that took place there.

== Economy ==
The area contains several tourist attractions, including one of the world's premier collections of Islamic manuscripts and art, Beit Al Quran, and one of Bahrain's most important cultural spots, La Fontaine Contemporary Arts Centre.

Apart from bars and restaurants, the Exhibitions Avenue also houses many business establishments like Computer World, Arabian Printing & Publishing Company, Universal Palace, Gulf Computer Services, "Zainal Mart", "Nesto Supermarket", "Noora Restaurant", Genius Computer" Etc.

The GOSI Complex is a shopping complex that is also located on Exhibitions Avenue. The Abu Bakr Siddeeq mosque is a landmark on Exhibitions Avenue and is located beside the Hoora Police Station. Much of the architecture of Hoora is in the traditional Gulf style and dates back to the beginning of the 20th century.

=== Exhibition Avenue ===
Exhibition Avenue (Arabic: شارع المعارض) is the most prominent road in Hoora. The area was initially the site of makeshift tents for exhibition conventions in the late 1970s, hence its name. The road is now frequently regarded as the country's red light district, with large numbers of sex workers and revelers frequenting the area particularly on weekends. The area is the subject of much controversy nationally as sex work is illegal in Bahrain; as such, the avenue has been discussed repeatedly in the country's national parliament by conservative MPs requesting a crackdown on the area. Multiple court cases against groups operating illegal prostitution rings and drug racketeering in the area were reported by local media in the 2010s. In 2016, some hotels in the area denied renting out rooms to single women as a result.

== See also ==
- Tourism in Bahrain
- Culture of Bahrain
