= List of shopping malls in Bahrain =

This is a list of shopping malls in Bahrain.

== Manama ==
=== Bahrain Bay ===
Galleria mall.

Hala Plaza.

- The Avenues

=== Suwayfiyah ===
- Dana Mall

=== Naim ===
- Marina Mall

=== Manama Center ===
- Moda Mall

=== Seef District ===
- City Centre Bahrain
- Seef Mall

=== Seqaya ===
- Tala Plaza

=== Juffair ===
- Juffair Mall
- Oasis Mall

=== Zinj ===
- Hala Plaza
- Galleria

== Isa Town ==
- Al Seef Isa Town Mall
- Once Mall

Ramli Mall

== Janabiya ==
- El Mercado Mall
- Kingdom Mall
- The Atrium

== Sanabis ==
- The Bahrain Mall

== Muharraq ==
- Al Hidd Mall "Lulu"
- Dragon City
- Lagoon Park - Amwaj Island
- Lulu HyperMarket/Muharraq Central Market- Muharraq
- Oasis Mall
- Mall of Dilmunia
- Marassi Galleria
- Seef Al Muharraq Mall Bahrain

== Riffa ==
=== Bu Kowarah ===
- Al Enma Mall

=== Buhair ===
- Oasis Mall

=== Wadi al Sail ===
- Wadi Al Sail Mall

== Saar ==
- Saar Mall

== Sanad ==
- Al Alawi Mall

== Sitra ==
- Sitra Mall

== Tubli ==
- Ansar Gallery

== See also ==
- List of tourist attractions in Bahrain
