= Seef Mall =

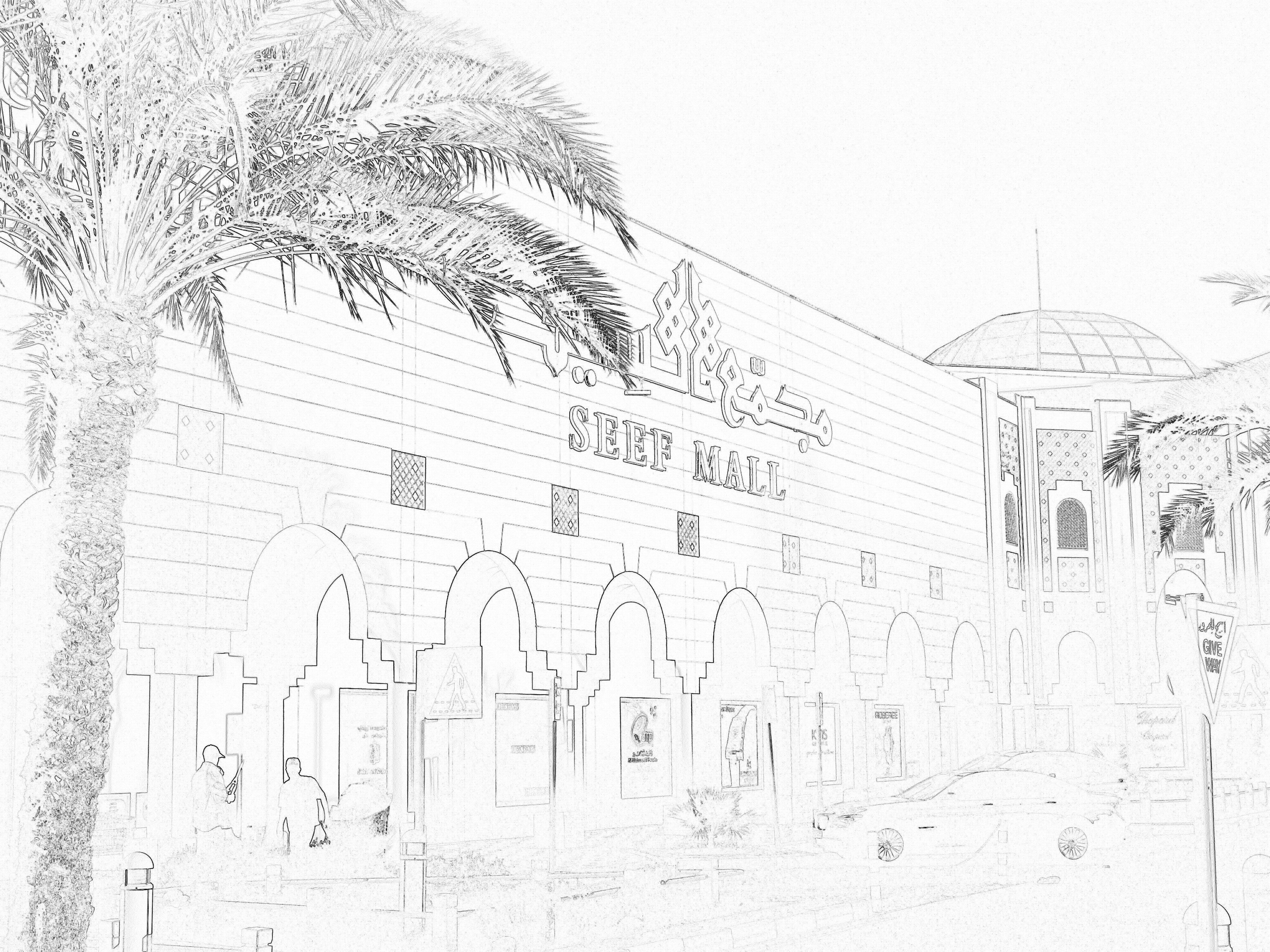
- Location: Seef, Manama, Bahrain
- Coordinates: 26°13′55.38″N 50°32′12.33″E
- Address: Shaikh Khalifa bin Salman Highway
- Opened: October 6, 1997; 29 years ago
- Owner: Seef Properties BSC (Seef)
- Floors: 2
- Website: www.seef.net

Seef Mall (Arabic: مجمع السيف) is a commercial mall in the Kingdom of Bahrain. Managed by Seef Properties, the mall is located in the Seef district of the capital city, Manama. At its peak, the mall attracted an average of 25,000 visitors a day.

Seef Mall was the largest mall in Bahrain until 2008, when it was superseded by the opening of the Bahrain City Centre.

== Geography ==
The mall is situated in the Seef district of Manama in the north of Bahrain, close to the village of Sanabis. The mall encompasses an area of 135,000 square metres, of which 78,000 square metres are gross leasable area. The mall is directly connected to Fraser Suites at the western end of the mall. The Al Aali Shopping Complex is located near the eastern end at the entrance near the Marks and Spencer store. To the south is the Shaikh Khalifa Bin Salman Highway. Beyond the highway to the south is The Bahrain Mall. To the southeast is the Bahrain International Exhibition & Convention Centre.

== History ==
Seef Mall opened its doors in 1997 and was widely regarded as the first 'authentic' regional mall in the country. It attracted visitors from Bahrain, neighbouring Saudi Arabia, and across the Gulf. It first hosted 220 different stores and four anchoring department stores including Marks and Spencer, Debenhams, BHs, and Toys R Us. The mall also hosted two different cinema complexes and two food courts at opposing ends.

In 2007, it was named by the Oxford Business Group as "Bahrain's most successful real estate venture to date". Capitalising on the mall's financial success, the Bahraini government sold its 48% stake in the parent company Seef Holdings, which managed malls and properties at 45 locations across the Kingdom, in an IPO in April 2007, with favourable terms for Bahraini investors.

== See also ==
- List of shopping malls in Bahrain
- Manama incident
