= Prostitution in Bahrain =

Prostitution in Bahrain is illegal but it has gained a reputation in the Middle East as a major destination for sex tourism.

The Bahrain Youth Society for Human Rights reported in 2007 that there were more than 13,500 prostitutes in the country and that the number was rising.

Sex trafficking is a problem in the country.

Bahraini conservative Al Asala bloc sought to curb prostitution by banning women from certain countries, but their proposal failed, as there were worries that Bahrain’s diplomatic relations might deteriorate with the countries targeted in Al Asala’s anti-prostitution drive.

According to the U.S. Department of State, women and men from South and Central Asia, and East Asia; East and West Africa, Uzbekistan, and other countries are subjected to forced labor and sex trafficking in Bahrain.

== Overview ==
During the era of slavery in Bahrain, prostitution was connected to slavery. The Islamic Law formally prohibited prostitution. However, since the principle of concubinage in Islam in Islamic Law allowed a man to have intercourse with his female slave, prostitution was practiced by a pimp selling his female slave on the slave market to a client, who was allowed to have intercourse with her as her new owner, and who after intercourse returned his ownership of her to her pimp on the pretext of discontent, which was a legal and accepted method for prostitution in the Islamic world. Slavery in Bahrain was however abolished in 1937.

Prostitution is common, especially in Manama. Most of the prostitution occurs in bars and hotels, but some prostitutes, mainly Russian and Central Asian, attract customers in the malls. There is also some street prostitution. In Bahrain, the prostitution is organized. Most of the prostitutes are foreign: Russian, Thai, Filipino, Ethiopian, Bangladeshi, Chinese and South Korean. Kenyan women have also been known to engage in prostitution. Each hotel or bar tends to have one nationality of prostitutes: One hotel in the Juffair district has bars on different levels where each level 'offers' a specific nationality of prostitute. Filipino and Chinese prostitutes work in Australian outback-themed bars. In some hotels the women will knock on guests doors late at night looking for customers. Alcohol and prostitution is opposed by Bahrain's majority Shia population. Bills to prohibit alcohol have been passed by the Shia-ruled parliament but revoked by the Sunni–ruled Shura Council of Bahrain. Hotels and bars tolerate the prostitutes as it brings in male customers and increases alcohol sales.

Many of the customers are Saudis who drive to Bahrain where the laws are far less strict than in their homeland, especially where sex and alcohol are concerned.

=== Sin city ===
In 2009, Manama was placed at number 8 in the top 10 "sin cities" of the world by AskMen magazine. This prompted a clampdown during which 300 prostitutes and pimps were arrested within the first week, and the Al Asalah parliamentary bloc proposing that the country should stop issuing visas to Russian, Thai, Ethiopian, and Chinese women to stop prostitutes from entering the country. The proposal was not adopted.

== Legal situation ==
Prostitution and related activities are prohibited by the Bahrain Criminal Code:

Chapter 3 - Immorality & Prostitution

- Article 324 - Entices or assists another to commit an act of immorality or prostitution (unspecified prison sentence, max 5 years if the victim is under 18)
- Article 325 - Forcing a person to commit acts of immorality or prostitution by coercion, threat or deceit (2 - 7 years imprisonment, or 3 - 10 if the victim is under 18)
- Article 326 -

1. Totally or partly living on the proceeds of that person's own immorality or prostitution (max 5 years)
2. Totally or partly living on the proceeds of another person's own immorality or prostitution (max 5 years)
3. Protecting another person engaged in immorality or prostitution (max 5 years)

- Article 327 - Increase the penalty of Articles 324, 325 & 326 if the perpetrator is the spouse, in-law, guardian or person having authority over (max 15 years)
- Article 328 - Establishes or runs, or assists in the running, a premises of immorality or prostitution (2 - 5 years)
- Article 329 -

1. Soliciting in a public place for immorality or prostitution (max 2 years)
2. Any notices containing an invitation or implying temptation are considered soliciting

- Article 330 - Any perpetrator of immorality or prostitution shall be taken for a medical examination. If they are suffering from a venereal disease, a court will order them to a medical institute for treatment.
- Article 331 - Any foreigner convicted of immorality or prostitution may be deported, either totally or for a period of not less than 3 years

The Ministry of Interior Criminal Investigation Directorate and the Capital Governante's Municipal Council raid flats or hotels if there are complaints of "unlawful activities" by neighbours.

The courts may issue deportation orders against foreign prostitutes on conviction or if it is in the "public interest". In 2016 Bahraini MP Jamal Dawood proposed that non-Bahrainis caught in cases involved in cases of prostitution should be deported immediately and banned from the country for life. The proposal was rejected as it would be contradictory to human rights. Majority of the MPs supported the committee's decision and rejected Dawood's proposal.

Bahrain's Aliens Act allows immigration officials to deny entry to people convicted of crimes elsewhere, including prostitution. They can also be denied entry for unspecified "health reasons".

== History ==
Prostitution has been practised in Bahrain for many years.

After WW1, many foreign workers, especially from Persia, Iraq and India, came to the country fueling demand for prostitution. There were two areas designated for brothels, one in Gulba, west Manama and the other in Muharraq. Both male and female prostitutes worked in the brothels. In 1937 it was decreed prostitutes could only live and work in these areas, any operating outside these areas were to be deported. Most of the female prostitutes were from Persia, Iraq and Oman, and were known as "girls or daughters of love". The Persians charged the highest prices, then Iraqis and Omanis, respectively. The male prostitutes were mainly Omani boys. There were also Bahraini women who were the children of former slaves also working in these areas. The two areas declined in the 1970s with the building of hotels and prostitution spreading to the hotels.

The nationality of female prostitutes changed through the 1980s and 1990s. During the 1980s, Filipino women could be seen in prostitution. Sri Lankans were available on certain streets in various areas of Manama. Also, there continues to be a main street in Adliya commonly referred to as the “meat market,” where Filipinas walk about at night. New nationalities of prostitutes have been seen during the 1990s. Since the break down of communism, ex-Soviet women have entered into prostitution.

After the Saudi causeway was opened in 1986, many Saudis came to the country because of its more relaxed attitude to sex and alcohol. The Saudi visitors who wanted to "party", greatly increased the demand for prostitution.

Prostitutes of different nationalities have come to the country at different times. Following the collapse of communism, Russian prostitutes came to the country, and 1996 saw the arrival of Bosnians. Russian women were available in some of the expensive hotel restaurants frequented by Saudis, and outside two and three-star hotels and other restaurants frequented by other tourists.

== Sex trafficking ==
Bahrain is a destination country for women subjected to sex trafficking, primarily from Bangladesh, India, Pakistan, Philippines, Nepal, Egypt, Jordan, Yemen, Thailand, Syria, and Kenya.

In 2015, the government convicted 17 sex traffickers and imposed 10-year prison terms plus fines and deportation. At the close of the reporting period, five trafficking cases, and four from the previous year, remained ongoing. Officials reported three government employees were allegedly complicit in potential trafficking crimes. Two of these cases remained under investigation and one was in the trial phase at the conclusion of the reporting period. The media reported the arrest of two police officers—one former and one current—for their role in the sex trafficking of foreign women; however, it was unclear if the government and media were reporting the same two cases.

Two Russian women were deported from Bahrain to Russia in 2016 for their involvement in a sex trafficking ring. They lured women from the Urals to Bahrain between 2011 and 2016 with promises of work. Once there they were forced into prostitution. One of the women was given a six-year jail term for trafficking 23 women to Bahrain for prostitution, by the Russian courts in June 2017.

The United States Department of State Office to Monitor and Combat Trafficking in Persons ranks Bahrain as a 'Tier 1' country.
