= Juffair Mall =

Shopping mall in Manama, Bahrain

- Location: Juffair, Manama, Bahrain
- Coordinates: 26.217940°N 50.607275°E
- Opened: 15 December 2015
- Owner: VKL Holding and Al Namal Group of Companies
- Floors: 5

Juffair Mall is a shopping mall in the Juffair neighbourhood of Manama, the capital city of Bahrain.

The mall opened on 15 December 2015. A Lulu Hypermarket opened there on 6 January 2016, the 120th Lulu store in the world. The opening ceremony was patronised by Bahrain's Deputy Prime Minister, Shaikh Khalid bin Abdullah Al Khalifa.

== Stores ==
- LULU Hyper Market
- Centerpoint
- Golden Gallery For Fragrances
- Mukta Cinemas
- Matrix (Playing area for kids & adults)
- National pharmacy

== See also ==
- List of shopping malls in Bahrain
