= The Avenues (Kuwait) =

Largest shopping mall in Kuwait

Coordinates: 29.3032°N 47.9354°E

- Founded: 9 April 2007; 19 years ago
- Headquarters: Rai, Farwaniya Governorate, Capital Governorate
- Owner: Mabanee Company
- Website: The-Avenues.com

The Avenues Mall is the largest shopping mall and leisure destination in Kuwait, and is also considered to be one of the largest in the Persian Gulf region. The mall is located in the Rai area (Farwaniya Governorate), and borders the 5^{th} Ring Road from the south and Al Ghazali Highway from the east. It was first inaugurated in April 2007, under the patronage of the now deceased Emir of Kuwait at the time, Sheikh Sabah Al-Ahmed Al-Jaber Al-Sabah.

The Avenues Mall was the winner of the ICSC Gold Award, specifically under the Expansion and Design Category in the region of the Middle East & North Africa. With a total area that roughly sums up to 1,200,000 m^{2}, it is considered to be one of the largest shopping malls in the world. It features 16 districts, more than 1,400 stores, and parking garages and spaces that can accommodate nearly 17,000 vehicles. Across a span of twelve years, The Avenues has spent a total of $3,061,500,000 USD in building and construction. The mall is built under and maintained by Mabanee Company K.P.S.C., Gensler, and Pace.

== Construction & Directory ==
=== Phasic Construction Timeline ===
Phase Number	Date Of Completion
Phase I	April 2007
Phase II	August 2009
Phase III	November 2012
Phase IV	March 2018

=== Mall Maps ===
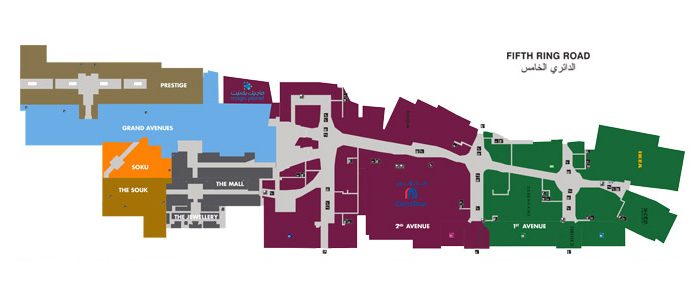
The Avenues Mall's Map (Phases I-III)

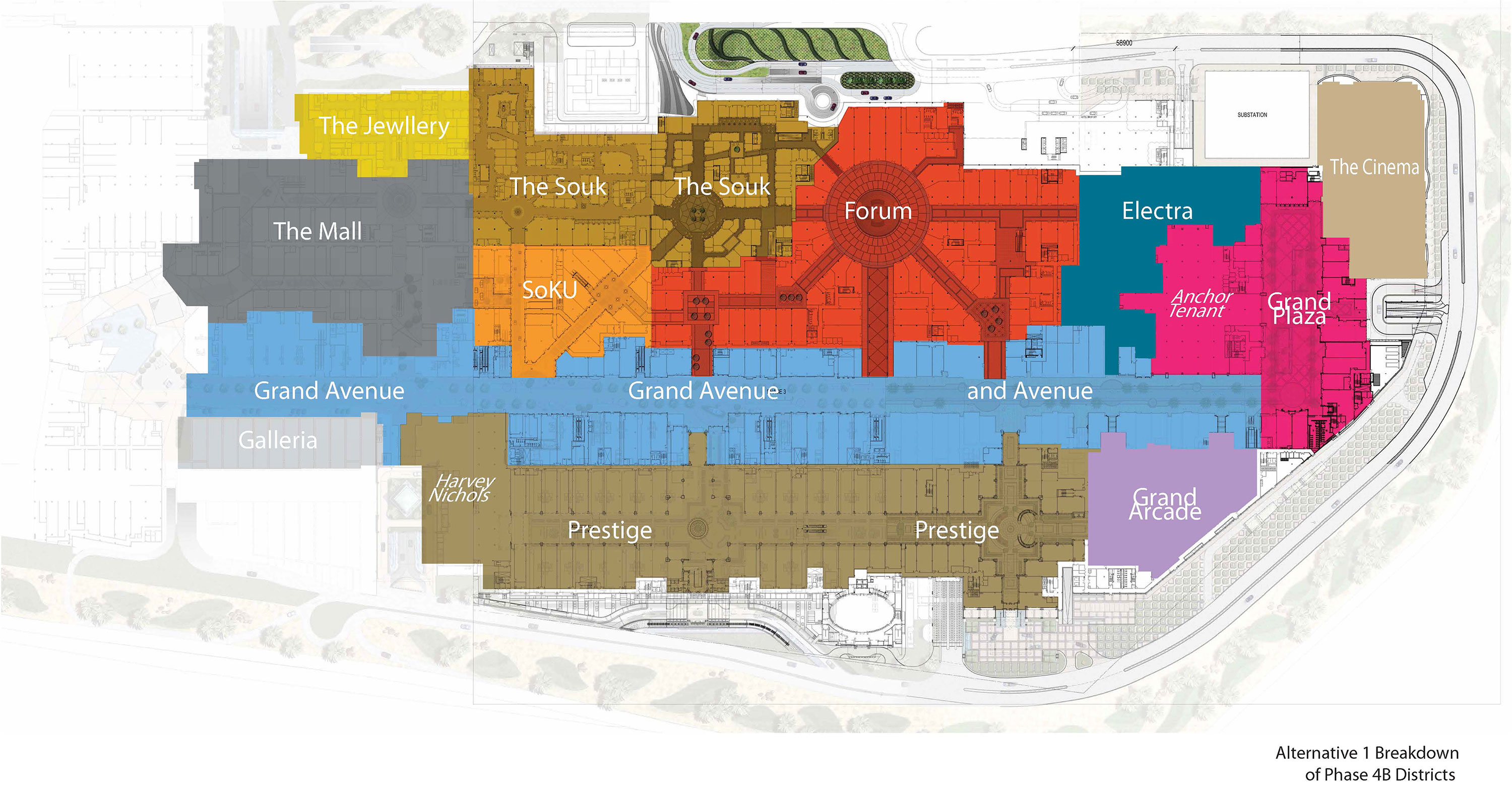
The Avenues Mall's Map (Phases III-IV)

=== District Directory ===
Phase I	Phase II	Phase III	Phase IV
1^{st} Avenue	2^{nd} Avenue (B)	Grand Avenue (A)	Grand Avenue (B)
1^{st} Avenue	2^{nd} Avenue (B)	Prestige (A)	Prestige (B)
1^{st} Avenue	2^{nd} Avenue (B)	The Souk (A)	The Souk (B)
1^{st} Avenue	2^{nd} Avenue (B)	SoKu	Grand Plaza
2^{nd} Avenue (A)	2^{nd} Avenue (B)	The Mall	The Forum
2^{nd} Avenue (A)	2^{nd} Avenue (B)	Boutique Zone (The Jewellery)	Electra
2^{nd} Avenue (A)	2^{nd} Avenue (B)	Galleria	The Gardens
2^{nd} Avenue (A)	2^{nd} Avenue (B)	The Bazaar	The Arcades
2^{nd} Avenue (A)	2^{nd} Avenue (B)	The Bazaar	The Cinema

== Gates, Main Entrances, & Parking ==
District	Parking/Entrance Bullets
1^{st} Avenue	Descriptive text
2^{nd} Avenue	Descriptive text
Galleria	Descriptive text
The Bazaar	Descriptive text
Boutique Zone (The Jewellery)	Descriptive text
The Souk	Descriptive text
The Mall	Descriptive text
SoKu	Descriptive text
Grand Avenue	Descriptive text
The Gardens	Descriptive text
The Arcades	Descriptive text
The Cinema	Descriptive text
Grand Plaza	Descriptive text
Electra	Descriptive text
The Forum	Descriptive text
Prestige	Descriptive text

== Districts ==
The Avenues is home to a number of districts (16 to be exact), which are as follows:

=== 1^{st} Avenue ===
1st Avenue's District Logo

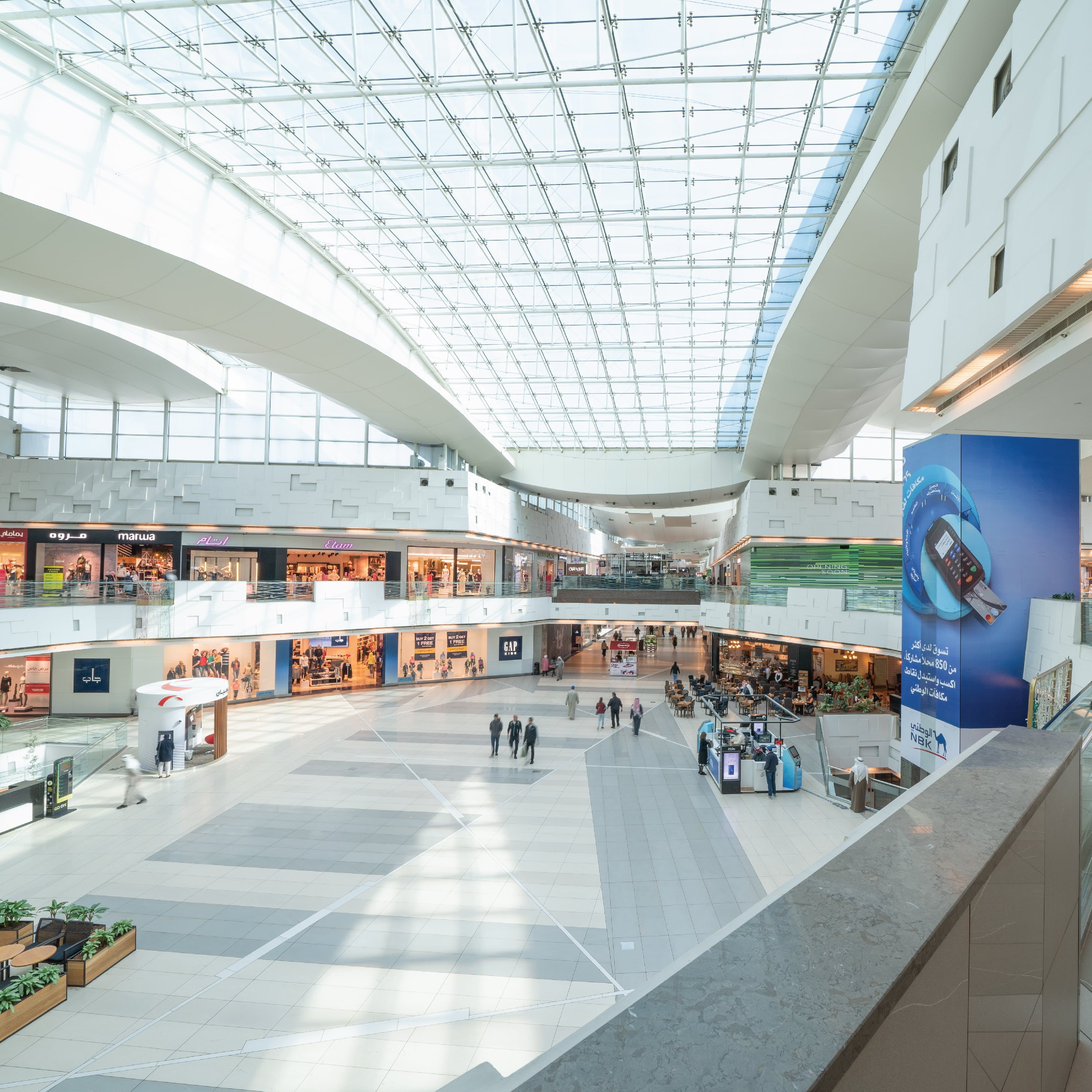
1st Avenue's Interior

1^{st} Avenue district covers a spacious area that includes over 200 stores, restaurants, and cafes and 11 Cinescape movie halls. It encompasses one of the two warehouse IKEA stores in Kuwait (the other being at

The Warehouse Mall). Many international stores will be found here too, some making their first debut in Kuwait exclusively in The Avenues. The largest H&M + H&M Home combo store in Kuwait (which was previously occupied by the first incarnation of Debenhams at The Avenues (prior to moving from Phase 1 to 4 before shuttering its Kuwaiti locations) is located here, in addition to the recently closed Pottery Barn Kids, the first incarnation of the also closed Pottery Barn store (before the Phase 3 location), and a flagship Zara store. Other prominent retailers include:

- The British toy store Hamleys
- The local bookstore and stationery retailer Jarir Bookstore
- The larger branch of the electronics store X-Cite (by Alghanim Electronics)
- The health and beauty retailer Vavavoom

1^{st} Avenue is also the first of The Avenues' districts and is considered the initial one too.

=== 2^{nd} Avenue ===
2nd Avenue's District Logo

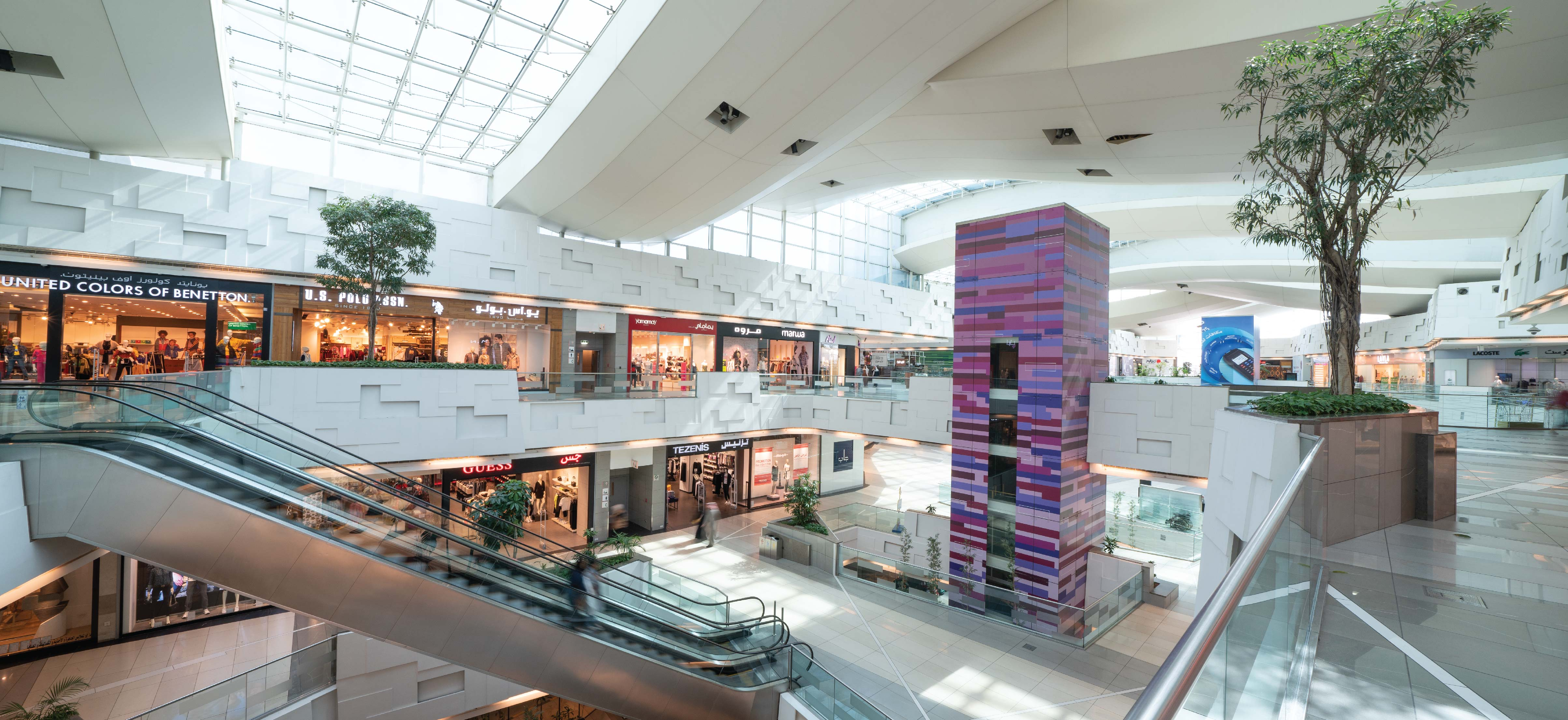
2nd Avenue's Interior

2^{nd} Avenue follows the same characteristic architectural language of 1^{st} Avenue except with a larger footprint. It features one of the two "Food Worlds" at The Avenues, as well as the first location of Ulta Beauty in Kuwait (formerly Dean & DeLuca). It also houses the largest of three Pinkberry frozen dessert branches inside the mall (opposite the former), Benihana, Fantasy World, HyperMax Supermarket (formerly Carrefour), and a large Marks & Spencer store (formerly Baroue/Baroue Frostland). The largest Next clothing store and entertainment center Magic Planet are here too.

Construction on 2^{nd} Avenue actually spanned 2 parts: namely "A" and "B":

The "A" segment of the district spans the footprint that begins at Next and terminates roughly at HyperMax, while the footprint from HyperMax up until the Lebanese restaurant Bebabel (formerly The Gaucho Grill) makes up the "B" segment.

=== The Mall ===
The Mall's District Logo

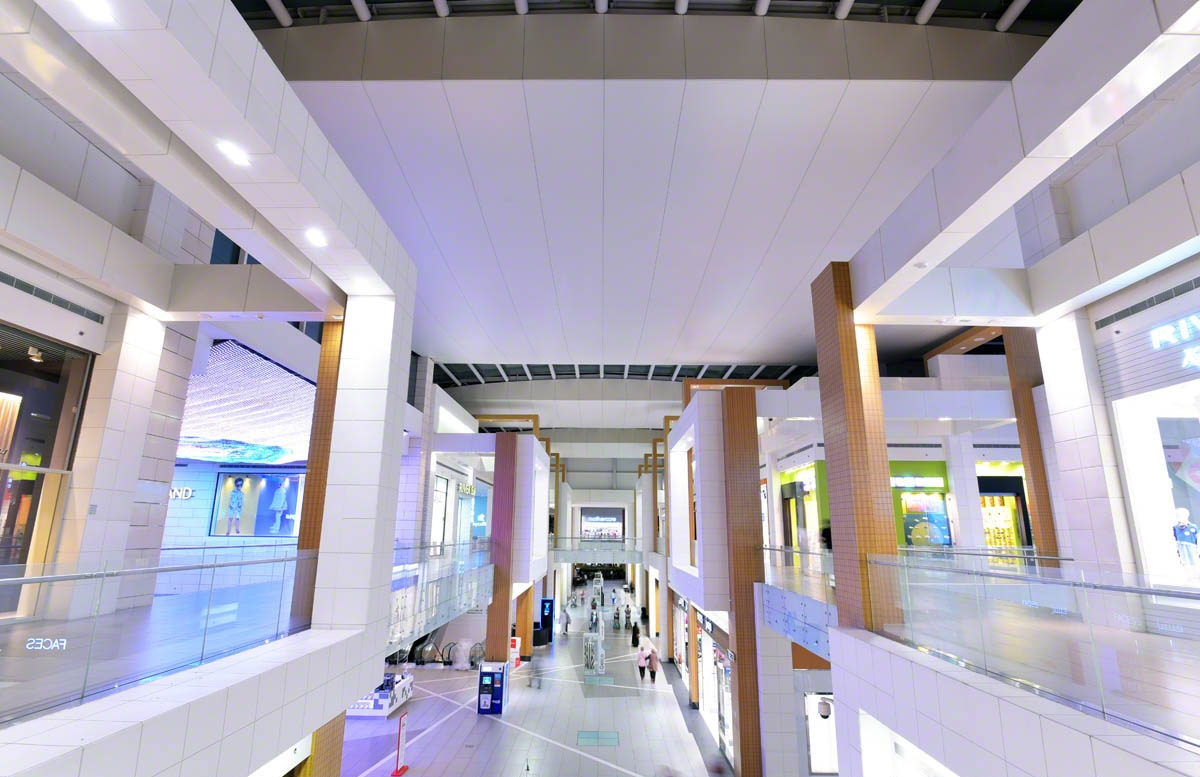
The Mall's Interior

The Mall is considered to be the spiritual successor to 1^{st} and 2^{nd} Avenue, featuring a modernized, newer architectural design that still continues the "classical" atmosphere of the former two.

Considered to be the first Phase III district that shoppers come in contact with from the left terminus of the complex, The Mall has several unique tenants:

- Two of three iterations of the Finnish SuperPark Kuwait (SPRPRK) at The Avenues Mall are located here, one being the original SuperPark and the other being SuperPark Arena. The former has a secondary side entrance that can be accessible from Entrance 16's mezzanine (opposite EscapeLand), while the latter was formerly the second Mothercare location in the complex.
- A Kuwait Airways (Kuwait's official airline passenger carrier) sale office and customer service center.
- QUEST Kuwait, another children's soft play arena that took over IHOP's former location. (IHOP was previously a brand owned by The Alshaya Group, before they dropped and transferred it to Kout Food Group, who opened their current location on 2^{nd} Avenue's first floor (in the Food World, between Applebee's and Magic Planet's upper entrance).
- A large American Eagle + Aerie combo store.
- The Mexican educational roleplay entertainment center KidZania.
- Kids-only branches of Next and Foot Locker, respectively.
- The audio product company Bang & Olufsen (B&O).
- The main branch of Ben's Cookies (with a small stand operating seasonally in front of the Grand Avenue entrance to Magic Planet's lower level).

The area also seasonally operates a miniature steam train, which children can ride on for a small fee under a driver's supervision around the district.

== See also ==
- The Avenues Bahrain
