= The Avenues, Bahrain =

The Avenues
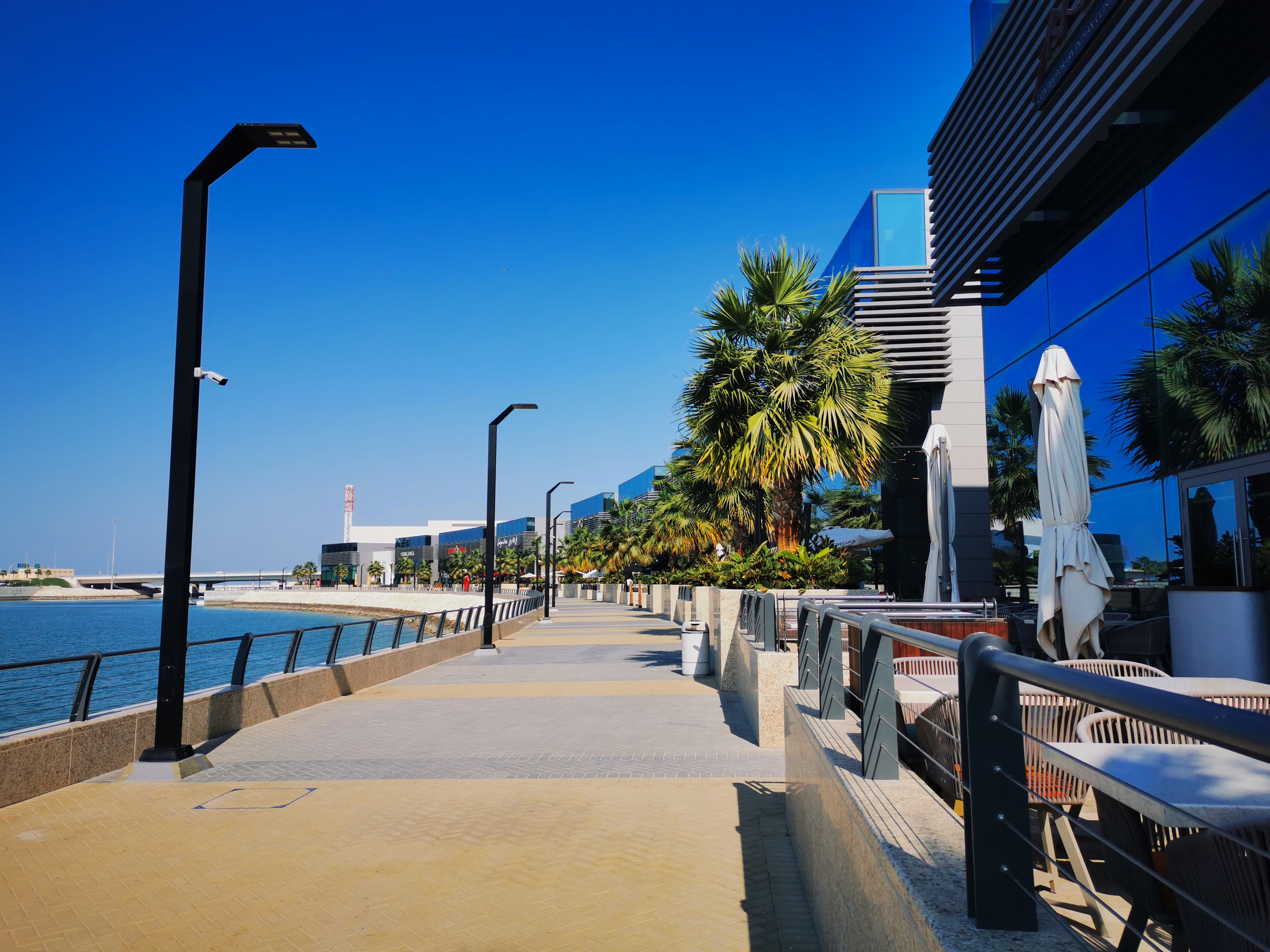
- View of the coastline side of the Avenues
- Location: Manama, Bahrain
- Coordinates: 26°14′43″N 50°35′7″E
- Opened: 29 October 2017; 9 years ago
- Developer: The Avenues Company W.L.L.
- Owner: Al Sorouh Management Company W.L.L.
- Floor area: 273,000 m^{2} (2,940,000 sq ft)
- Floors: 1

The Avenues is a waterfront shopping center situated along Bahrain Bay, in Manama, Bahrain. Developed by the King Faisal Corniche Development Company, the $186 million (BD90 million) development spans a total area of 273,000 m^{2} (2,940,000 sq ft) along a 1.5 km (0.93 mi) seafront corniche. Construction began in September 2014 and the project was initially slated to be completed by February 2017. It was officially opened to the public on 29 October 2017.

== Development ==
The project is the creation of Al Sorouh Management Company W.L.L., a venture by Bahraini investors in partnership with the retailer M. H. Alshaya and the Kuwait-based Mabanee Corporation, who are the owners of The Avenues Kuwait, one of the largest malls in the world. Funding for the project was provided by the National Bank of Kuwait. Worksite construction was contracted to the Nass Corporation B.S.C. The MEP contractor is Airmech W.L.L. The lead project consultant is the Mohamed Salahuddin Consulting Engineering Bureau and the design consultancy awarded to Gensler.

The foundation stone on the development was laid by the deputy Prime Minister of Bahrain Shaikh Khalid bin Abdullah Al Khalifa in September 2014. In January 2016, the Mabanee corporation announced delays to the project, citing design changes.

== Facilities ==
Centred around a family-friendly environment and hoping to boost family tourism to Bahrain, the 273,000 m^{2} (2,940,000 sq ft) development will feature numerous playgrounds, outdoor jogging tracks and a gym, waterfront restaurants, cafes, arcades, a souq and cinemas. A total of 75,000 m^{2} (810,000 sq ft) of land is allocated to gardens, a 40m wide promenade, and public parks. The total leasable area is 38,000 m^{2} (410,000 sq ft), accounting for 15% of the total development area. Planned parking facilities can accommodate up to 1,400 vehicles.

Owing to the site's close proximity with iconic landmarks, the developers opted to limit the vertical height of the mall to one floor. It has been a popular location in recent times

The mall also features a water taxi service that transports passengers to and from the development, from various jetties around Bahrain.

== See also ==
- Bahrain City Centre
- List of shopping malls in Bahrain
- Visual tour of The Avenues Bahrain
