= Tree of Life (Bahrain) =

Tree in Bahrain

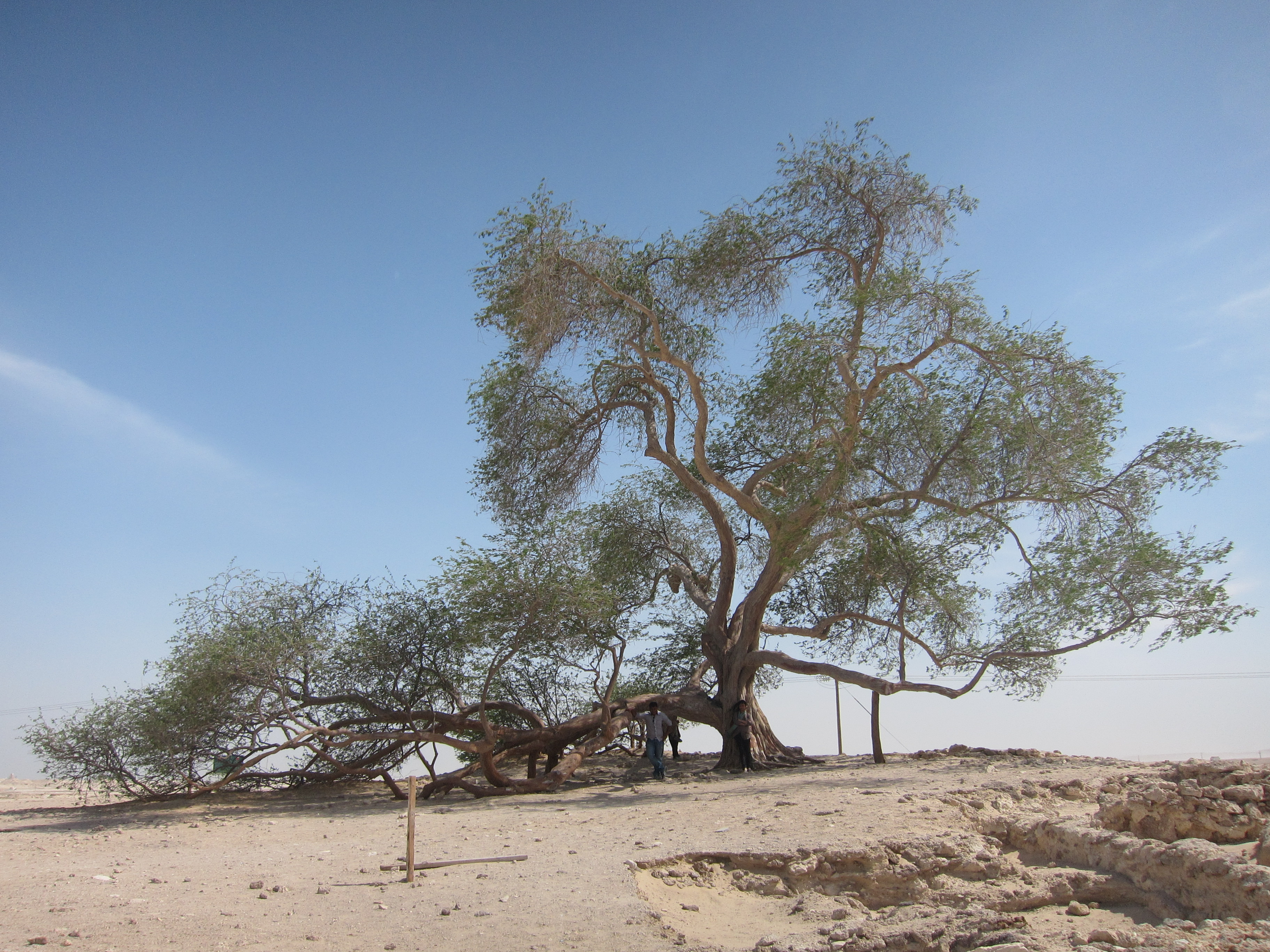
- In 2013
- Interactive map of Tree of Life
- Native name: Shajarat-al-Hayat (Arabic)
- Species: Prosopis juliflora
- Coordinates: 25°59′38.66″N 50°34′59.65″E

The Tree of Life (Shajarat-al-Hayat) in Bahrain is a 9.75-metre (32.0 ft) high Prosopis juliflora tree that is over 400 years old. It is on a hill in a barren area of the Arabian Desert, approximately 6 kilometers (3.7 mi) from Jebel Dukhan, the highest point in Bahrain, and 40 kilometers (25 mi) from Manama.

The tree is abundantly covered in green leaves. Due to its age and the fact that it is the only major tree growing in the area, the tree is a local tourist attraction and is visited by approximately 65,000 people every year. The yellow resin is used to make candles, aromatics and gum; the beans are processed into meal, jam, and wine.

It is not certain how the tree survives. Bahrain has little to no rain throughout the year. Its roots are 50 meters (160 ft) deep, which may be enough to reach the water. Others believe the tree has learned to extract moisture from grains of sand. Some claim that the tree is standing in what was once the Garden of Eden in biblical narratives, and so has a more mystical source of water.

In 2009, the tree was nominated to the New 7 Wonders of Nature list, but it did not finish on the list.

In October 2010, archaeologists unearthed 500-year-old pottery and other artefacts in the vicinity of the tree. A soil and dendrochronology analysis conducted in the 1990s concluded that the tree was an acacia planted in 1582.

The tree was mentioned in the 1991 film L.A. Story, where Steve Martin calls it one of the most mystical places on Earth.

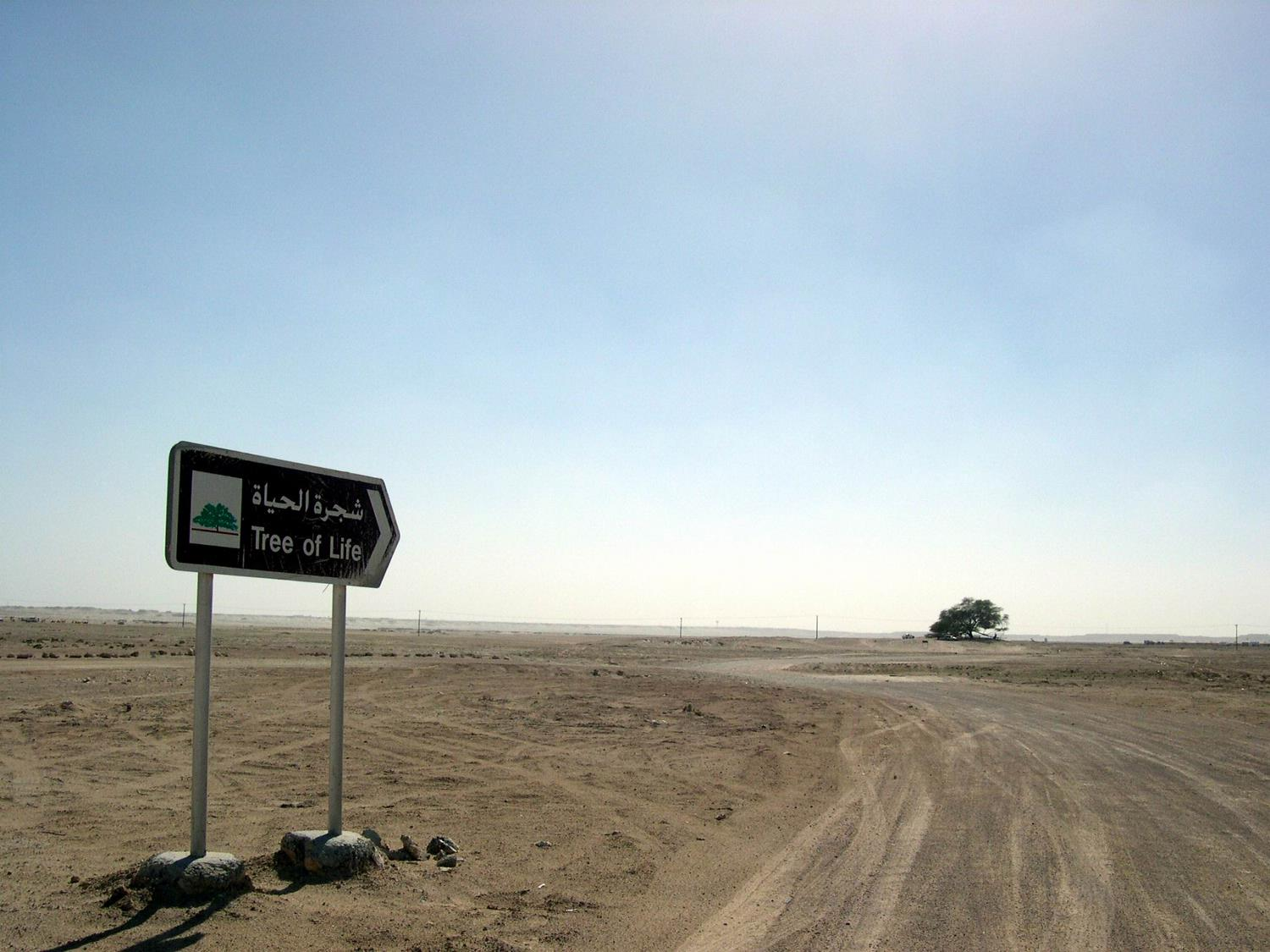
Dirt road leading to the Tree of Life

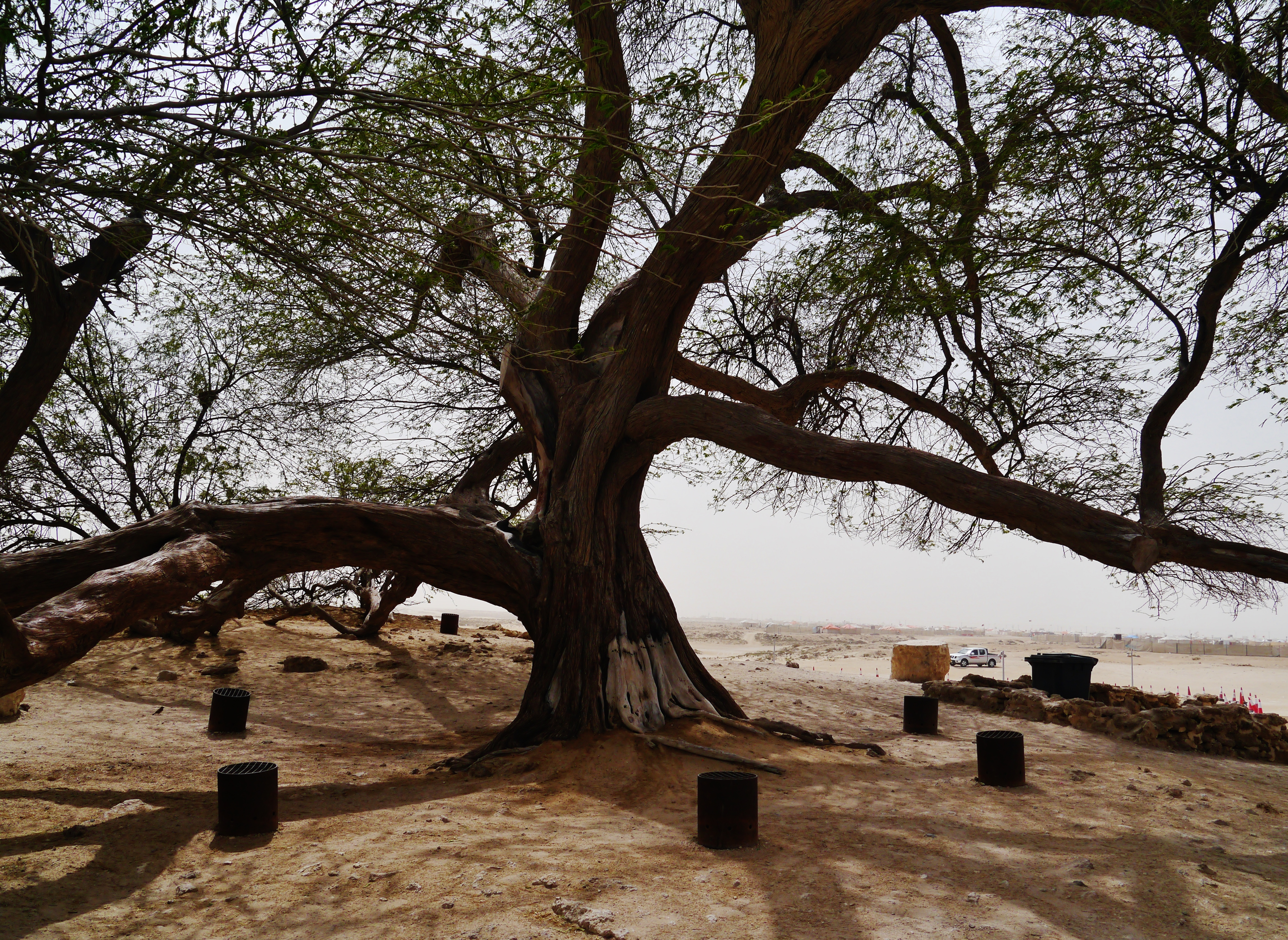
Close up

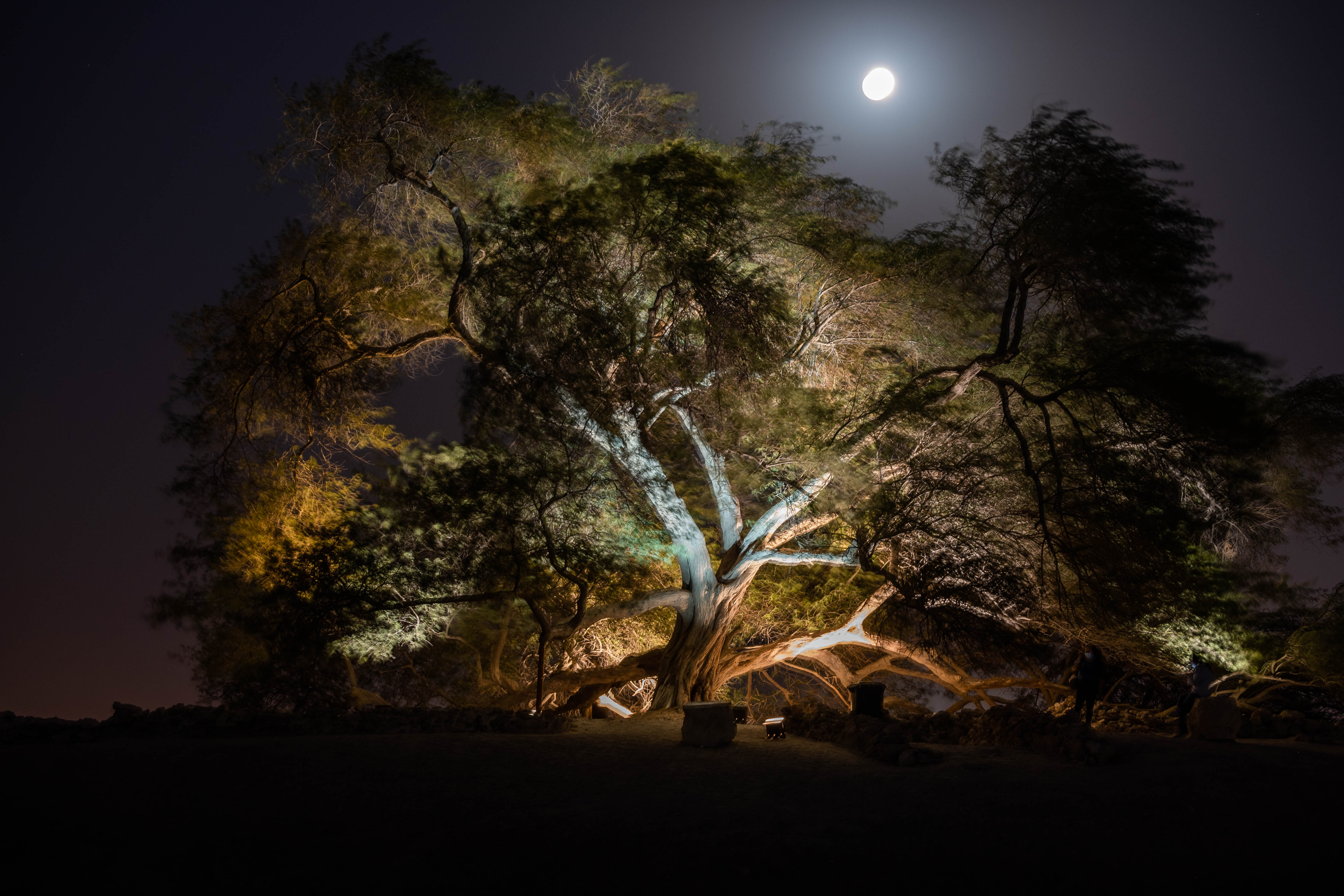
Tree of life at night

== See also ==
- List of individual trees
