= Al Fateh Grand Mosque =

Mosque in Manama, Bahrain

Al-Fateh Grand Mosque
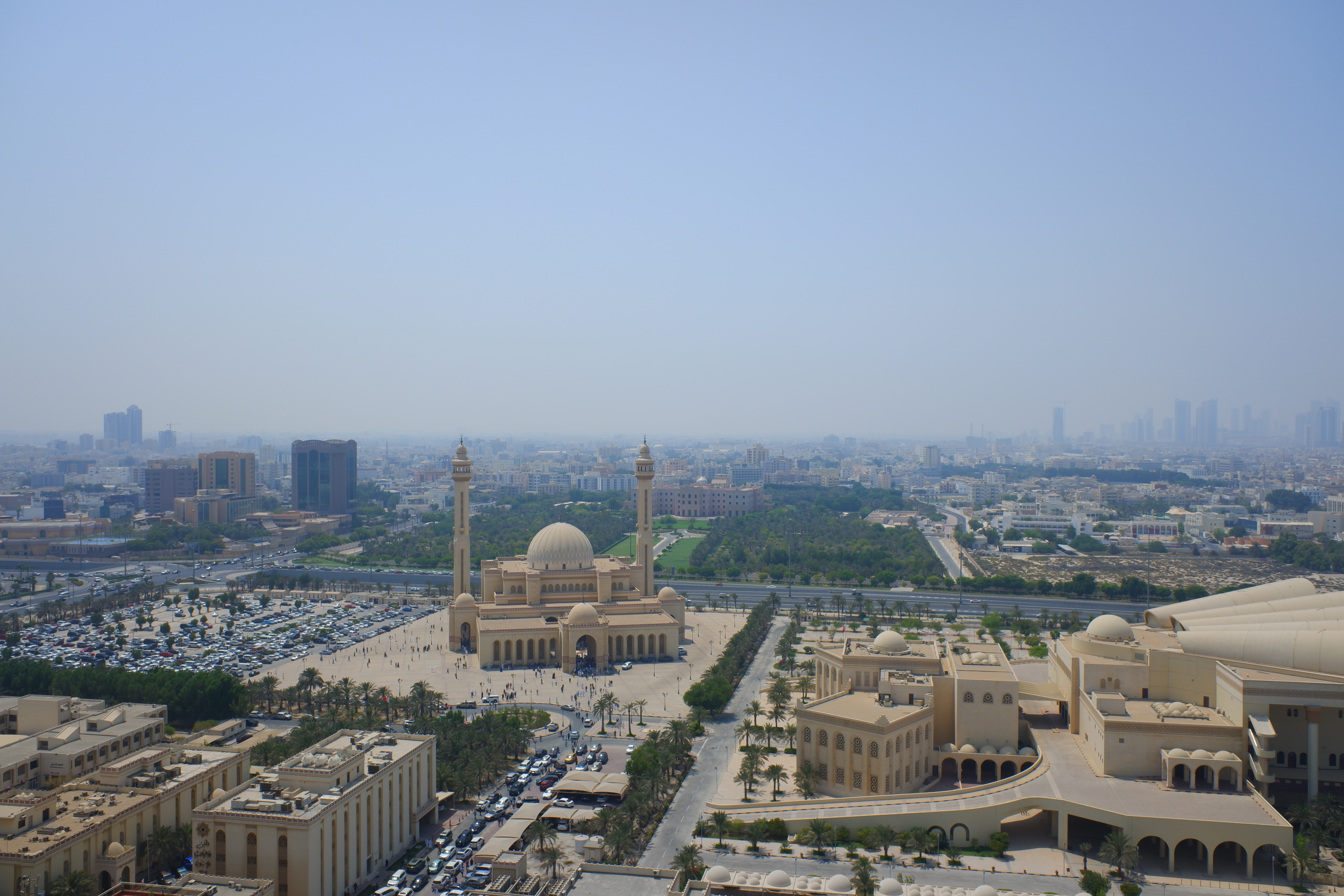

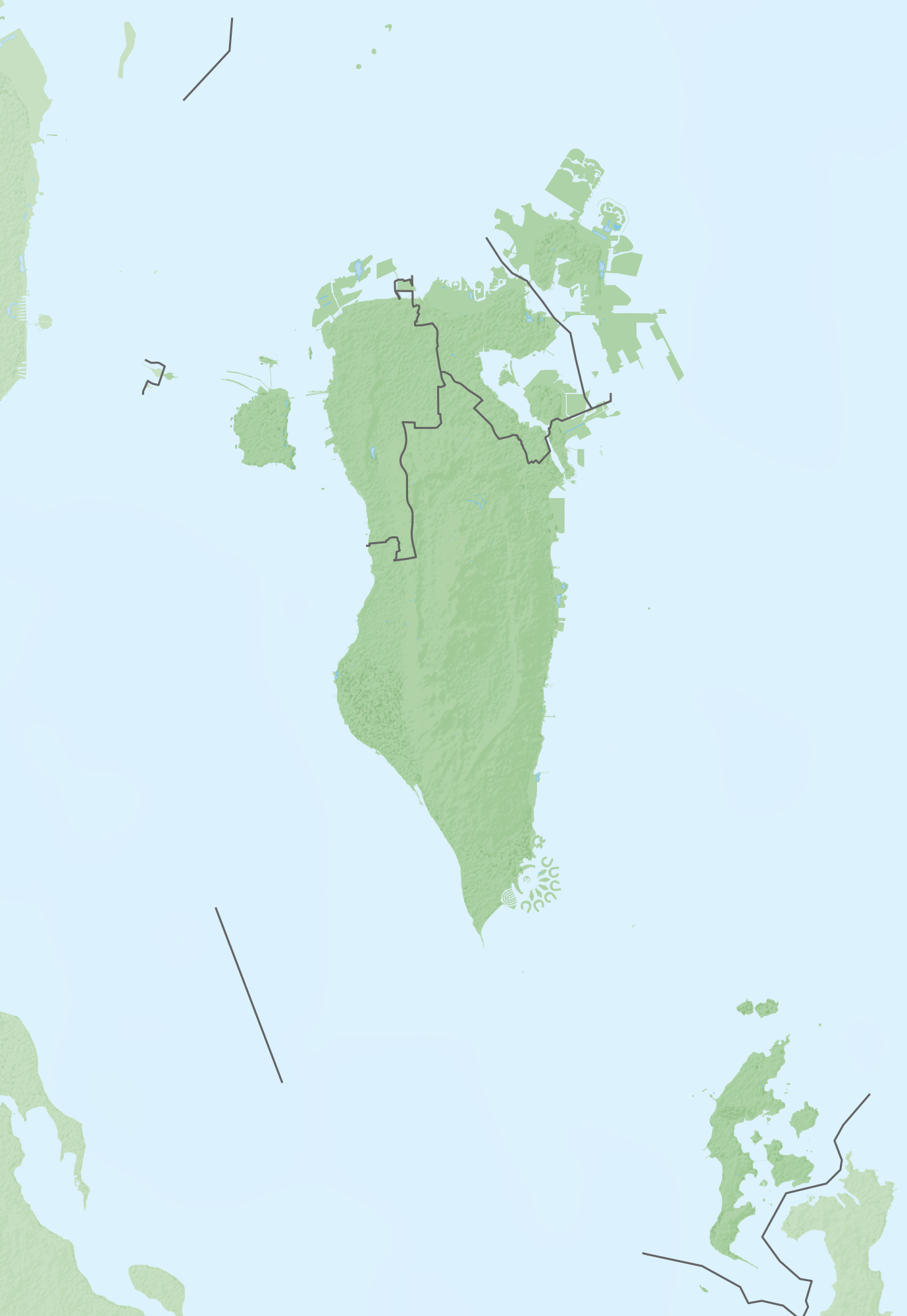
- Location of the mosque in Bahrain

Religion
- Affiliation: Sunni Islam
- Leadership: Sheikh Ali Salah Omar (imam); Sheikh Adnan bin Abdullah al Qattan (khateeb)
- Status: Active

Location
- Location: Manama
- Country: Bahrain
- Interactive map of Al-Fateh Grand Mosque
- Coordinates: 26°13′08″N 50°35′53″E

Architecture
- Type: mosque
- Style: Islamic
- Completed: 1988

Specifications
- Direction of façade: Southeast
- Capacity: 7,000 worshippers
- Length: 100 m (330 ft)
- Width: 75 m (246 ft)
- Interior area: 6,500 m^{2} (70,000 sq ft)
- Dome: Four
- Dome dia. (outer): 24 m (79 ft)
- Minaret: Two
- Materials: Concrete; fiberglass; marble; teak

The Al-Fateh Mosque, also known as the Al-Fateh Islamic Center and as the Al Fateh Grand Mosque, (Arabic: مسجد الفاتح, romanized: Masjid al-Fatih) is a large mosque, located in Manama, Bahrain. Encompassing 6,500 square metres (70,000 sq ft), with the capacity to accommodate over 7,000 worshippers at a time, it was one of the largest mosques in the world. The mosque was built by the late Sheikh Isa Bin Salman Al Khalifa in 1987 and was named in honour of Ahmed Al Fateh. In 2006, Al-Fateh became the site of the National Library of Bahrain.

== Overview ==
The mosque was the largest place of worship in Bahrain. It is located next to the Al Fateh Highway in Juffair, which is a suburban neighborhood of Manama. The huge 54-tonne (60-short-ton) dome, built on top of the Al-Fateh Mosque, was constructed entirely of fibreglass and was the world's largest fiberglass dome. The flooring is Italian marble and the chandelier was from Austria. The doors were made of teak from India. There is Kufic calligraphy throughout the mosque.

== Library ==
The library of Ahmed Al-Fateh Islamic Center has approximately 7,000 books, some as old as 100 years or more. These include copies of the books of the teachings of Muhammad or what is referred to as the books of Hadith, the Global Arabic Encyclopedia, the Encyclopedia of Islamic Jurisprudence, Al-Azhar journals which have been printed more than a hundred years ago, as well as numerous periodicals and magazines.

== Tourism ==
Besides being a place of worship, the mosque is one of the premier tourist attractions in Bahrain. It is open from 9am to 4pm and tours are conducted in a variety of languages including English, French, Filipino, Russian and many other languages, special arrangements are encouraged for smooth sailing. The mosque is open to visitors and tourists on all days except Fridays.

== Gallery ==
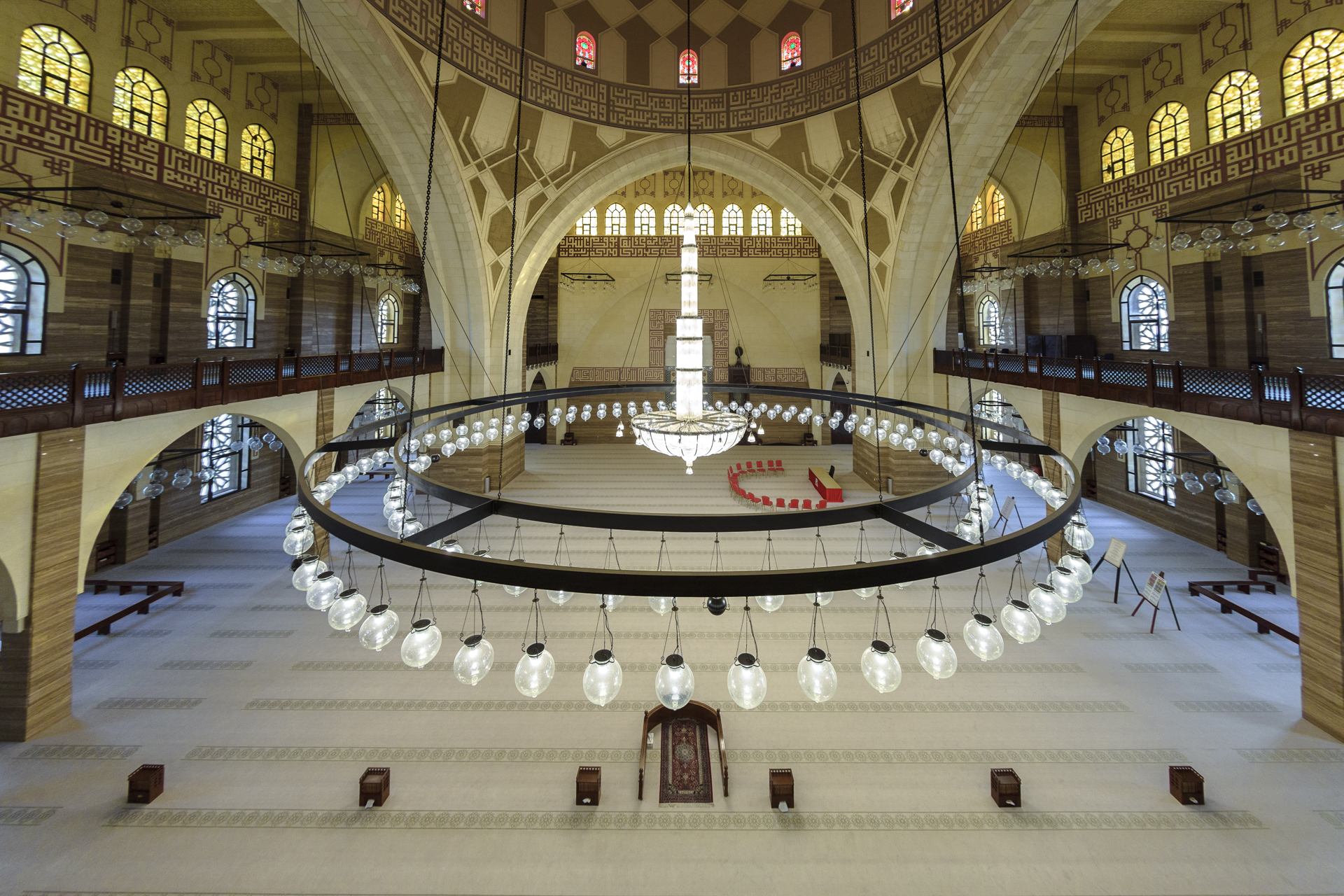
Main Prayer Hall from a decent height

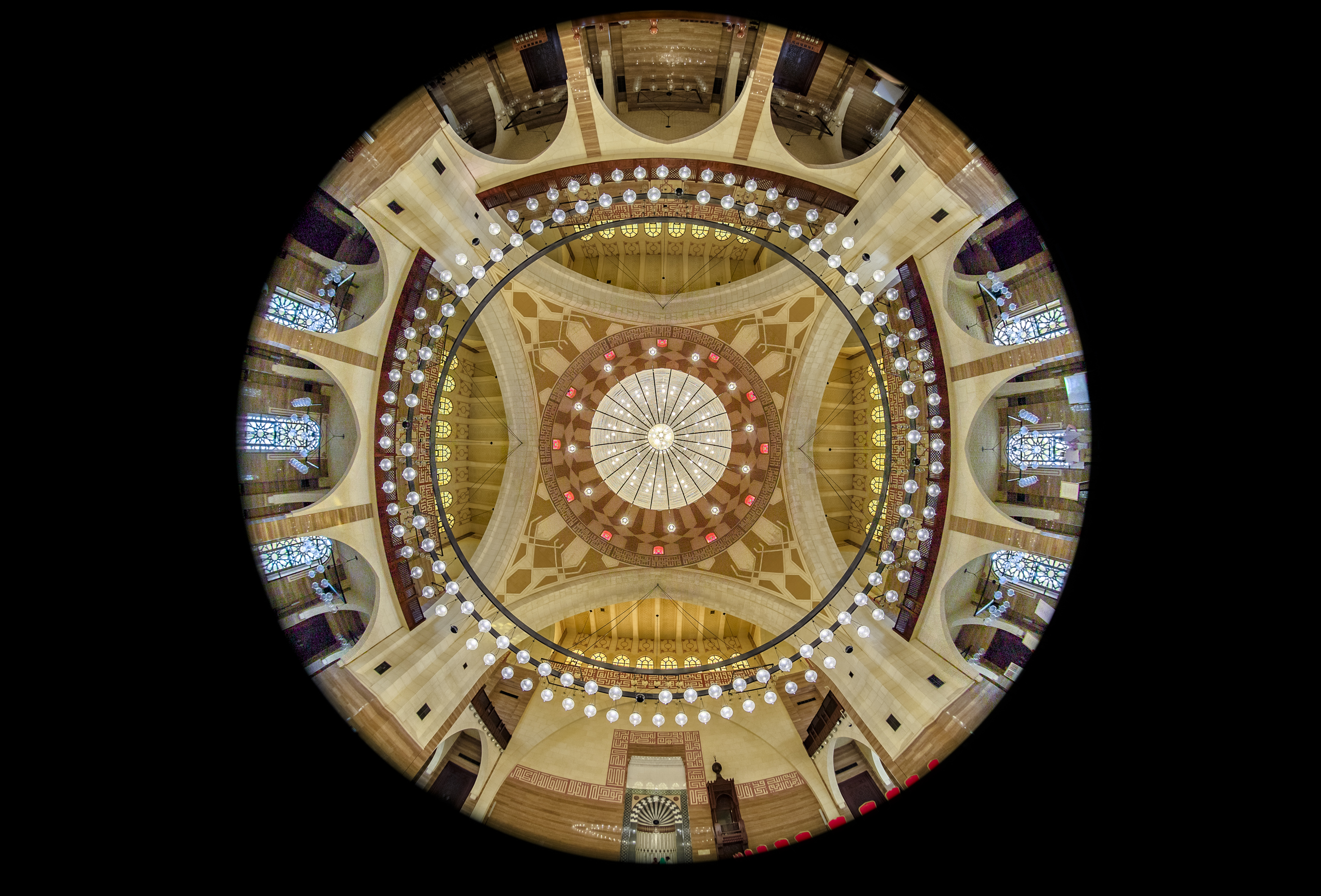
Main Prayer Hall

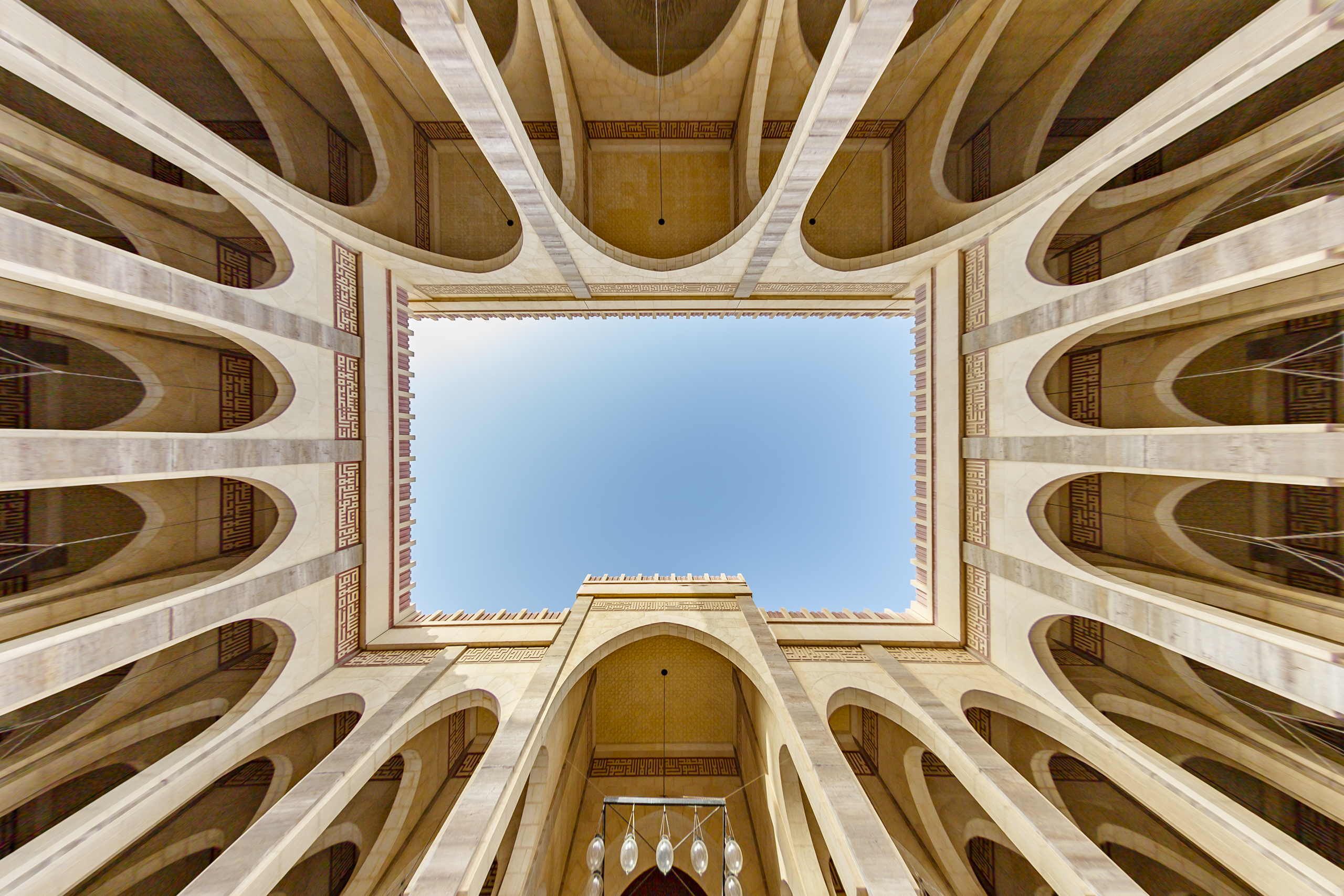
Entering thru Main Gate, Open Area of the mosque

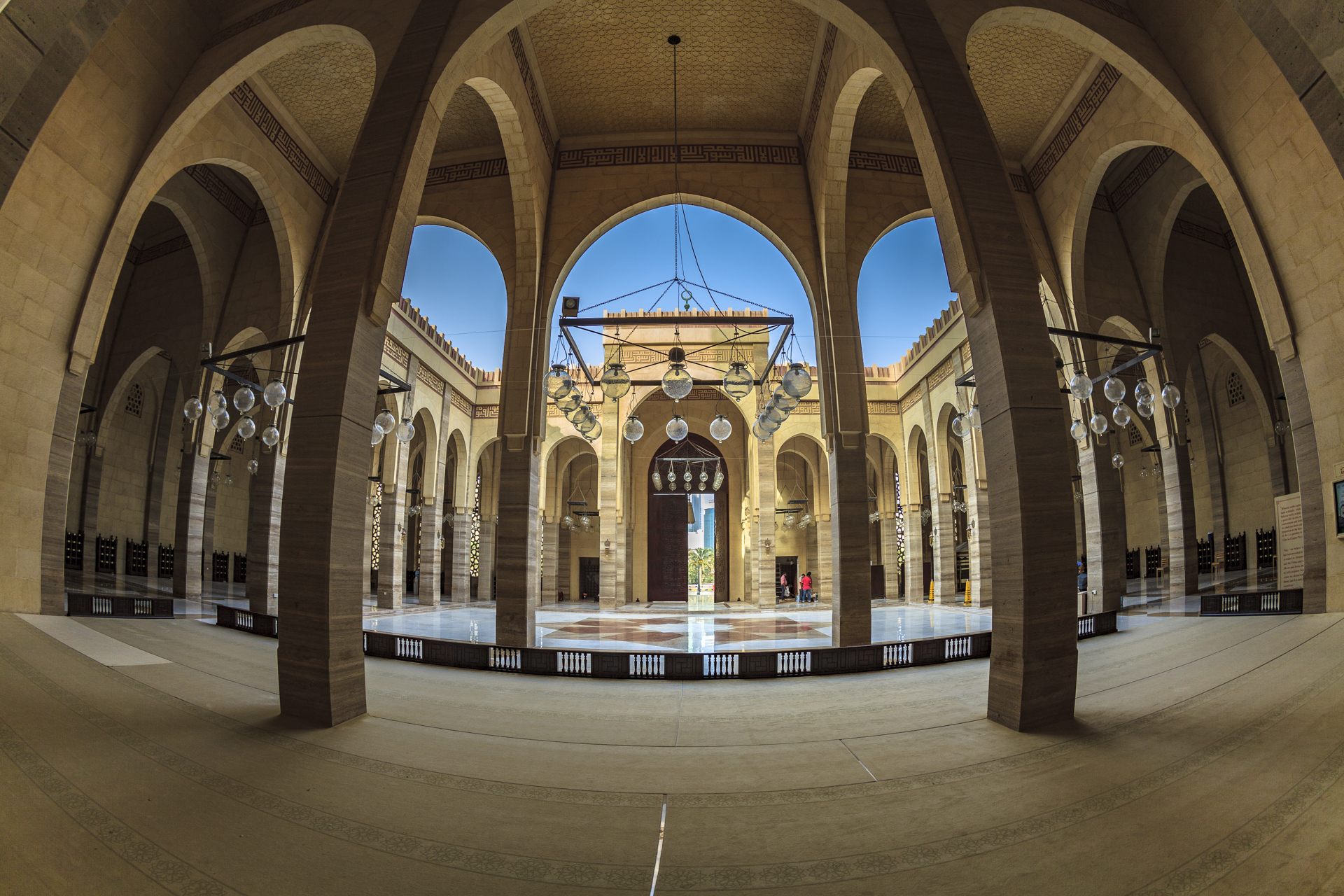
Main Gate to enter the Mosque

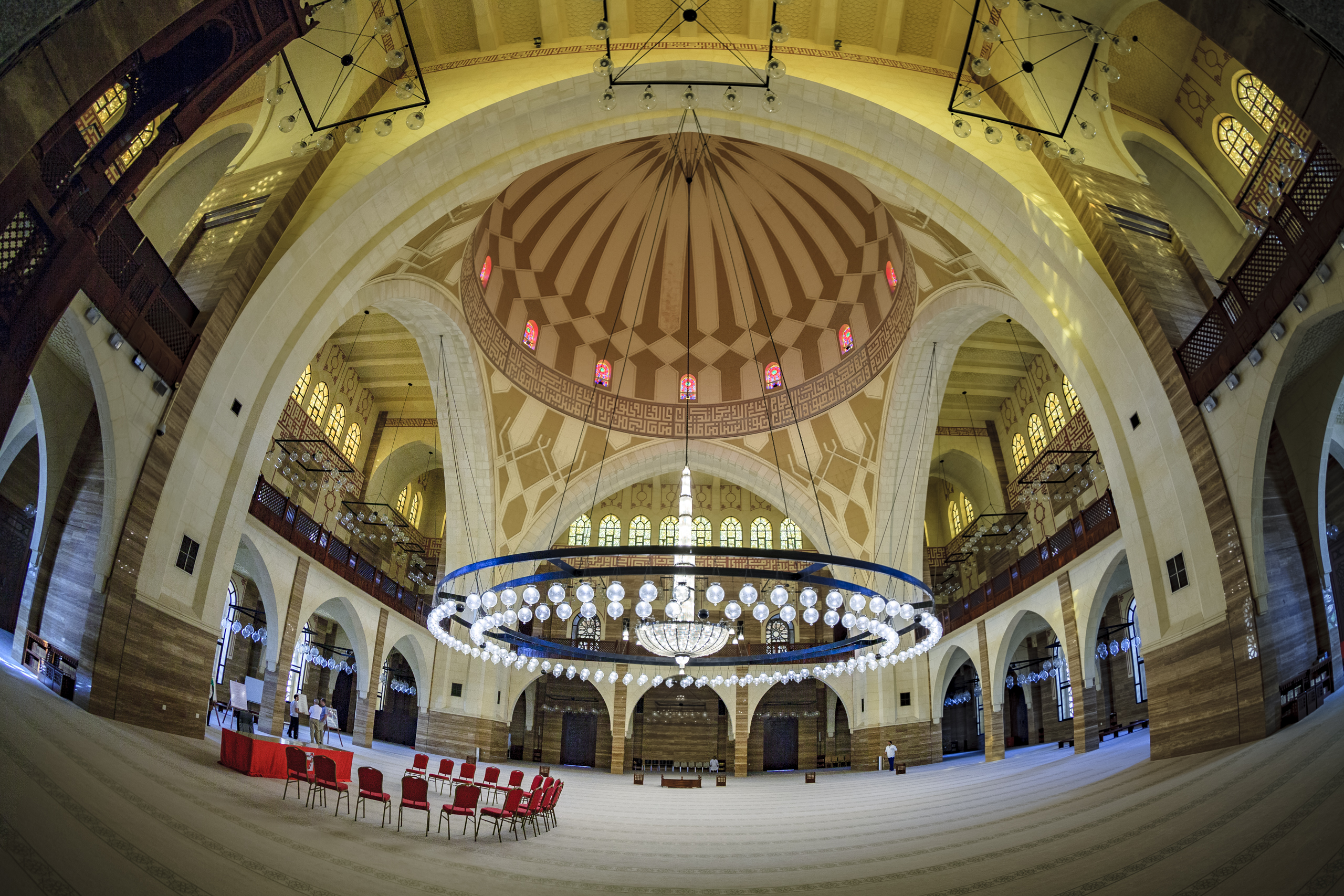
Main Prayer Hall standing at the Mehrab Side

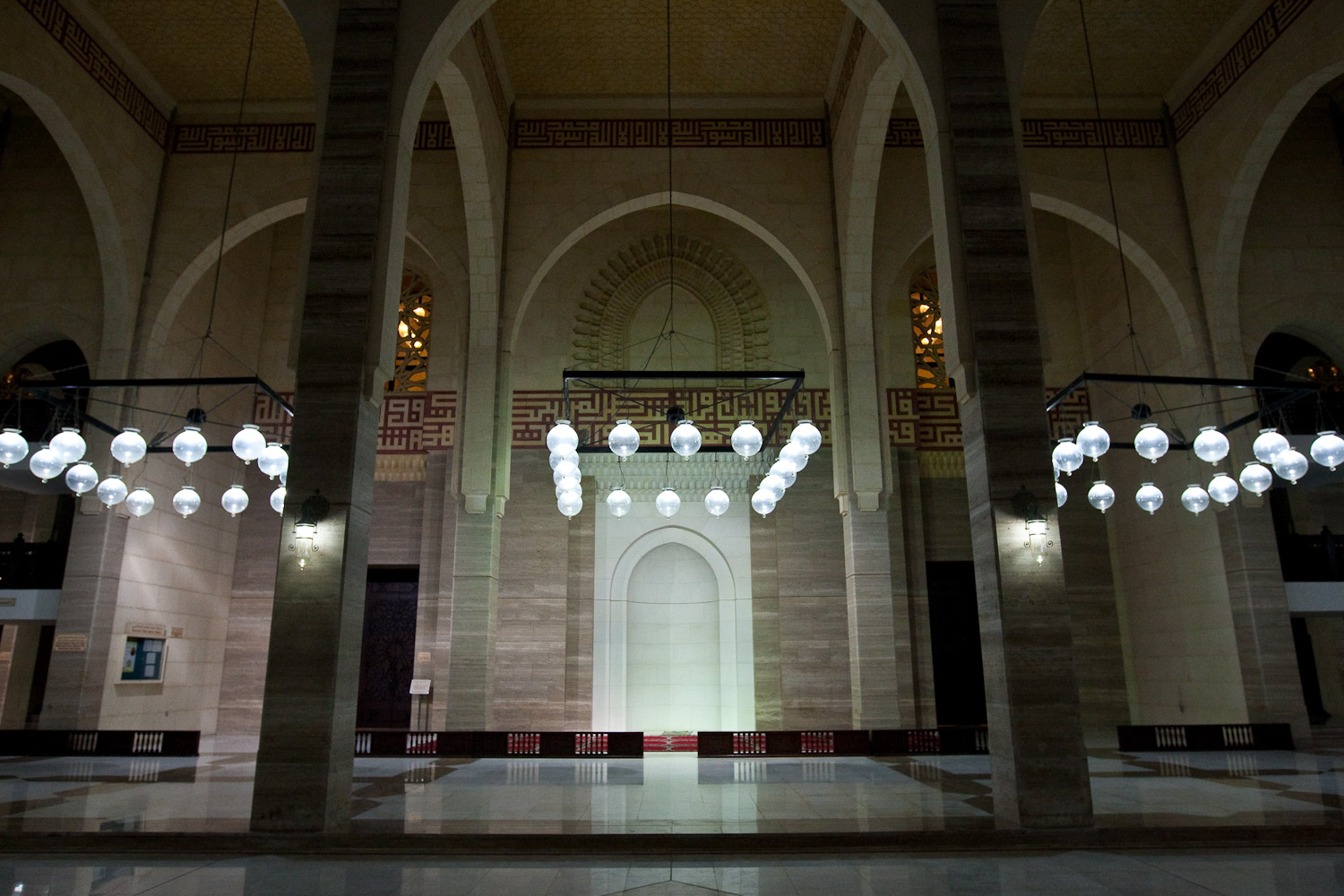
Interior of the mosque

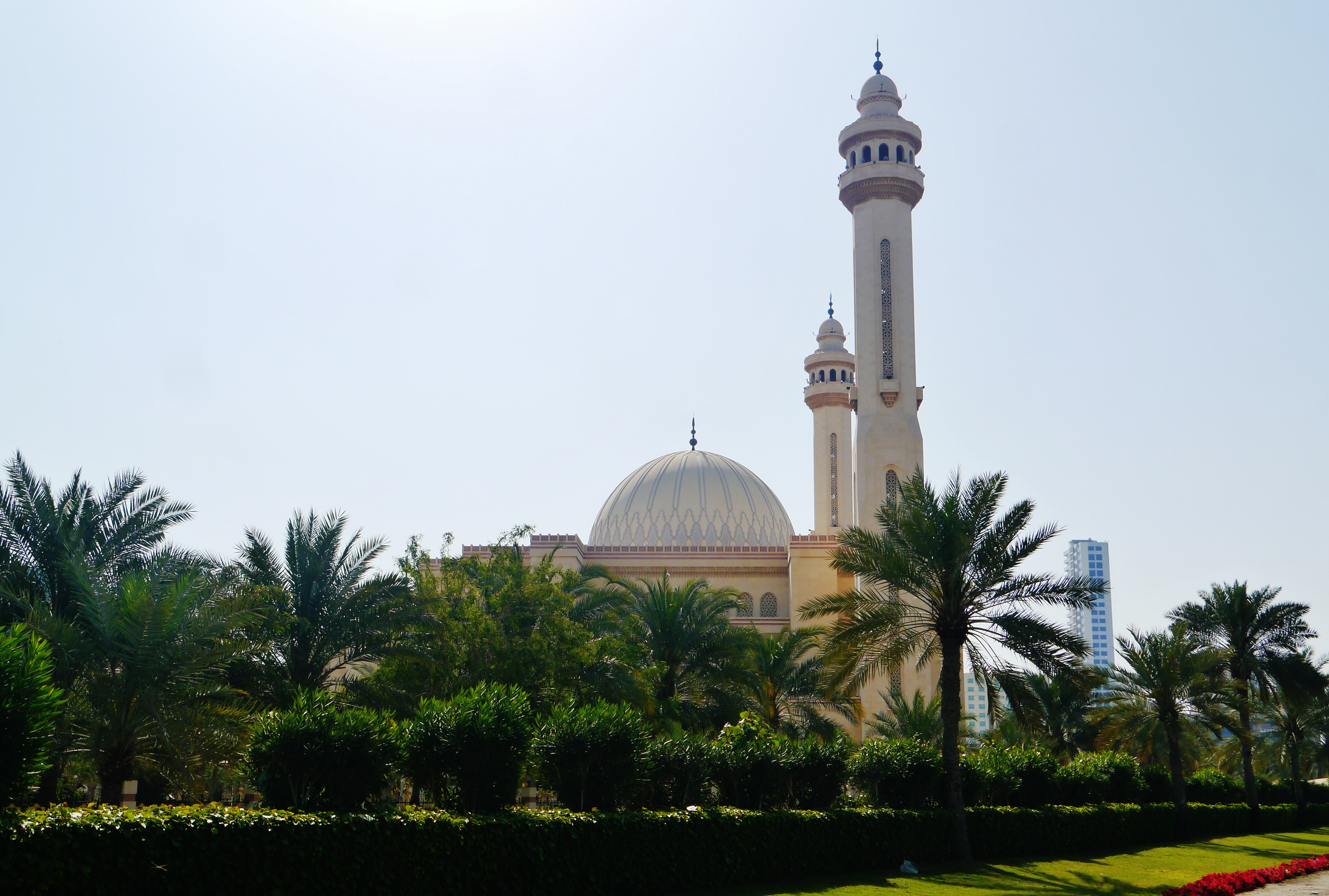
View from northern exterior

== See also ==
- Islam in Bahrain
- List of mosques in Bahrain
