= Dana Mall =

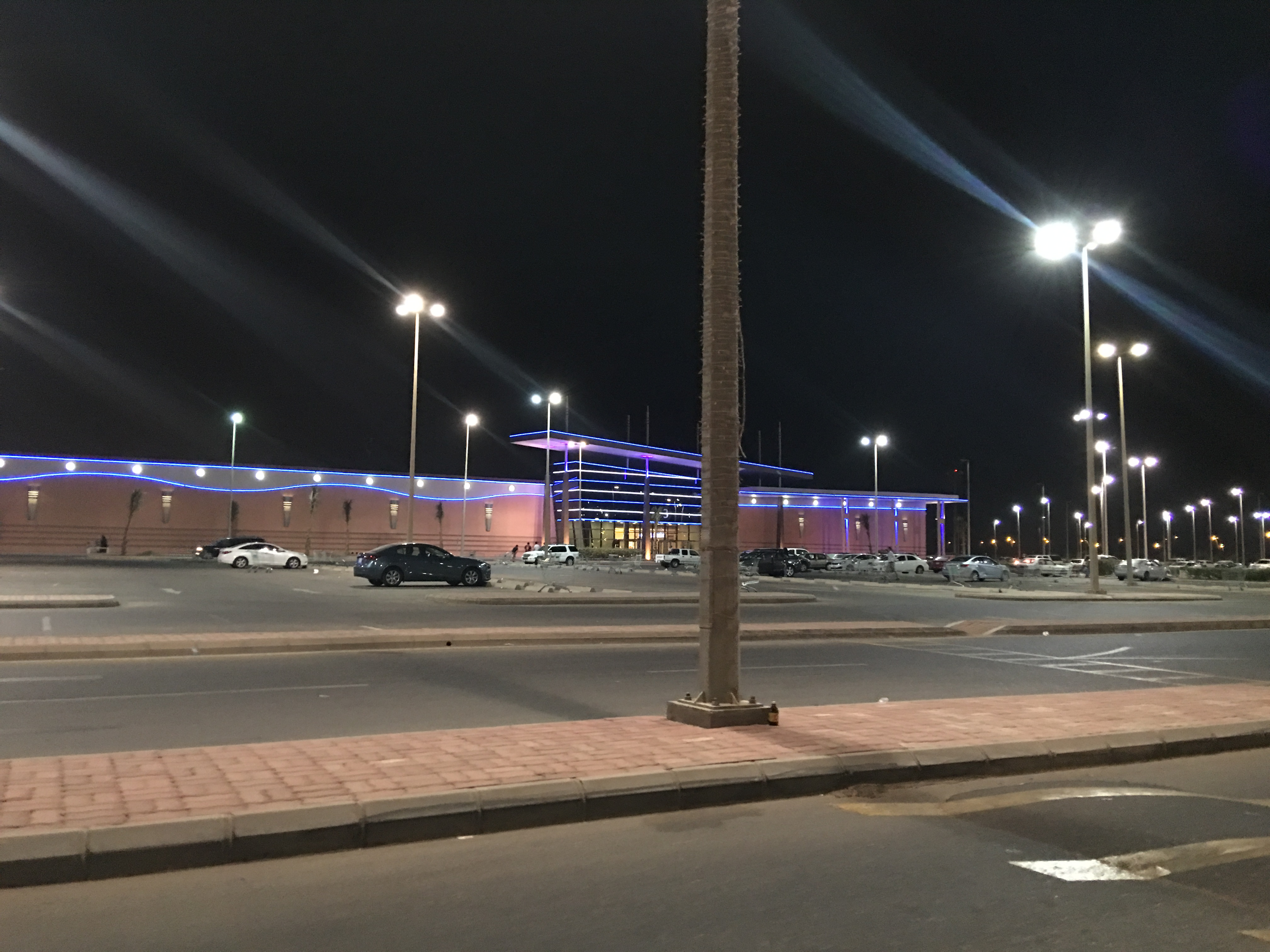
- Night-time view of the mall from the road
- Location: Seef District, Manama, Bahrain
- Coordinates: 26.23015°N 50.55261°E
- Address: Shaikh Khalifa Bin Salman Highway, Sanabis, Manama, Bahrain
- Opened: 2002
- Floor area: 390,000 square feet (total area: 700,000 square feet)
- Parking: 1,800 cars
- Website: www.danamall.net

Dana Mall is an early shopping mall in the Seef District of Manama, the capital city of Bahrain. The exterior of the mall is in Jordanian stone and the interior includes domes and stained glass ceilings.

Dana Mall is one of the first established in Bahrain, opened in 2002. It includes a food court, Lulu Hypermarket as the anchor store (the first LuLu store in Bahrain, opened in 2007, expanded in 2020), and restaurants. Dana Mall is the location of the LuLu Group head office in Bahrain.

The complex also includes the EPIX Cinemas WLL, with 10 screens. The cinema has stadium seating with 1,100 seats and is considered the best in Bahrain.

The mall has been the location of ceremonies and events, for example, for World Sight Day. In 2021, the mall was the location of a Brave Combat Federation mixed martial arts workout and conference. Also in 2021, Jameel Al Humaidan, the Bahrain Minister of Labour and Social Development, participated in a ceremony at the mall.

== See also ==
- List of shopping malls in Bahrain
