= The Bahrain Mall =

- Location: Sanabis, Manama, Bahrain
- Coordinates: 26°13′45.43″N 50°32′14.75″E
- Manager: Tamam Adel
- Num. of stores: 120
- Floor area: 70,000 m^{2} (750,000 sq ft)
- Floors: 2
- Website: www.thebahrainmall.com

The Bahrain Mall is a multistorey shopping mall situated in Sanabis, Manama city of the Kingdom of Bahrain. The mall features 1,600 parking spaces. The complex covers 70,000 square metres and attracts about 480,000 visitors per month. Now Has Been Takeover & Managed By Majid Al Futtaim Group
