= Juffair =

Neighborhood of Manama, Bahrain

Juffair الجفير
- Neighborhood
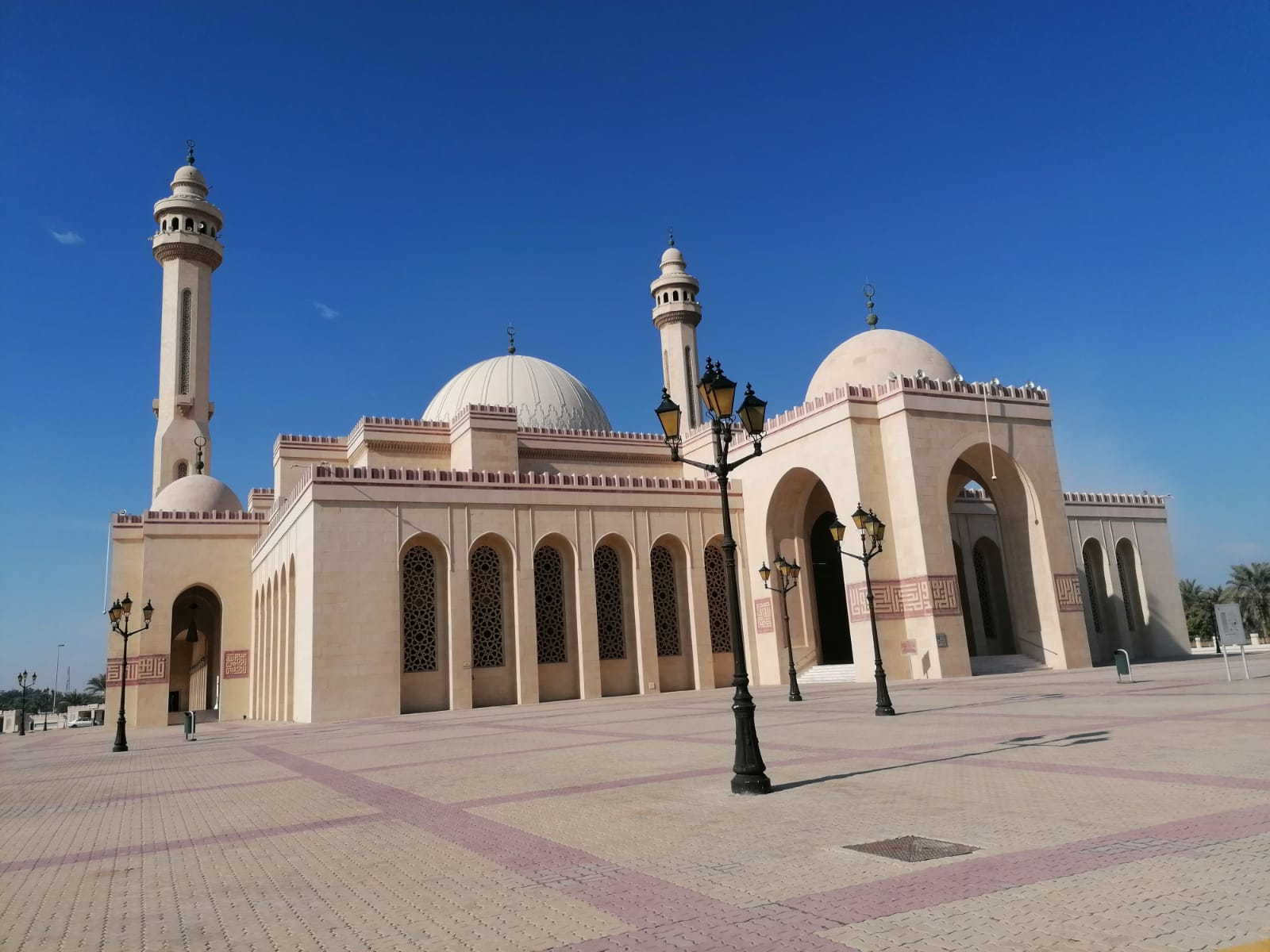
- Juffair skyline Al Fateh Grand Mosque

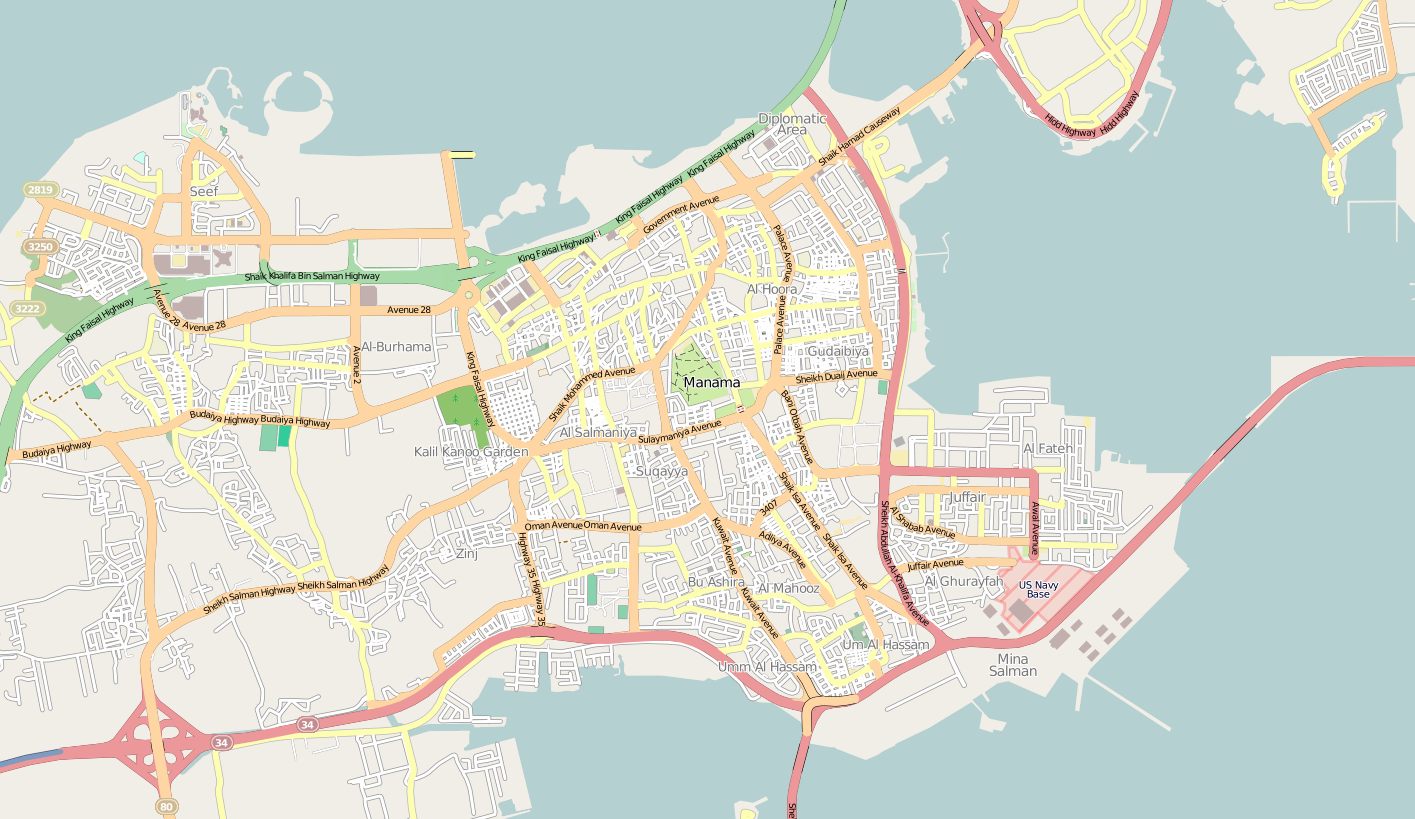
- Location in Manama
- Coordinates: 26°12′40″N 50°36′4″E
- Country: Bahrain
- Governorate: Capital Governorate
- City: Manama

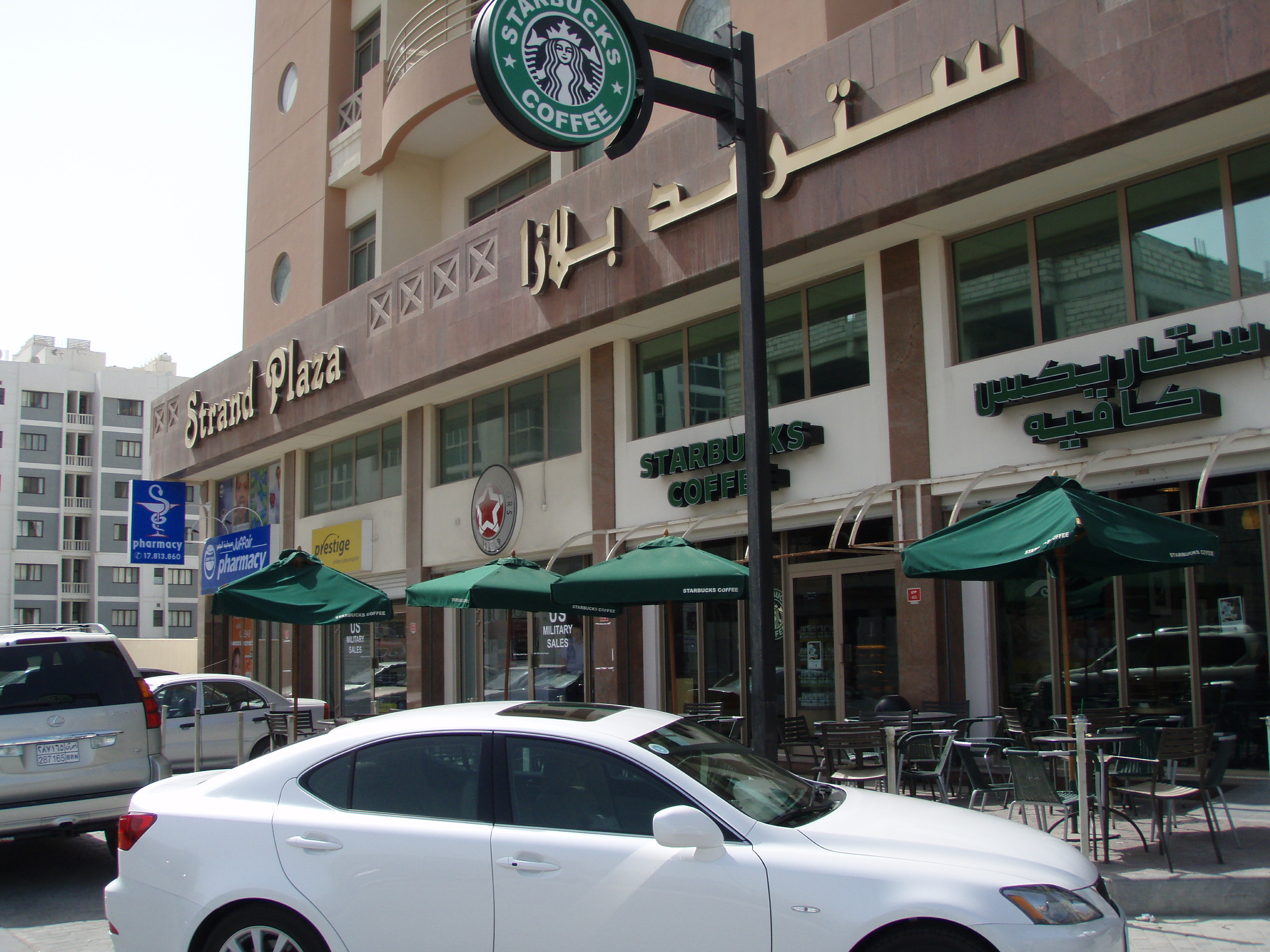
Starbucks in Juffair's Shabab Avenue

Juffair (Arabic: الجفير) is a district situated south of central Manama, Bahrain. Originally a village separate from Manama, it has since been absorbed by the suburban expansion of Manama in the 20th century, and presently includes large parts of land reclaimed from the sea. It is home to many hotels, restaurants, flats, and villas. It is regarded as one of Bahrain's main nightlife hotspots as it is also home to numerous nightclubs and bars.

It is also the site of Bahrain's largest mosque, Al Fateh Grand Mosque, which houses the National Library.

== History ==
In 1908, John Gordon Lorimer's Gazetteer of the Persian Gulf described Juffair as a village located on the northern tip of the cape of Juffair. It boasted 80 reed huts occupied by Baharna, cultivators and fishermen. The village was home to 15 pearling vessels at the time. A large clump of 900 date palms existed to the southwestern portion of the village alongside lucerne fields. A census of livestock showed 2 horses, 7 donkeys, and 4 cattle at the time.

A British naval installation known as HMS Jufair was established near the old Juffair village on April 13, 1935, in the area where ASU-SWA is located today. In 1950, the United States Navy leased office space aboard HMS JUFFAIR from the British. In 1971, after their treaty expired, the British left Bahrain, granting the island total independence. The United States, through agreement with the Bahraini government, took over part of HMS JUFFAIR, renaming it Administrative Support Unit Bahrain, subsequently Naval Support Activity Bahrain. Many Westerners live in Juffair.

== Amenities ==
The offices of the Ministry of Islamic Affairs, Central Informatics Organization, Bahrain Society of Engineers, and the Bahrain Tribune newspaper are all located in Juffair. The Bahrain School and Modern Knowledge School are both also located in Juffair.

There is a new commercial road in Juffair (Shabab Avenue) that houses many restaurants and retail outlets, especially large North American chains, giving around 300 metres of the southern part of the road the nickname "American Alley". Near the entrance of Juffair, there is a building called Murjan Shopping Center that has a large supermarket, a restaurant, post office, and coffee shops.

The American Naval Support Center is located in Juffair.

== See also ==
- Juffair Mall
- List of tourist attractions in Bahrain
- Culture of Bahrain
