= Sanabis =

Village in Manama, Bahrain

Coordinates: 26°14′N 50°33′E

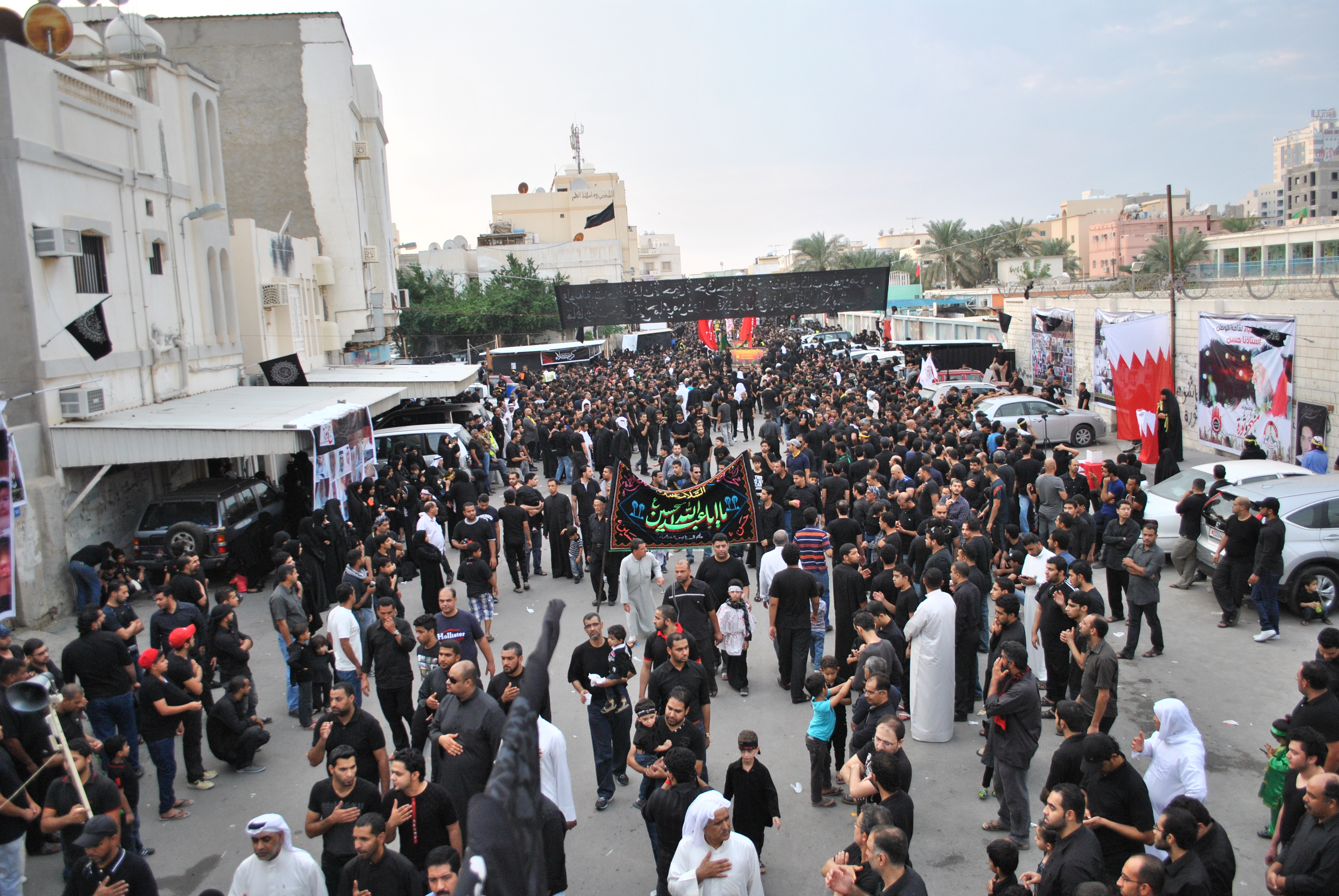
Procession in Sanabis, on the Day of Ashura

Sanabis (Arabic: سنابس Sanābis) is a village located in the Kingdom of Bahrain, in the suburbs of the capital city, Manama. It has an estimated current population of 6564, with a land area of roughly 1.2 km² and a population density approximately 5470/km²

== Etymology ==
The definition of the word Sanabis is disputed, with the most popular view being that members of the Sunbus tribe which traces its origins to the Qahtanite Tayy tribe migrated from Khobar to Qatif and Bahrain and the areas that they settled in were named Sinbas after the tribe's name but which later became known as Sanabis.

== History ==
In J. G. Lorimer's Gazetteer of the Persian Gulf (1908), Sanabis is said to be inhabited by 1500 Baharna who primarily engage in boat-building, pearling and fishing. According to his report, the village had a "prettily situated" mosque located in the centre of the village. At the time, there were an estimated 900 date palm trees, 16 donkeys, 10 cattle, and 30 pearling boats belonging to Sanabis.

=== Present day ===
Sanabis is traditionally seen as a commercial centre alongside Seef and the Central Business District, this is evident due to the presence of multiple skyscrapers and malls. Native villagers from Sanabis are noted to have had a distinct accent.

The village, along with other villages in the country, is also the site for Muharram processions on the annual Day of Ashura and Arbaeen festivals respectively.

An illegal demonstration calling for a boycott of the controversial 2022 Bahraini general election was held in Sanabis on October 18 of that year.
