= City Centre Bahrain =

Shopping mall in Manama, Bahrain

- The Bahrain City Centre
- Location: Manama, Bahrain
- Coordinates: 26°13′59.85″N 50°33′14.10″E
- Opened: 1 September 2008
- Developer: Majid Al Futtaim Group
- Owner: Majid Al Futtaim Group
- Num. of stores: 350
- Floor area: 158,000 m^{2} (1,700,000 sq ft)
- Floors: 3
- Website: citycentrebahrain.com

City Centre Bahrain is a shopping mall located in the Seef District of Manama, in the Kingdom of Bahrain. It is owned and run by Majid Al Futtaim Properties, which owns several shopping malls across the Middle East.

== History ==
The shopping centre opened in September 2008 to be the largest in Bahrain. It claims 340 retail outlets, including anchors hypermarket Carrefour and luxury department store Saks Fifth Avenue, both the first in Bahrain, as well as 60 dining outlets.

The mall is designed to accommodate weekend visitors from Saudi Arabia across the King Fahd Causeway by featuring two Kempinski hotels and an indoor water park.

== Entertainment ==
Entertainment facilities include:

- Magic Planet is a family entertainment centre for kids and family.
- Wahooo! Waterpark was a 15,000 square metre climate-controlled indoor/outdoor water park.
- A 20-screen Cineco Cinema is spread across 8,000 square metres.
- It is home to over 40 exclusive brands, including 60 dining options and many quick snack break options.
- In 2025, the mall saw the addition of a artificial volcano with a flow rate of 250,000 litres.
- Train Strength & fitness is a massive fitness gym it includes a basketball court a pool and a padel court and much more activities

== Incidents ==
- A fire broke out in a restaurant chimney on 8 January 2020 and was extinguished within 55 minutes. The mall was evacuated as a precaution and there were no reported casualties.
- In January 2026, a bystander fell into the artificial volcano, leading to severe burns. Due to the incident, the volcano now has railings around its perimeter.
