= Al-Sakhir Palace =

Bahraini royal palace

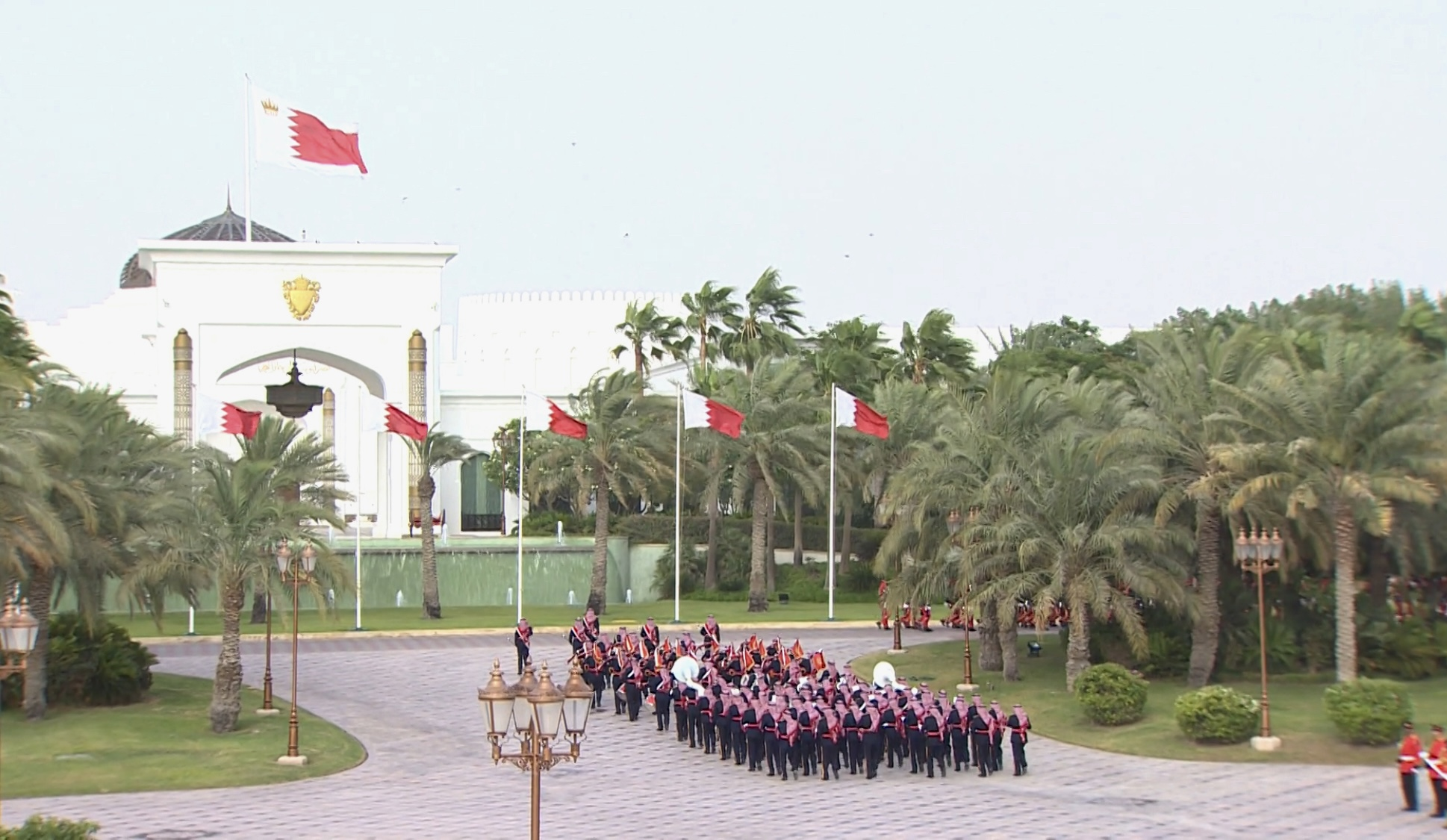
Al-Sakhir Palace

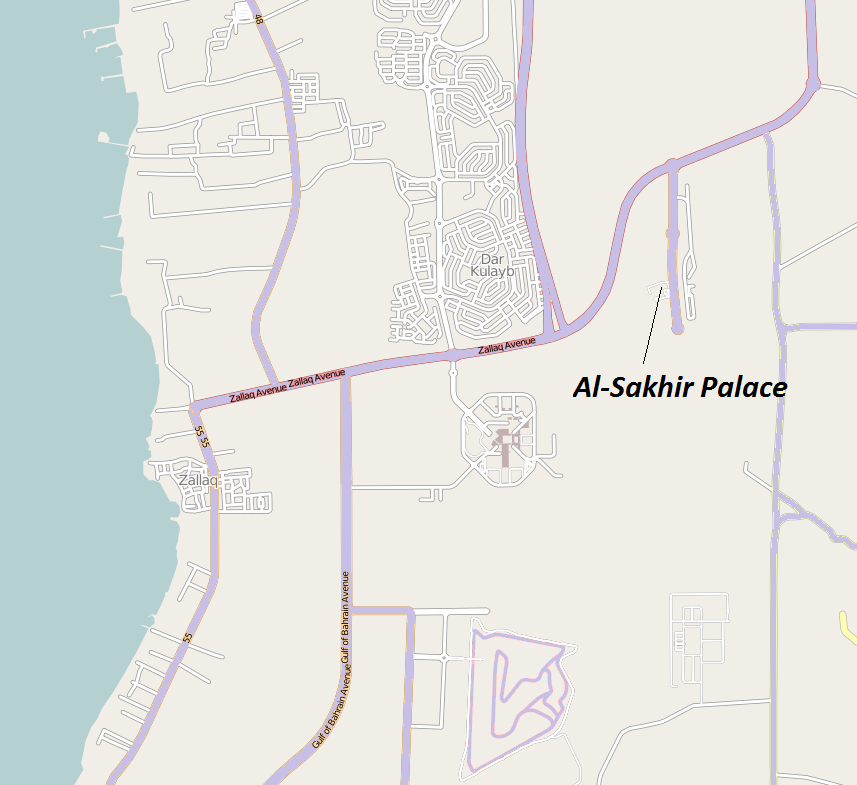

- Location within Bahrain

General information
- Type: Palace
- Location: Northeast of Zellaq, Bahrain
- Coordinates: 26°3′46″N 50°31′35″E
- Completed: 1901

Al-Sakhir Palace (Arabic: قصر الصخير), also known as Sakhir Palace, is a palace in the Sakhir desert region of western Bahrain. The palace lies off the Zallaq Highway, northeast of the Bahrain International Circuit, the town of Zallaq and the University of Bahrain. It lies southwest of Sadad, Shahrakan and Dar Kulaib, the nearest town to the palace.

== History ==
Built in either 1870 or 1901 depending on different sources, it is one of the most eminent buildings in the country. The extensive complex was once the residence of the ruler of Bahrain, Sheikh Hamad, who moved into the palace around 1925. He was very fond of the palace and lived there with his wife Hosha and regularly invited prominent noblemen and political figures from the United Kingdom and elsewhere to dine at the palace. However, the building was abandoned after his death at the palace in 1942, and remained locked and the windows shuttered for decades afterwards as a sign of respect. For years the palace stood isolated, although after the discovery of oil in 1928 in Bahrain the island developed considerably in other areas. Painter Christine Rollitt visited Bahrain in the 1970s and painted the palace in 1977. Still vacant in 1983, the palace underwent restoration to its former glory in the mid-1990s. The palace is approached passing a camel farm along Highway 105. Two kilometres from the palace, towards Zallaq, is an oil-pumping well which is decorated as a hoopoe bird. The Arabian Gulf University was built near the palace around 1985.

Today the palace is used for some of the most honorable and important occasions in Bahrain. George W. Bush visited the palace on January 12, 2008, and received a welcoming sword ceremony in the courtyard to the palace and was presented with an award by Bahrain's king, Hamad bin Isa Al-Khalifa. Bush's visit sparked off a demonstration outside the US Embassy in Manama, attracting some 300 people with placards such as "Bush is not welcome". On March 12, 2011, US Defense Secretary Robert Gates and Crown Prince Salman Bin Hamad Al Khalifa met with Bahrain's King Hamad bin Isa al-Khalifa at the palace. In April 2011 Bahrain honored Custodian of the Two Holy Mosques King Abdullah by giving him the historic Ajrab sword of Imam Turki bin Abdullah and the Sheikh Isa bin Salman Al-Khalifa Medal at ceremony at Al-Sakhir Palace. Hessa bint Salman Al Khalifa died at the palace in March 2009.

== Architecture ==
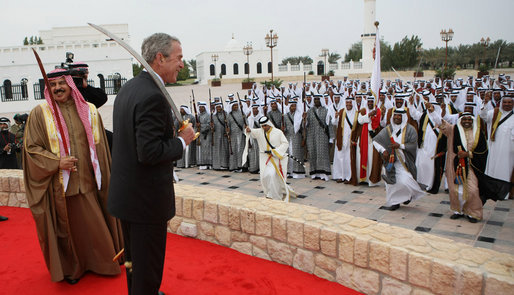
George W. Bush at Al Sakhir Palace, Bahrain

Al-Sakhir Palace was the work of a specialist group of builders of the Ruyan group headed by Zar Hydar Banna, who were also responsible for the Shayak Khalaf al-Asfur house. The palace is built in the traditional Islamic fashion, common in the Middle East, white, consisting mainly of grand arches and columns, a dome and an imposing minaret which towers above. The majlis of Al-Sakhir Palace is reportedly 40 feet (12 m) long. Sheikh Hamad had also visited England for the first time, along with his wife, son and brother, to buy plumbing fixtures and furniture for his Sakhir Palace.
