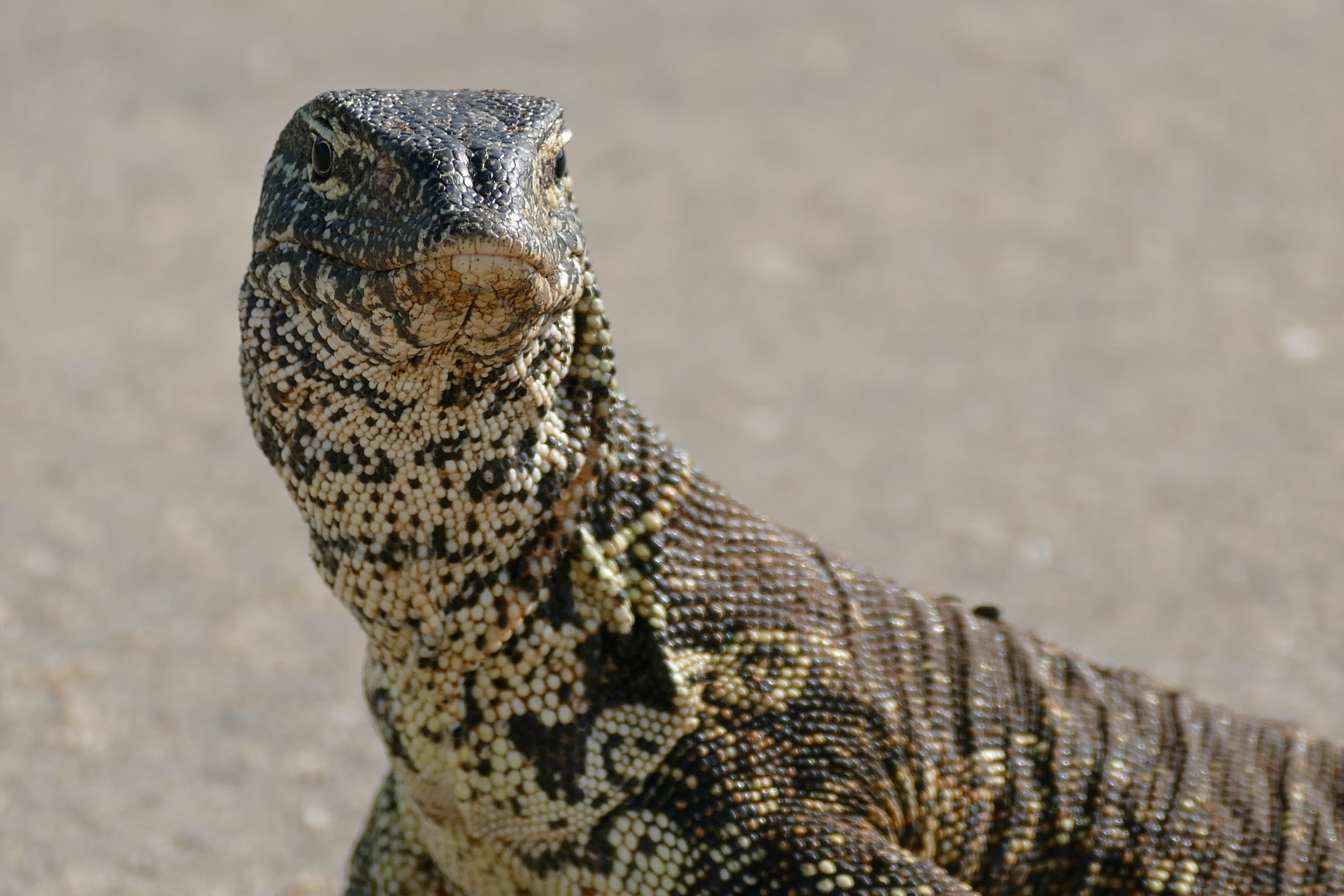
- Nile monitor in South Africa

Scientific classification
- Kingdom: Animalia
- Phylum: Chordata
- Class: Reptilia
- Order: Squamata
- Suborder: Anguimorpha
- Family: Varanidae
- Genus: Varanus
- Subgenus: Polydaedalus

Species
- Varanus albigularis; Varanus exanthematicus; Varanus niloticus; Varanus stellatus; Varanus ornatus; Varanus yemenensis; †Varanus rusingensis; †Varanus varswater

= Varanus (Polydaedalus) =

Subgenus of reptiles

Polydaedalus, commonly referred as African monitors, is one of the 11 subgenera of the genus Varanus. Its species are native to Africa and West Asia, among which are Africa's largest lizards.

== Description ==
African monitors are typically medium-sized monitor lizards, with males being larger than females. They are characterized by their tall heads and nostrils positioned close to their eyes. Their jaws are short and equipped with round, thick teeth. They have long necks and muscular tails, like all monitors do.

African monitors are relatively durophagous, possessing blunt posterior teeth that appear in adulthood.

=== Size ===
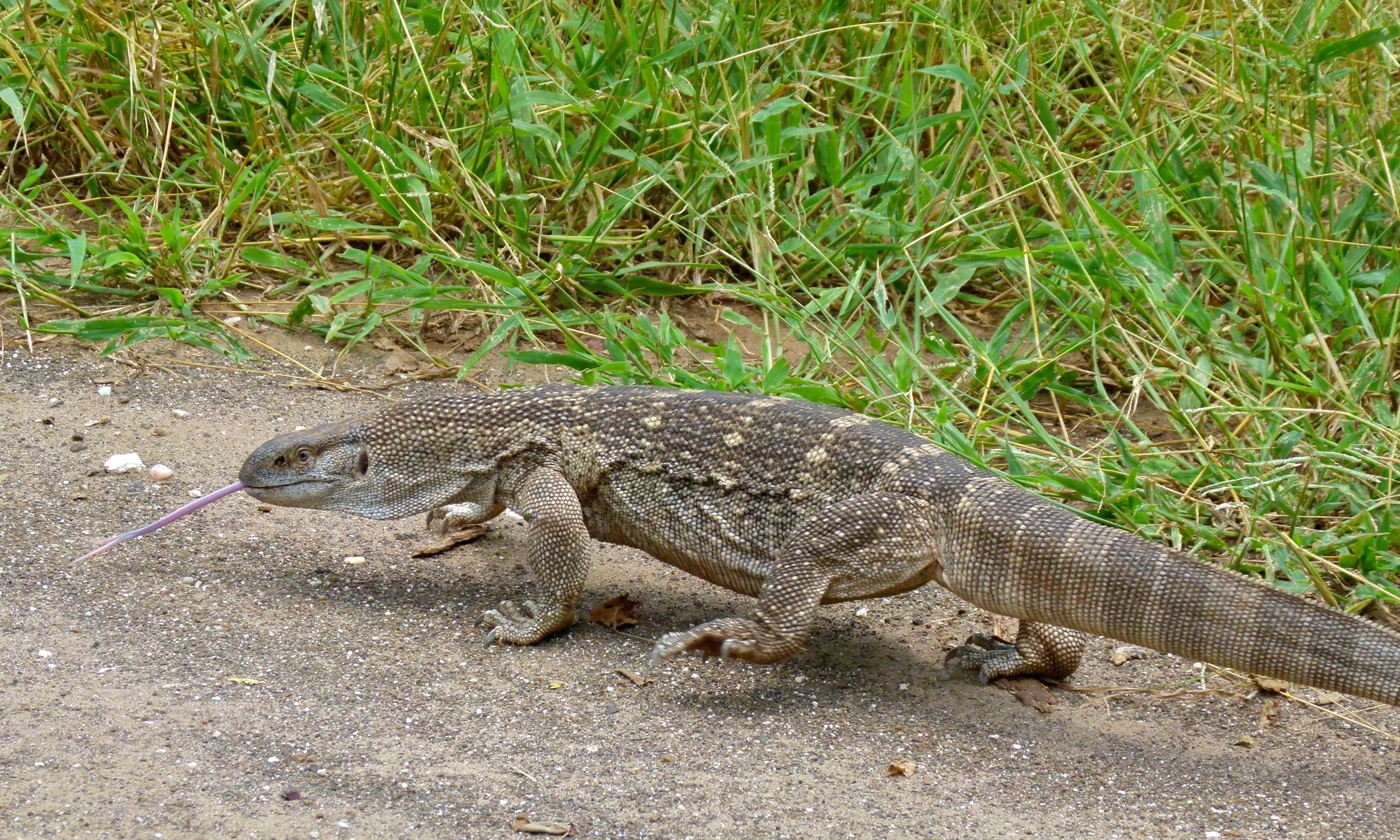
Varanus albigularis has the typical body build of an African monitor

African monitors produced the two largest species of monitors in Africa. Nile monitors usually measure 1 m (3 ft 3 in) in length and weighs around 5 kg (11 lb), with exceptionally large specimens exceeding 2.4 m (7 ft 10 in) in length and 20 kg (44 lb) in mass, making it not only the fourth largest lizard after the Komodo dragon, Asian water monitor and crocodile monitor, but also the second largest reptile in the Nile Basin after its crocodile counterpart. The rock monitor is much bulkier and is larger on average, but has a slightly smaller maximum size of just more than 2 m (6 ft 7 in) long but still weighing over 15 kg (33 lb), rivalling the perentie as the world's fifth largest lizard.

== Evolution and ecology ==
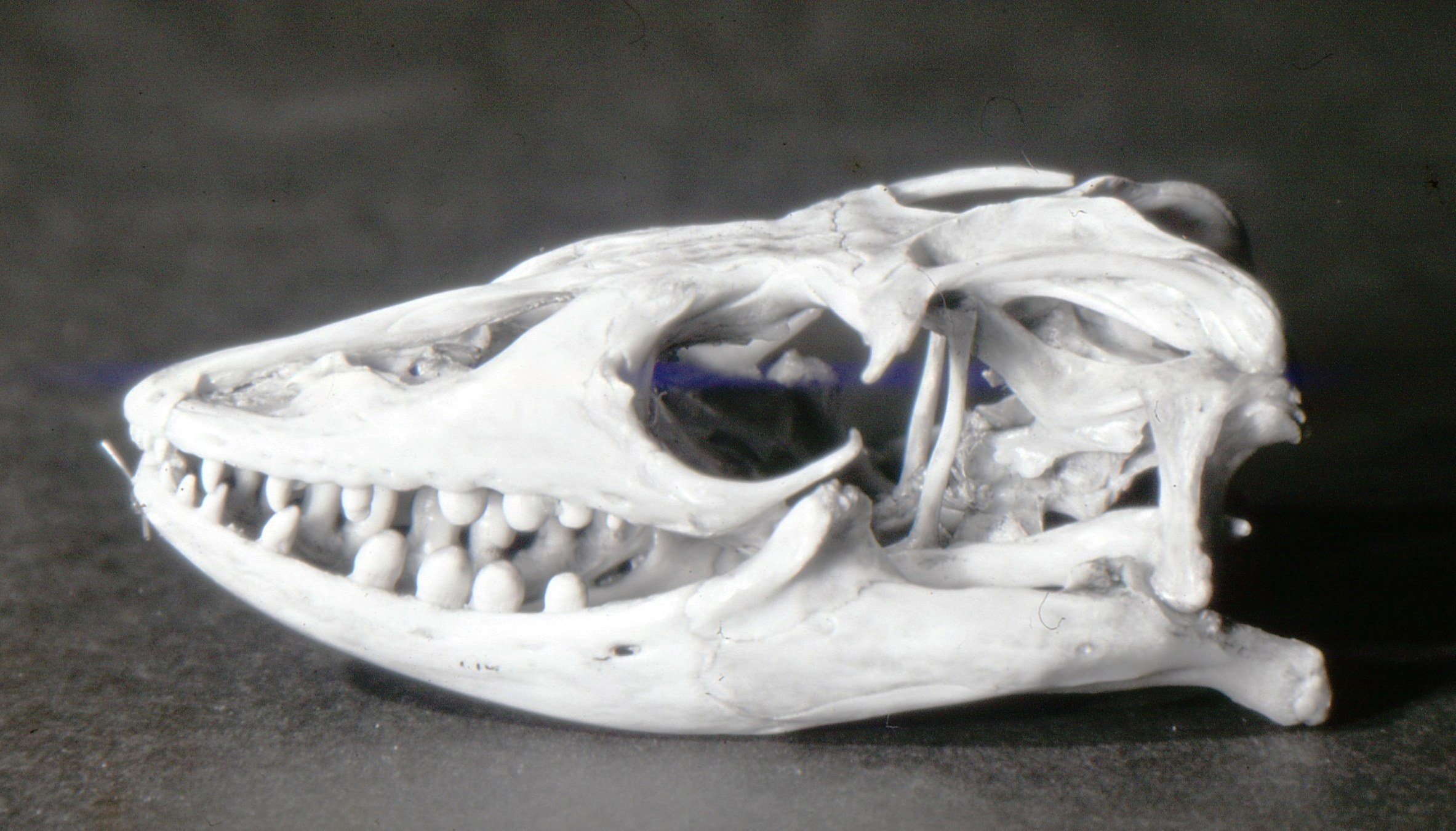
The tall skull and round teeth of a Nile monitor

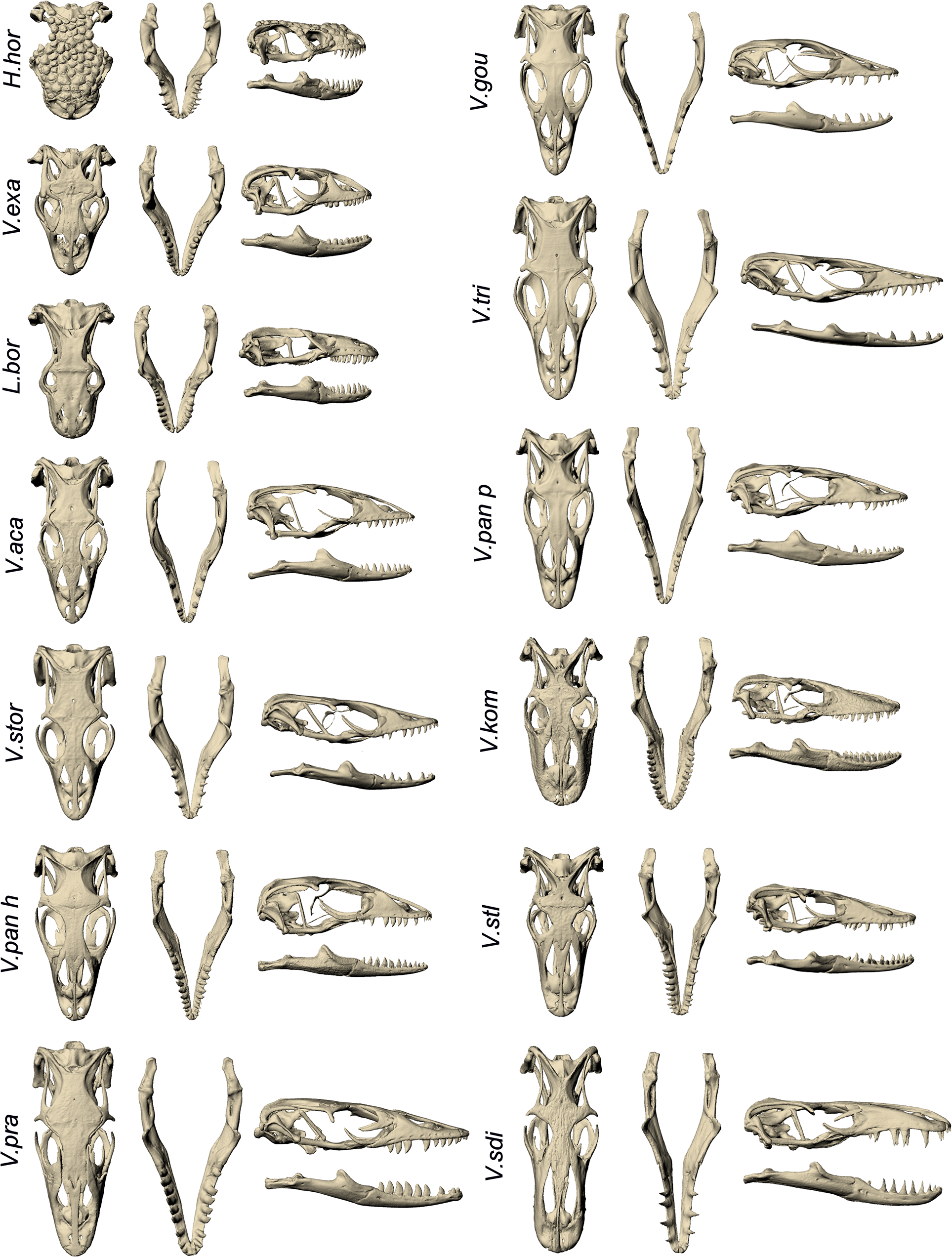
Skull anatomy of Varanus exanthematicus (2nd row on the left) compared with other Varanoids

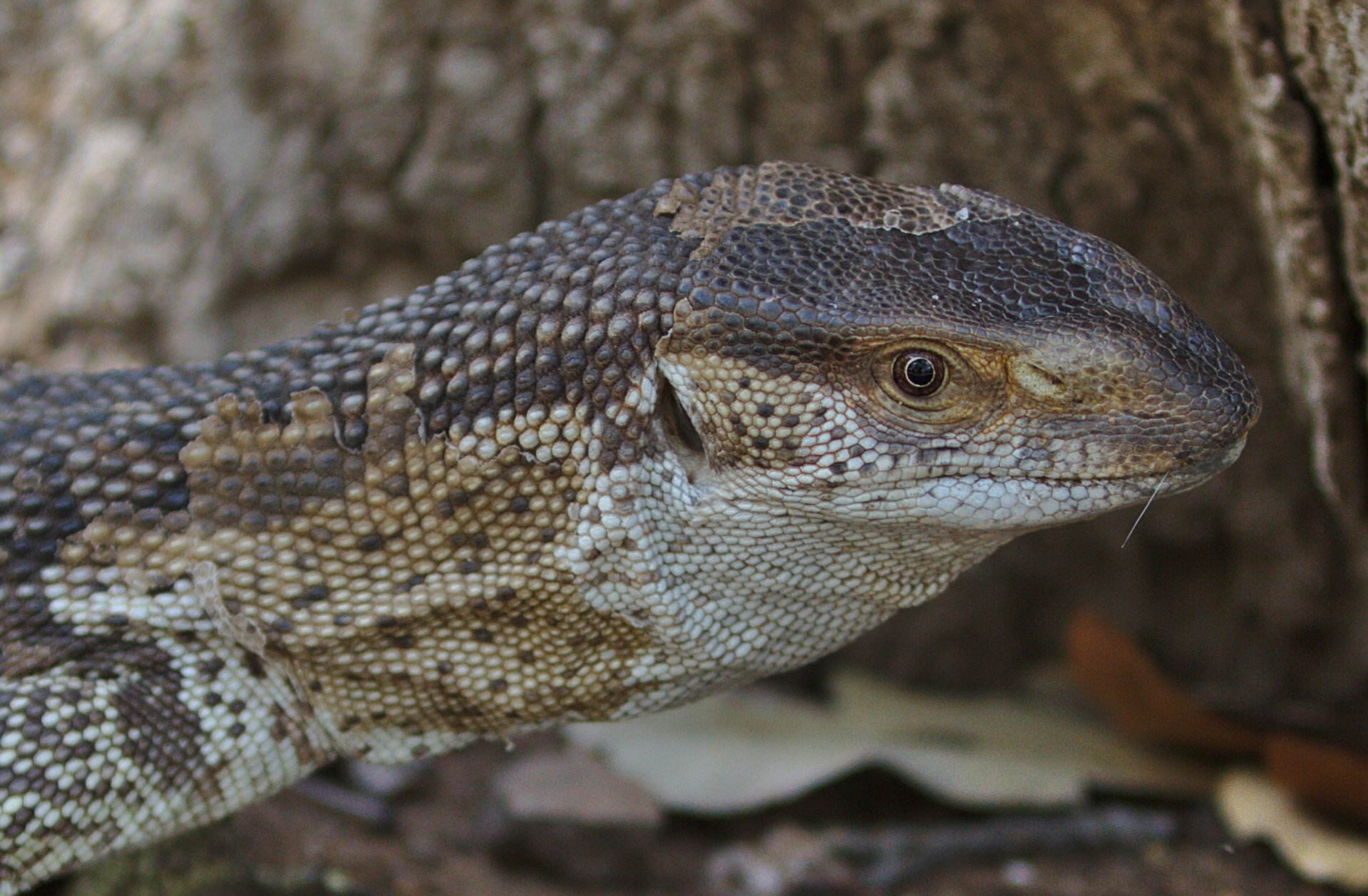
White-throated monitor

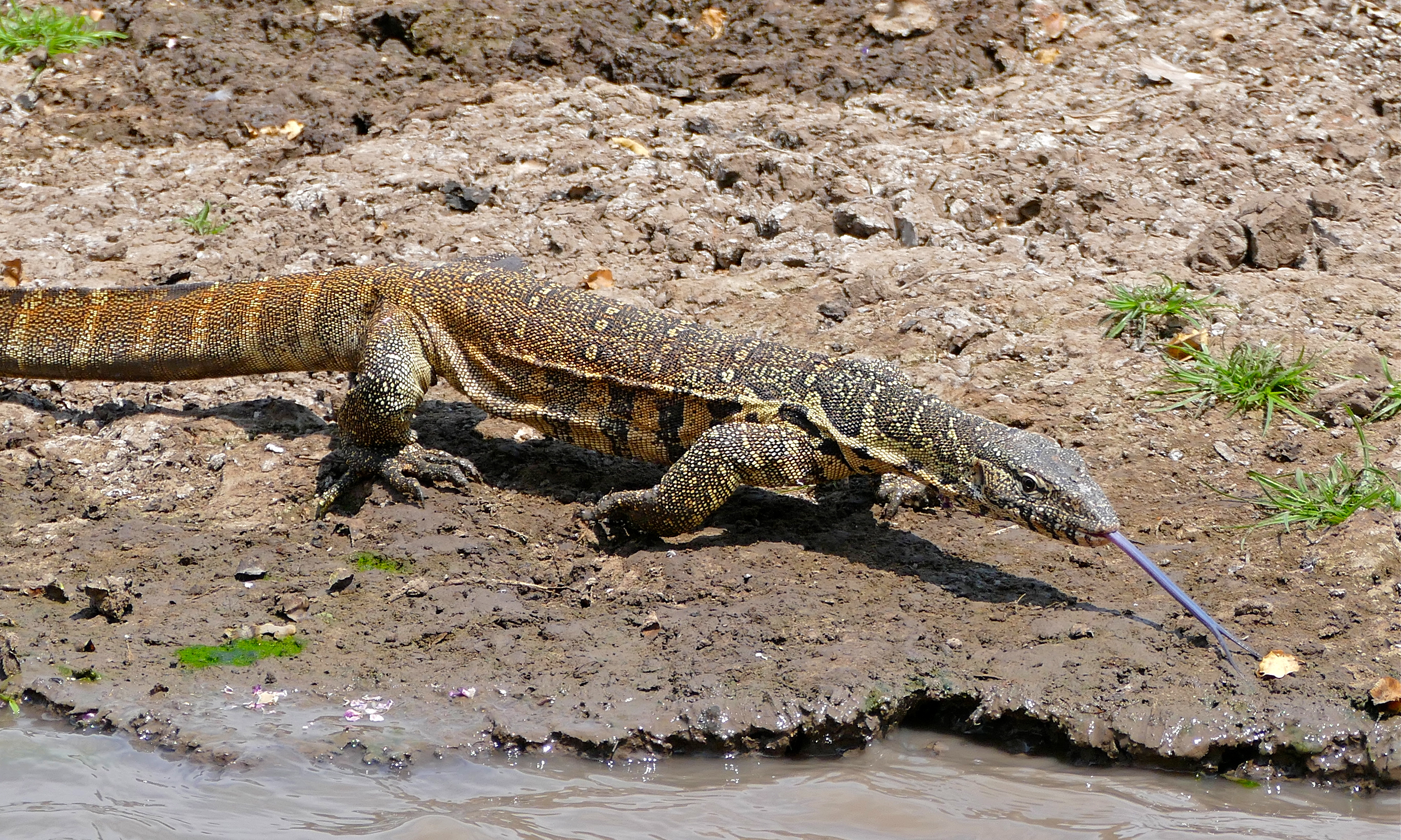
Nile monitor

The genus Varanus is believed to have originated in South Asia, and the anatomy of its earliest members are thought to resemble modern members of Empagusia, such as the Bengal monitor. Other monitors spread across the Old World in two directions: true monitors (subgenus Varanus), tree monitors (subgenus Hapturosaurus) and dwarf monitors (subgenus Odatria) moved east towards Southeast Asia and Oceania, quickly diversifying into different niches. Meanwhile, desert monitors (subgenus Psammosaurus) and African monitors (subgenus Polydaedalus) moved west towards Central Asia, the Middle East and Africa, developing a corporal built that is suited for a diet in a dry region: tall skulls and round teeth can crush shells of invertebrates easily, and caudally positioned nostrils can help them avoid breathing sand particles in the air while travelling through dry and dusty areas, such as deserts. Despite so, the Nile monitor, living in the Nile Basin with a rich resource of freshwater, has adapted a piscivorous diet, feeding mostly on fish. The rock monitor, being large and able to swallow large prey, often seek chances to eat turtles, which contributes most of its vertebrate food.

African monitors thrive throughout the African continent. Nile monitors are the most populous lizards in Africa, with over 4 million widely distributed across Sub-Sahara in all habitats but deserts. Rock monitors are also abundant, having 4 subspecies and a combined population in the millions.

== Fossil record ==
Two fossil species clade within the African monitors:

- †V. rusingensis (Miocene, Kenya)
- †V. varswater (Pliocene, South Africa)
