= Abdullah bin Khalaf Al Dossari =

Bahraini politician (born 1961)

Abdullah bin Khalaf Al Dossari (Arabic: عبد الله خلف الدوسري; born 26 February 1961 in Zallaq) is a Bahraini journalist, poet, and politician.

He obtained his high school diploma in 1976, and worked as a financial affairs officer at the Historical Documents Centre of the Royal Court from 1982 to 2002. He heads the Folk Poetry Society. He was chosen as a member of the jury of the puzzle competition held annually by Mohammed bin Rashid Al Maktoum, the ruler of the Emirate of Dubai.

In the 2002 Bahraini general election for the Council of Representatives, he won the fourth district seat in the Southern Governorate with 699 votes, or 67.54% in the runoff. In the 2006 Bahraini general election, he won with 656 votes or 62.90%. Finally, in the 2010 Bahraini general election, he won by acclamation after all rivals withdrew.

In October 2014, he was appointed Secretary-General of Parliament, an Undersecretary-level federal government position.
