= Nadine Al Shaikh =

Nadine Al Shaikh is an artist and gallery owner from Bahrain.

== Biography ==
Al Shaikh was born and grew up in Tubli, Bahrain. Her father, Bahraini Ali Shaikh, was an art teacher at the Ministry of Education. Al Shaikh opened her first art gallery in Umm Al Hassam in 2007, and a second gallery in Ghufool in 2008. She hosts the annual Bahraini Female Artists exhibition in her galleries.
