= Sakhir =

Desert area in Bahrain

Coordinates: 26.0333°N 50.5167°E

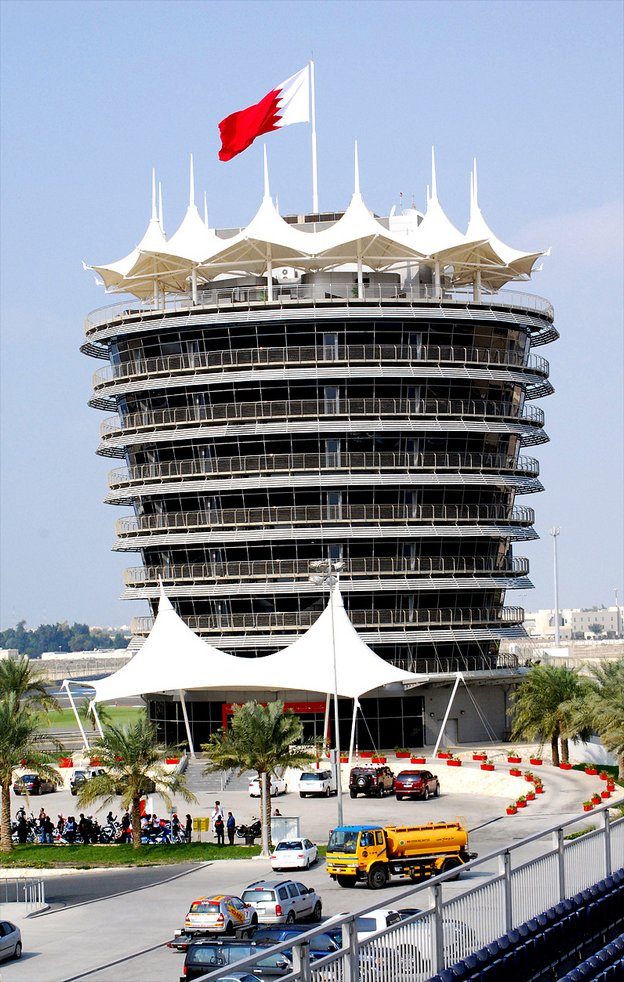
The VIP tower at the Bahrain International Circuit, in Sakhir.

Sakhir (Arabic: الصخير, romanized: Aṣ-Ṣaḫīr) is a desert area located in the Southern Governorate of Bahrain, near Zallaq. It contains the Al-Sakhir Palace, built in either 1870 or 1901 depending on different sources. It also is the current location of the Bahrain Grand Prix in Formula One, the Bahrain International Circuit

Camping in Sakhir during the winter months is a popular activity in the country.

== Notable sites ==
In the early 2000s, the area saw many changes such as the creation of the University of Bahrain main campus and Bahrain International Circuit, the home of Formula One's Bahrain Grand Prix. During the 2020 Formula One season, the track hosted a second race, the Sakhir Grand Prix, using an alternate track layout.

Sakhir is also the location of the biannual Bahrain International Airshow as well as the Al Areen Wildlife Park, the only nature reserve and zoo located on land in Bahrain.

Bell Sports, an American manufacturer of bicycle and motorsport helmets, has a showroom located near Bahrain International Circuit.
