= Dar Kulaib =

- Dar Kulaib within Kingdom of Bahrain
- Coordinates: 26.0679°N 50.5050°E
- Country: Kingdom of Bahrain
- Governorate: Northern Governorate

Dar Kulaib (Arabic: دار كليب) is a village situated in the western part of the Kingdom of Bahrain. The village is close to the Bahrain International Circuit, where the Bahrain Grand Prix takes place annually.

== History ==
The village has been a hotspot for clashes between anti-government protesters and police, during the Bahrain uprising.

== Administrative Division ==
The village is to the south of Shahrakan and west of Hamad Town, all of which are in the Northern Governorate administrative region. Dar Kulaib lies in constituency nine, along with Malkiya, Karzakan, Demistan, Sadad and Shahrakan.

== Sports ==
The village is known for its successful volleyball team, which won multiple titles in the 2000s.
