= Gufool =

Gufool (Qufool) القفول
- Neighborhood
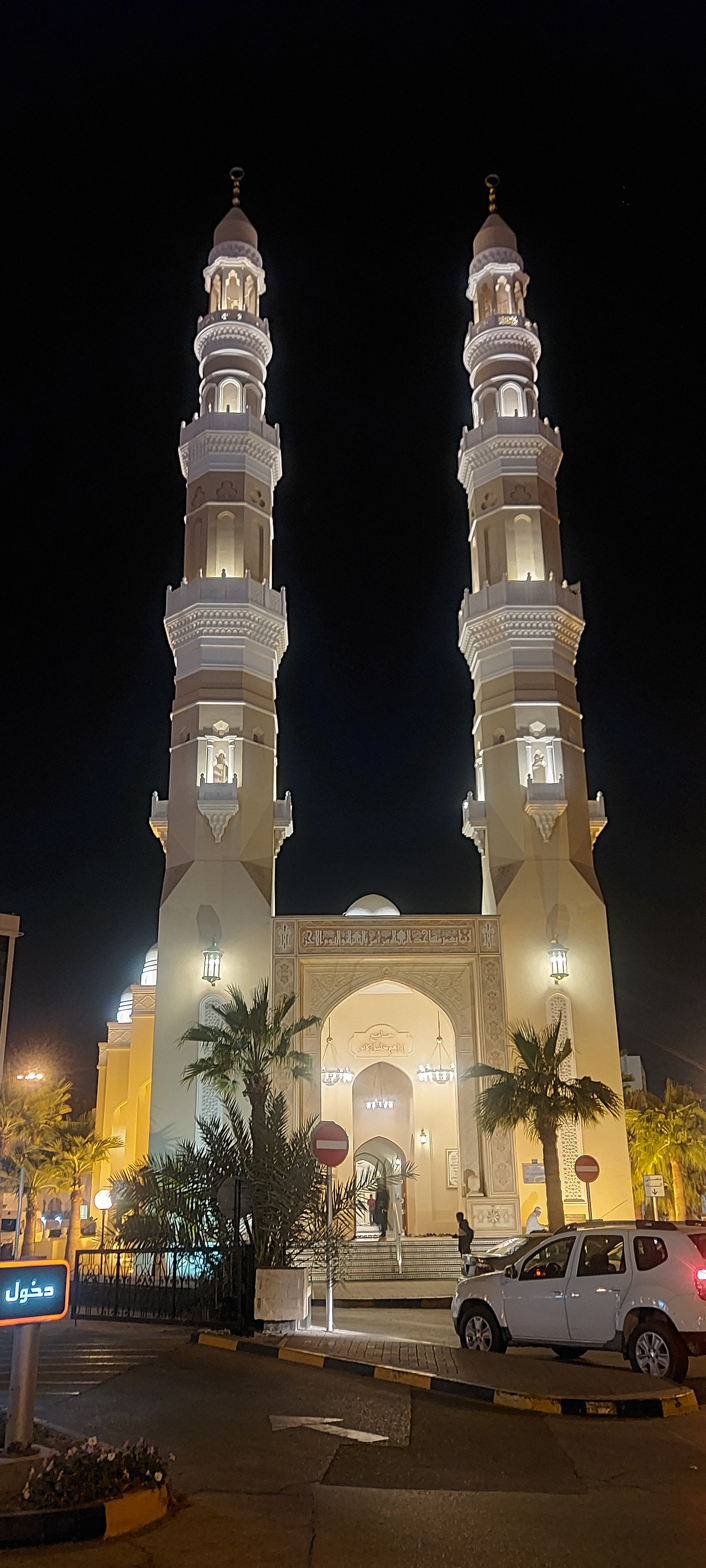
- Ebrahim Khalil Kanoo mosque, in Gufool.
- Country: Bahrain
- Governorate: Capital Governorate
- Time zone: +03:00

Gufool, also commonly referred to as Qufool (Arabic: القفول), is a mixed residential and commercial neighborhood of the city of Manama, in the Kingdom of Bahrain. The area is most famous for having a water garden, along with having a Dairy Queen franchise. The neighborhood is very diverse, containing residents from Pashtun, Sindhi, Tamil, and Punjabi backgrounds.

== History ==
Prior to rapid urbanization of the area, Gufool was known for its vast date palms and greenery. Now, Gufool is primarily known for their water garden which was founded in the 1970s as a popular recreational destination amongst residents in Bahrain. In 1982, Gufool received a Dairy Queen franchise, one of first fast food chains to operate in Bahrain. In 2017, the water garden was closed down for an extensive reconstruction project which cost 2.5 million Bahraini dinars. This project saw the construction of two man-made lakes, recreational zones for family and children, alongside sports facilities and other infrastructure. Local animal life were relocated to the Al Areen Wildlife Park, Bahrain's national wildlife sanctuary, prior to this construction. Specific trees planted in the water park include mango, pomegranate, fig and lemon trees. It reopened in March 2021.

Gufool is often a focal site for transportation services into the historic centre of Manama during the Islamic mourning month of Muharram in Bahrain. The area is also the site of local art galleries, such as Al Riwaq Art Space and 56 Art Gallery. Along with many other residential areas in Bahrain, Gufool contains amenities such as corner stores, restaurants, and karak stands.

== Geography ==
Gufool is situated in the Bahraini capital Manama. It lies north to the Salmaniya district of the city which is home to Salmaniya Medical Complex, Bahrain's largest public hospital. Gufool is south of the Noaim district of Manama, as well as the village of Sanabis. Gufool is also situated between many famous Bahraini landmarks, such as Bab Al Bahrain, Khamis Mosque, Adhari Park, and the Manama Souq.
