= Yemen monitor =

Conservation status
- Data Deficient (IUCN 3.1)

Scientific classification
- Kingdom: Animalia
- Phylum: Chordata
- Class: Reptilia
- Order: Squamata
- Suborder: Anguimorpha
- Family: Varanidae
- Genus: Varanus
- Subgenus: Polydaedalus
- Species: V. yemenensis

Binomial name
- Varanus yemenensis Böhme, Joger & Schätti, 1989

Species of lizard

The Yemen monitor (Varanus yemenensis) is a species of Varanus that lives in Yemen and southwestern Saudi Arabia.

== Discovery ==
Although the species was first described in 1988 by Wolfgang Böhme et al. under the name Varanus yemensis, specimens have been collected since the late 19th century to be held by the British Museum by 1903. However, it was assumed that they were mislabelled and actually came from Africa. The discovery was made in an odd manner: two years before the first description Wolfgang Böhme recognized a yet undescribed species of monitor lizard filmed in a TV documentary about nature in Yemen. A few months later, 8 voucher specimens were brought to Europe. The holotype specimen is ZFMK 46500, a subadult.

== Distribution ==
The Yemen monitor inhabits mainly the Tihama, which is the southwest coast of the Arabian Peninsula from Ta'izz and Khobar to the south of Wadi Maraba and the foothills of the southwestern Arabian mountain range. It occurs at altitudes from 300 to 1800 meters and is not found in the coastal lowlands. The animals live mainly in savannah-like areas or lighter forests, of which the soil mostly consists of sand and stones.

== Description ==
Yemen monitors are stoutly built and grow up to 110 cm (3.6 ft) long. The nasal, temporal and parietal area is swollen, the oblique and slit-like nostril sits right in front of the eyes. Yemen monitor are dark brown and striped with lines that are more or less pronounced depending on the individual. The tail also has dark lines, is strongly laterally compressed and has a median crest. A characteristic feature of Yemen's Waran is the striking yellow lines over the snout. The lines are black for specimens from the highlands near Ta'izz.

== Habitat ==
The Yemen monitor often lives close to shallow water or in dry river beds. During the driest season of the year in the months from January to March its activity may be reduced or even suspended.

== Behaviour ==
Deep burrows are excavated under rocks and tree stumps. They are relatively docile in captivity for a monitor.

Its diet mostly consists of invertebrates such as snails and insects, especially beetles. Large vertebrate prey are presumably taken as well when given the chance to.
