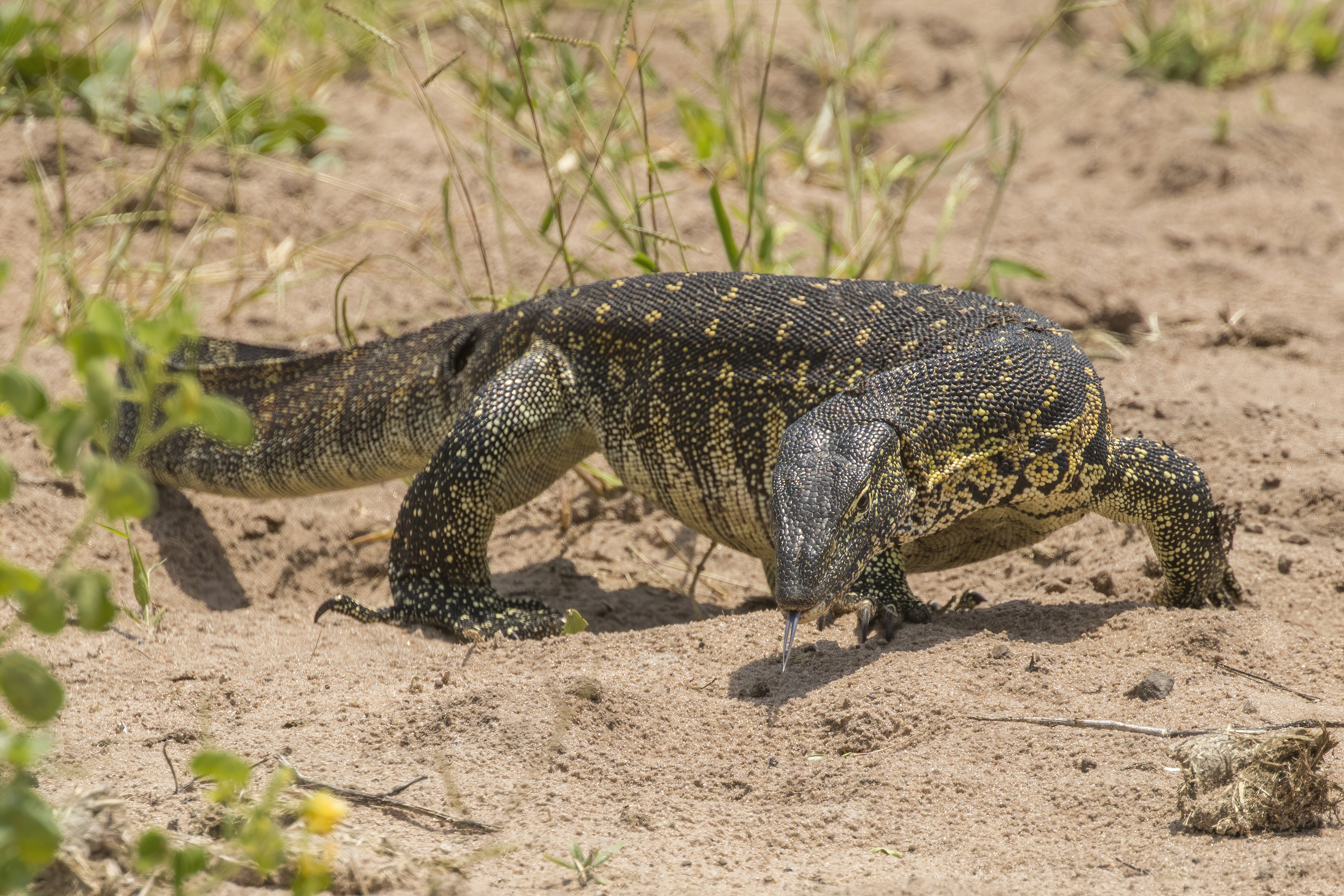
- Botswana
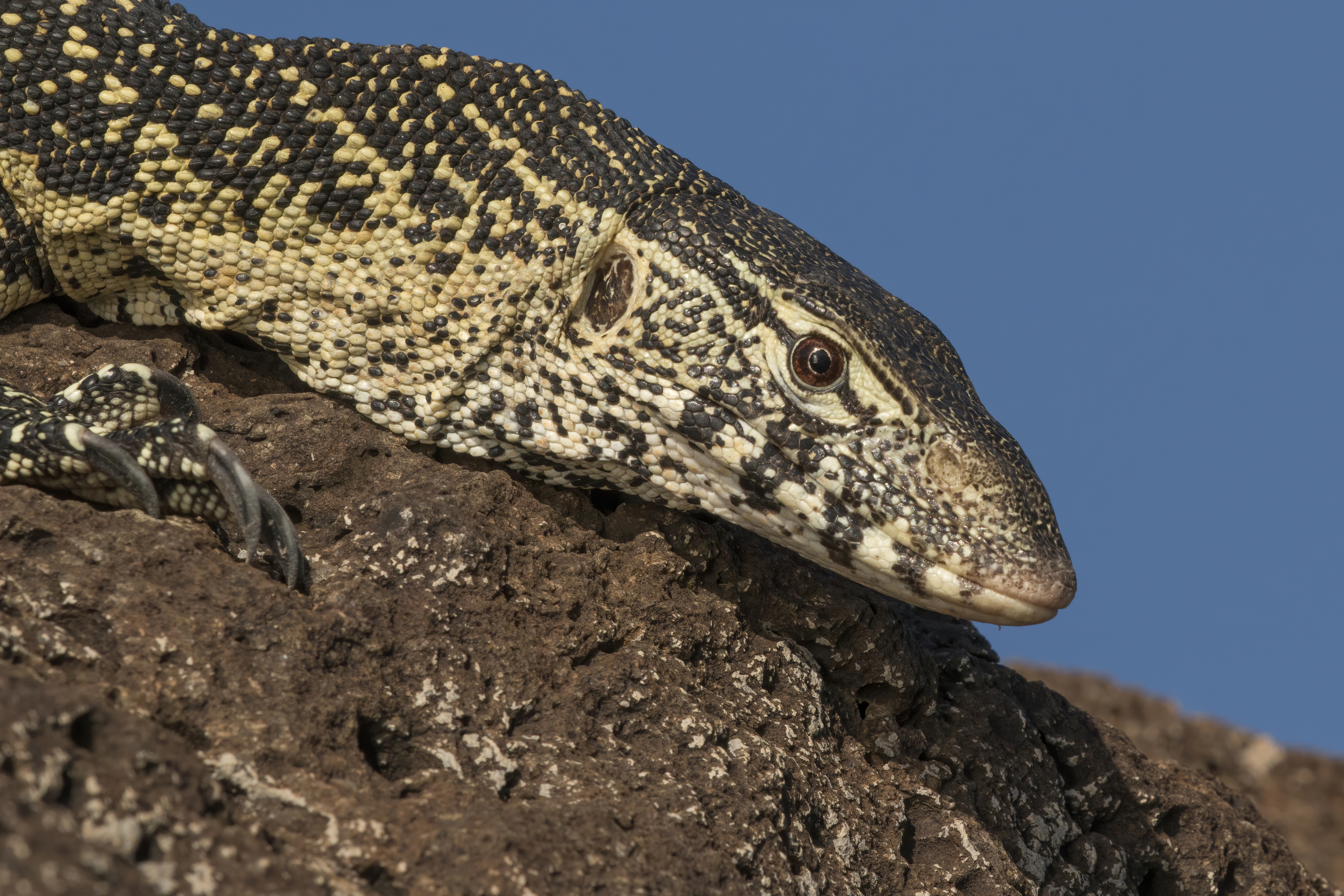
- Lake Baringo, Kenya

Conservation status
- Least Concern (IUCN 3.1)
- CITES Appendix II

Scientific classification
- Kingdom: Animalia
- Phylum: Chordata
- Class: Reptilia
- Order: Squamata
- Suborder: Anguimorpha
- Family: Varanidae
- Genus: Varanus
- Subgenus: Polydaedalus
- Species: V. niloticus

Binomial name
- Varanus niloticus (Linnaeus, 1766)
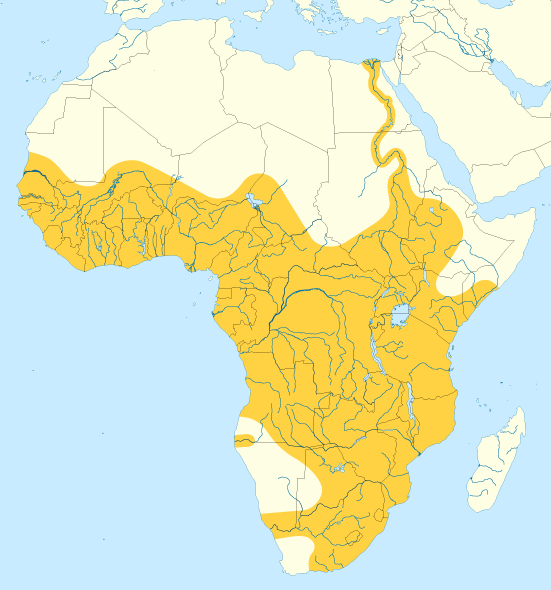
- Nile monitor's native range (including West Africa Nile monitor, now often recognized as a separate species)

Synonyms
- List: Lacerta monitor Linnaeus, 1758 — nomen rejectum; Lacertus tupinambis Lacépède, 1788; Lacerta capensis Sparrman, 1783; Lacerta nilotica Linnaeus, 1766; Tupinambis elegans Daudin, 1802; Tupinambus ornatus Daudin, 1803; Monitor niloticus Lichtenstein, 1818; Monitor pulcher Leach, 1819; Stellio saurus Laurenti, 1768; Varanus niloticus Mertens, 1942; Varanus (Polydaedalus) niloticus ornatus Mertens, 1942; Varanus (Polydaedalus) ornatus Böhme & Ziegler, 1997

= Nile monitor =

Nile monitor Temporal range: Miocene-Recent

Species of lizard

The Nile monitor (Varanus niloticus) is a large member of the monitor family (Varanidae) found throughout most of Sub-Saharan Africa, particularly in drier regions, and along the Nile River and its tributaries in East Africa. Additionally, there are modern, invasive populations in North America. The population found in West African forests and savannahs is sometimes recognized as a separate species, the West African Nile monitor (V. niloticus stellatus) and Ornate monitor (V. niloticus ornatus). While it is dwarfed by its larger relatives, such as the Komodo dragon, the Asian water monitor or the crocodile monitor, it is still one of the largest lizards in the world, reaching (and even surpassing) Australia's perentie in size. Other common names include the African small-grain lizard, as well as iguana and various forms derived from it, such as guana, water leguaan or river leguaan (leguan, leguaan, and likkewaan mean monitor lizard in South African English, and can be used interchangeably).

A feral population of Nile monitors (descended from escaped or intentionally-released pets) has become established in several locations in South Florida. In addition to any illegally-released animals, it is speculated that during particularly intense hurricane seasons in Florida, many reptiles potentially escape when their enclosures are damaged or inadvertently unlocked; as Florida has a semi-tropical to tropical climate, many reptiles are housed outdoors, and poorly-secured enclosures may become damaged during bad storms. Along with Nile monitors, Florida is infamous for its feral populations of agamas, Argentine black and white tegus, Burmese pythons, green iguanas, Madagascar giant day geckos, and panther and veiled chameleons, among others. Many of these species are thought to be descendants of hurricane escapees.

== Taxonomy ==
Members of the Nile monitor species group were already well known to Africans in ancient times. For example, they were commonly caught, likely as food, in the Djenné-Djenno culture at least a millennium ago.

The Nile monitor twice was given a scientific name by Carl Linnaeus: First as Lacerta monitor in 1758 in the 10th edition of Systema Naturae, the starting point of zoological nomenclature. He described it again in 1766 as Lacerta nilotica. Despite being older, the name proposed in 1758 is invalid because it was rejected in ICZN opinion 540, making the name of 1766 valid. The genus Varanus was coined in 1820 by Blasius Merrem. Six years later Leopold Fitzinger moved the Nile monitor into this genus as Varanus niloticus, the currently accepted scientific name for the species.

=== Species complex ===
As traditionally defined, the Nile monitor is a species complex. The ornate monitor (V. ornatus) and West African Nile monitor (V. stellatus) were described as species in 1802 and 1803 by François Marie Daudin. In 1942, Robert Mertens moved them both into the Nile monitor (V. niloticus); as synonyms or as a valid subspecies. This was the standard treatment until 1997, when a taxonomic review based on color and morphology indicated that the ornate monitor is distinctive and revalidated it as a separate species from rainforests of West and Central Africa. In 2016, a review based primarily on genetics came to another result. They found that monitors from West African forests and adjacent savannah are distinctive and worthy of recognition as a separate species: the West African Nile monitor (V. stellatus). It is estimated to have split from the others in the Nile monitor complex about 7.7 million years ago, making it older than the split between humans and chimpanzees. In contrast, those in the Central African rainforests are genetically similar to the Nile monitor. This essentially splits the ornate monitor—as defined in 1997—into two: the western being the West African Nile monitor and the eastern (of Central African rainforests) being moved back into the Nile monitor. As the type locality for the ornate monitor is in the Central African country of Cameroon, the scientific name V. ornatus becomes a synonym of V. niloticus. Individuals with the "ornate color pattern" and individuals with the "Nile color pattern" occur in both the West African Nile monitor and the Nile monitor, with the "ornate" appearing to be more frequent in densely forested habitats.

With the West African Nile monitor as a separate species, there are two main clades in the Nile monitor: A widespread clade found throughout much of Southern, Central and East Africa, as well as more locally in coastal West Africa. The other clade includes the monitors of the Sahel (Mali to Ethiopia) and Nile regions. Despite the differences, the Reptile Database maintains both the ornate monitor and West African Nile monitor as synonyms of the Nile monitor, but do note that this broad species definition includes distinctive subpopulations.

== Description ==
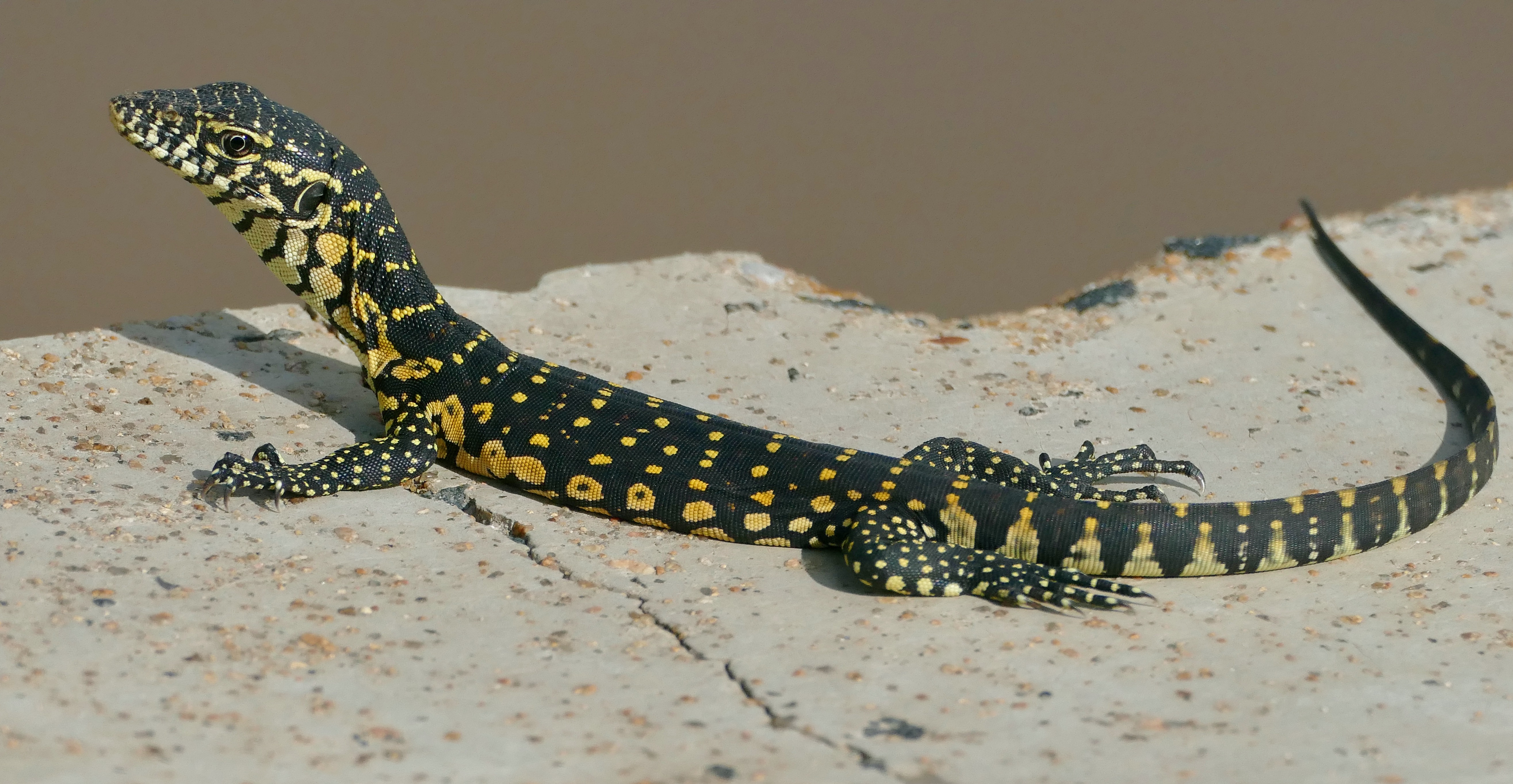
Juvenile, Kruger National Park

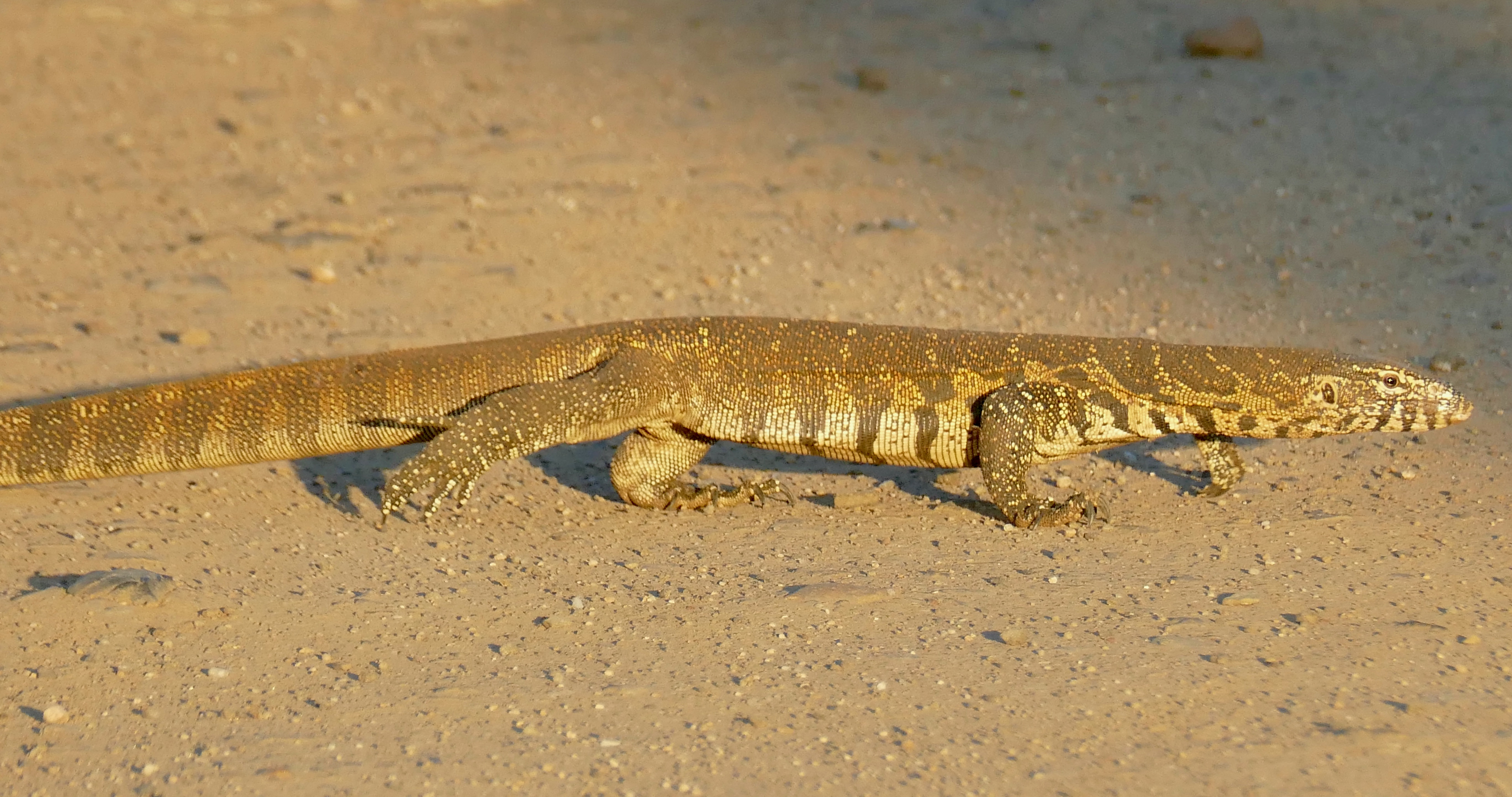
Adult, Kruger National Park

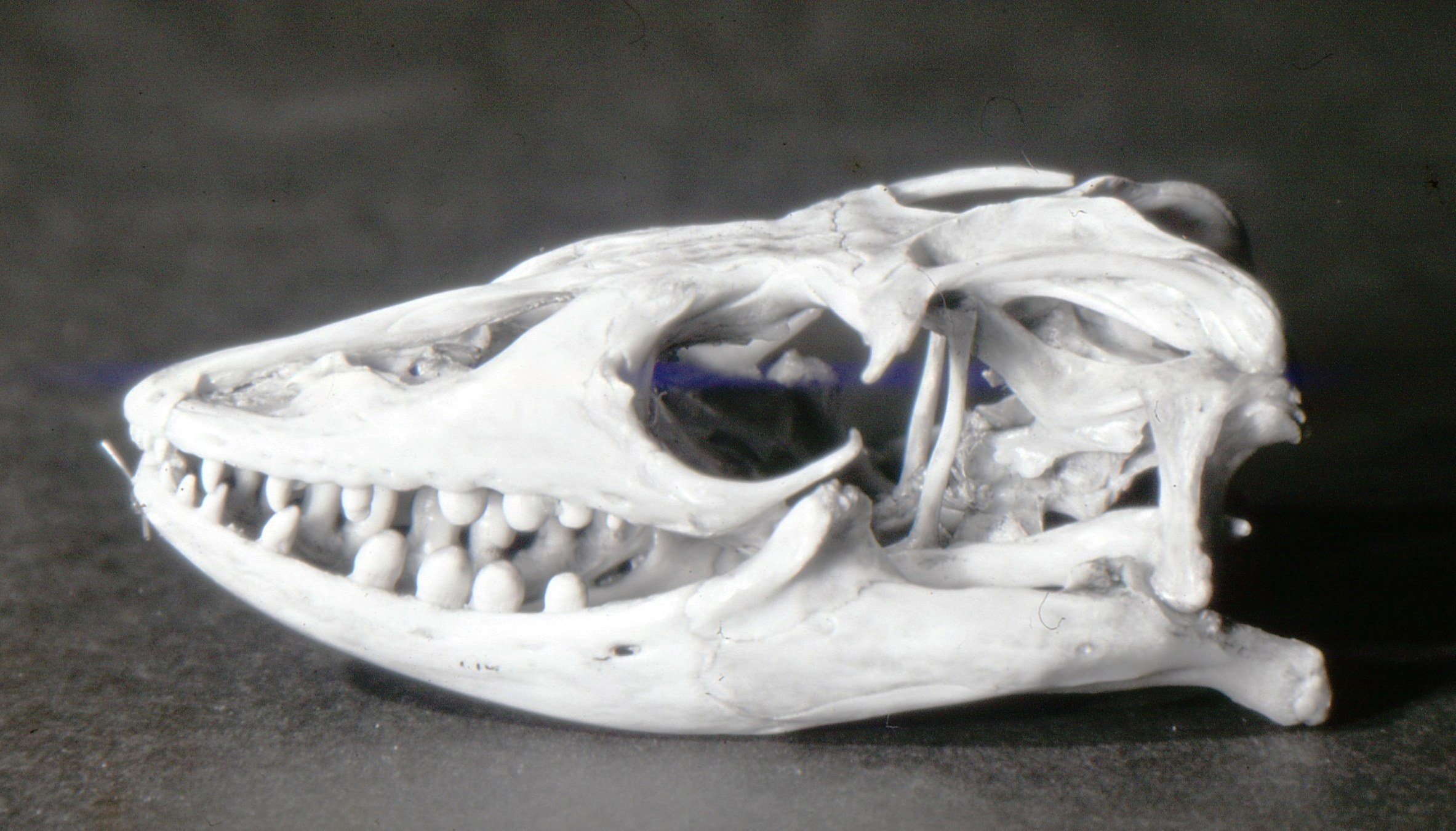
Adult dentition is blunt

The Nile monitor is Africa's longest lizard. They grow from about 120 to 220 cm (3 ft 11 in to 7 ft 3 in) in length, with the largest specimens attaining 244 cm (8 ft). In an average-sized specimen, the snout-to-vent length will be around 50 cm (1 ft 8 in). In body mass, adults have been reported to vary widely, one study claiming only 0.8 to 1.7 kg (1.8 to 3.7 lb), others state weights ranging from 5.9 to 15 kg (13 to 33 lb) in big monitors. Variations may be due to age or environmental conditions. Exceptionally large specimens may scale as much as 20 kg (44 lb), but this species weighs somewhat less on average than the bulkier rock monitor.

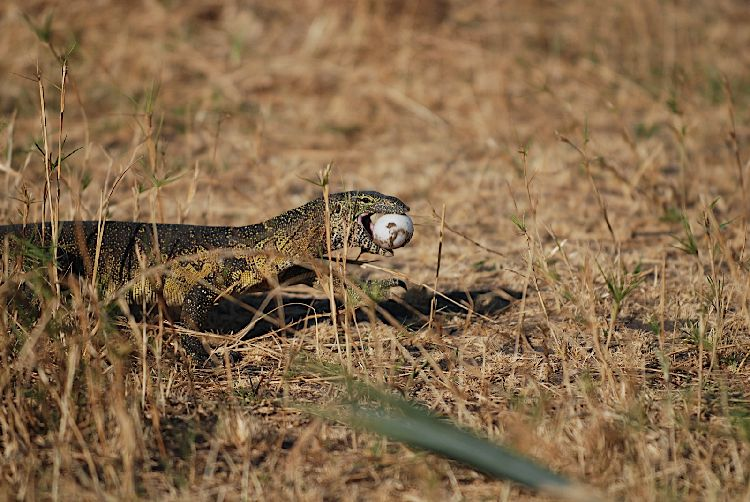
Nile monitor eating crocodile egg, Katavi National Park

They have muscular bodies, strong legs, and powerful jaws. Their teeth are sharp and pointed in juvenile animals and become blunt and peg-like in adults. They also possess sharp claws used for climbing, digging, defense, or tearing at their prey. Like all monitors, they have forked tongues, with highly developed olfactory properties. The Nile monitor has quite striking, but variable, skin patterns, as they are greyish-brown above with greenish-yellow barring on the tail and large, greenish-yellow rosette-like spots on their backs with a blackish tiny spot in the middle. Their throats and undersides are an ochre-yellow to a creamy-yellow, often with faint barring.

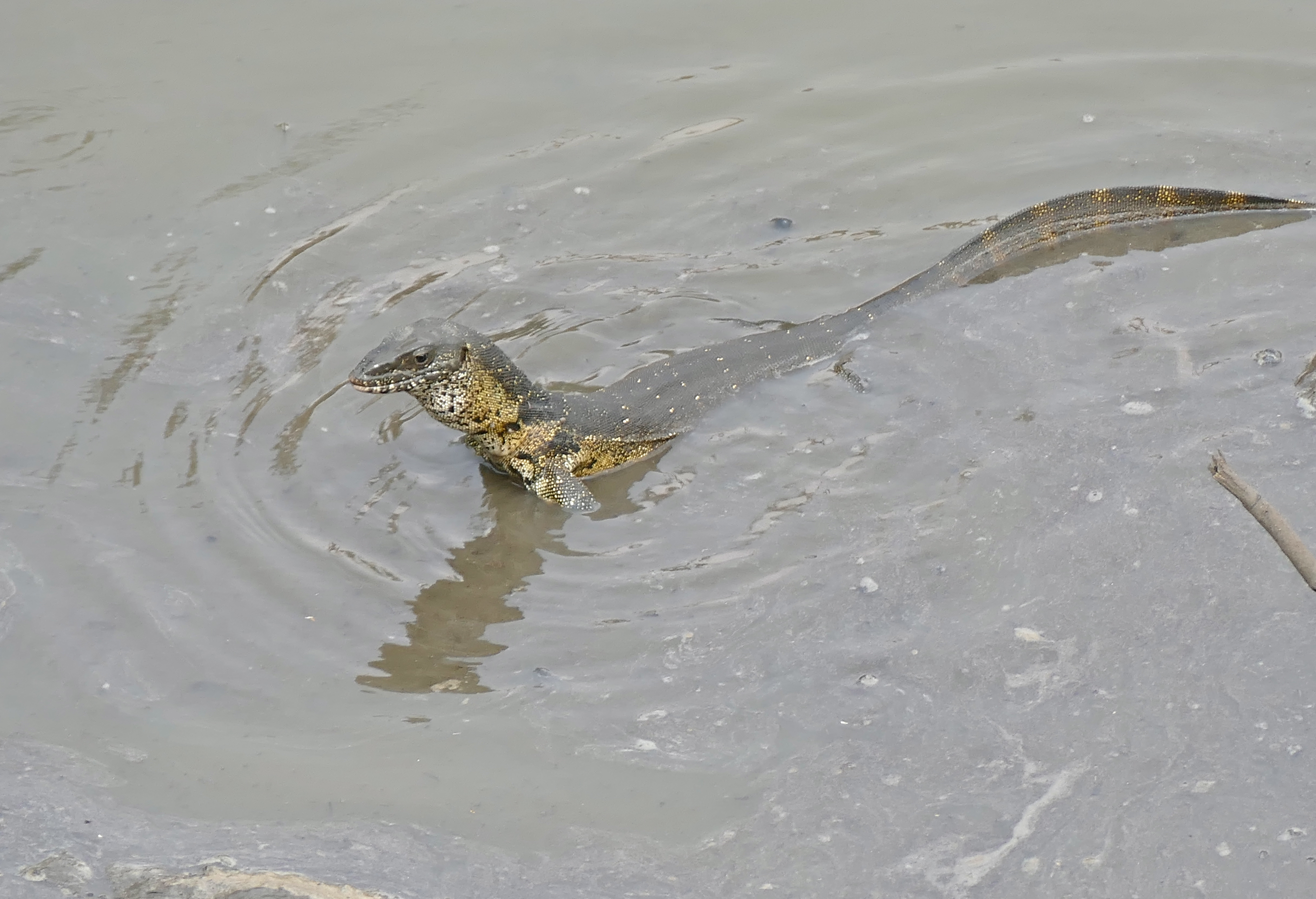
Nile monitors are excellent swimmers

Their nostrils are placed high on their snouts, indicating these animals are very well adapted for an aquatic lifestyle. They are also excellent climbers and quick runners on land. Nile monitors feed on a wide variety of prey items, including fish, frogs and toads (even poisonous ones of the genera Breviceps and Sclerophrys), small reptiles (such as turtles, snakes, lizards, and young crocodiles), birds, rodents, other small mammals (up to domestic cats and young antelopes [Raphicerus]), eggs (including those of crocodiles, agamids, other monitor lizards, and birds), invertebrates (such as beetles, termites, orthopterans, crabs, caterpillars, spiders, millipedes, earthworms, snails, and slugs), carrion, human wastes, and feces.

== Distribution and habitat ==
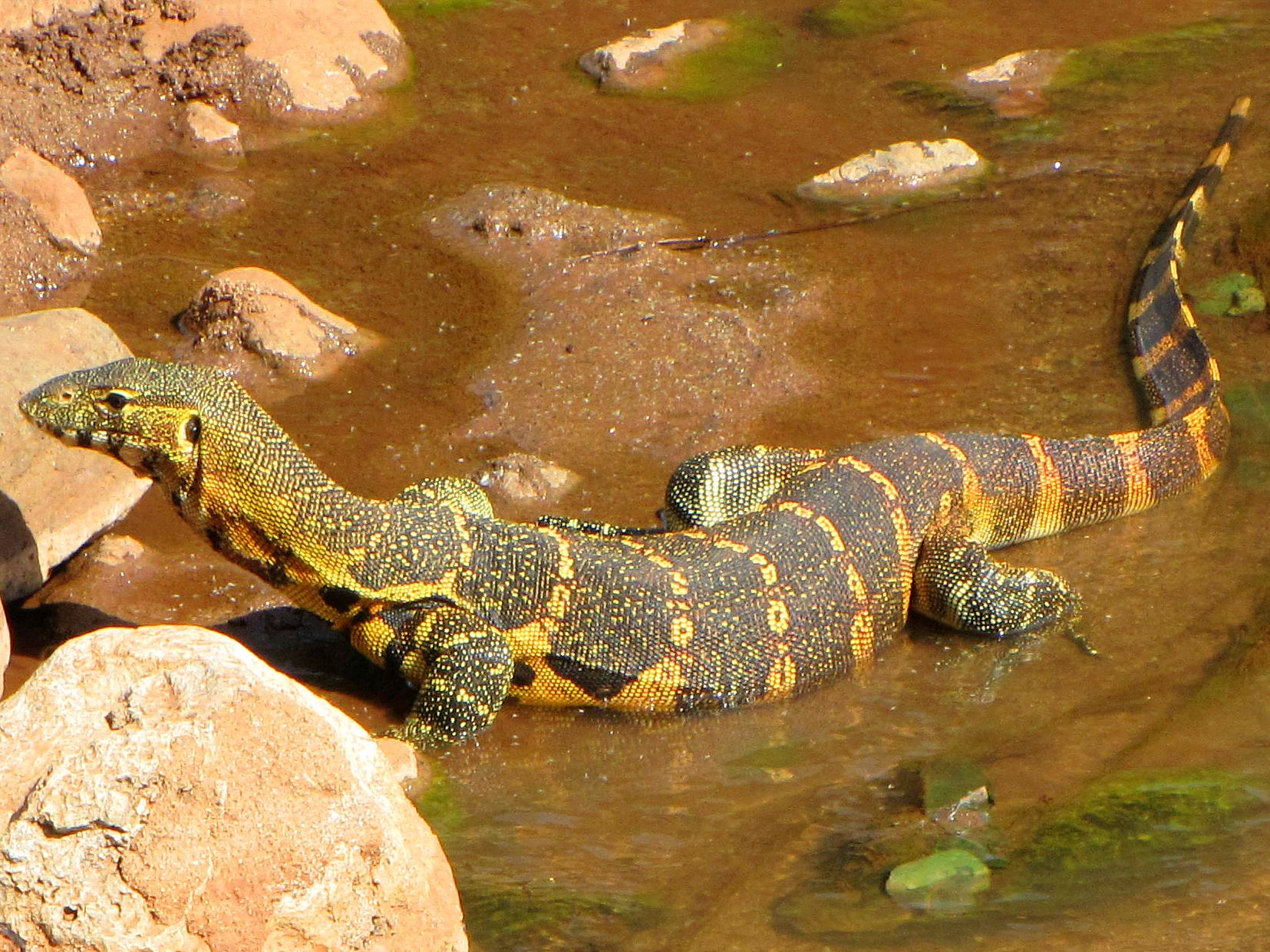
Lake Manyara National Park, Tanzania

Nile monitors are native to Sub-Saharan Africa and along the Nile. They are not found in any of the desert regions of Africa (notably Sahara, Kalahari and much of the Horn of Africa), however, they thrive around rivers. Nile monitors were reported to live in and around the Jordan River, Dead Sea, and wadis of the Judaean Desert in Israel until the late 19th century, though they are now extinct in the region.

=== Invasive species ===
In Florida in the United States, established breeding populations of Nile monitors have been known to exist in different parts of the state since at least 1990. Genetic studies have shown that these introduced animals are part of the subpopulation that originates from West Africa, and now often is recognized as its own species, the West African Nile monitor. The vast majority of the established breeding population is in Lee County, particularly in the Cape Coral and surrounding regions, including the nearby barrier islands (Sanibel, Captiva, and North Captiva), Pine Island, Fort Myers, and Punta Rassa. Established populations also exist in adjacent Charlotte County, especially on Gasparilla Island. Other areas in Florida with a sizeable number of Nile monitor sightings include Palm Beach County just southwest of West Palm Beach along State Road 80. In July 2008, a Nile monitor was spotted in Homestead, a small city southwest of Miami. Other sightings have been reported near Hollywood, Naranja, and as far south as Key Largo in the Florida Keys. The potential for the established population of Nile monitors in Lee, Charlotte, and other counties in Florida, to negatively impact indigenous crocodilians, such as American alligators (Alligator mississippiensis), and American crocodiles (Crocodylus acutus), is enormous, given that they normally raid crocodile nests, eat eggs, and prey on small crocodiles in Africa. Anecdotal evidence indicates a high rate of disappearance of domestic pets and feral cats in Cape Coral.

== In captivity ==
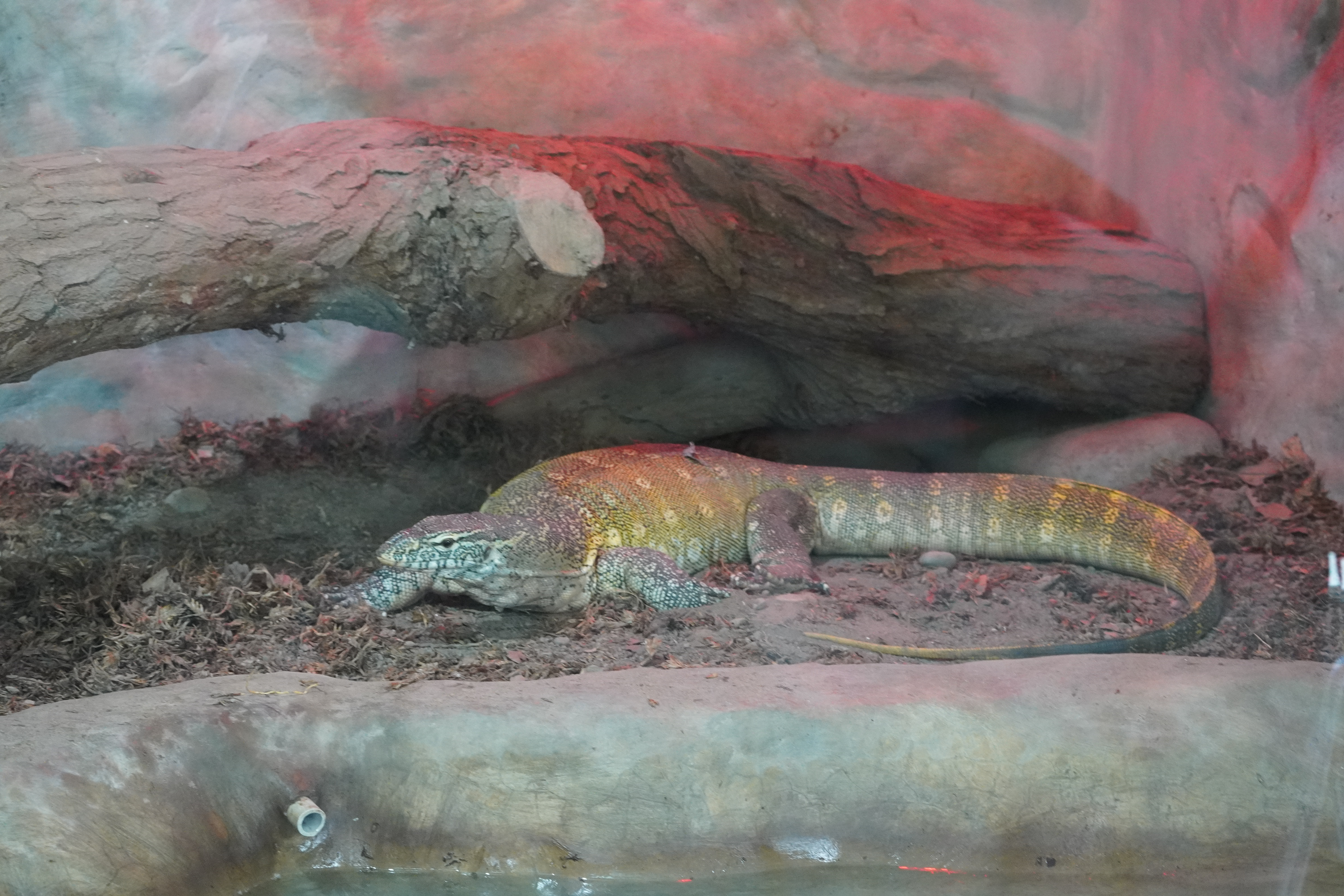
Captive specimen from the Parque de las Leyendas zoo, 2024

Nile monitors are often found in the pet trade despite their highly aggressive demeanor and resistance to taming. Juvenile monitors will tail whip as a defensive measure, and as adults, they are capable of inflicting moderate to serious wounds from biting and scratching. Nile monitors require a large cage as juveniles quickly grow when fed a varied diet, and large adults often require custom-built quarters.

There are few lizards less suited to life in captivity than the Nile monitor. Buffrenil (1992) considered that, when fighting for its life, a Nile monitor was a more dangerous adversary than a crocodile of a similar size. Their care presents particular problems on account of the lizards' enormous size and lively dispositions. Very few of the people who buy brightly-coloured baby Nile monitors can be aware that, within a couple of years, their purchase will have turned into an enormous, ferocious carnivore, quite capable of breaking the family cat's neck with a single snap and swallowing it whole.
