= Al Areen Wildlife Park =

Mohamed bin Zayed Nature Reserve
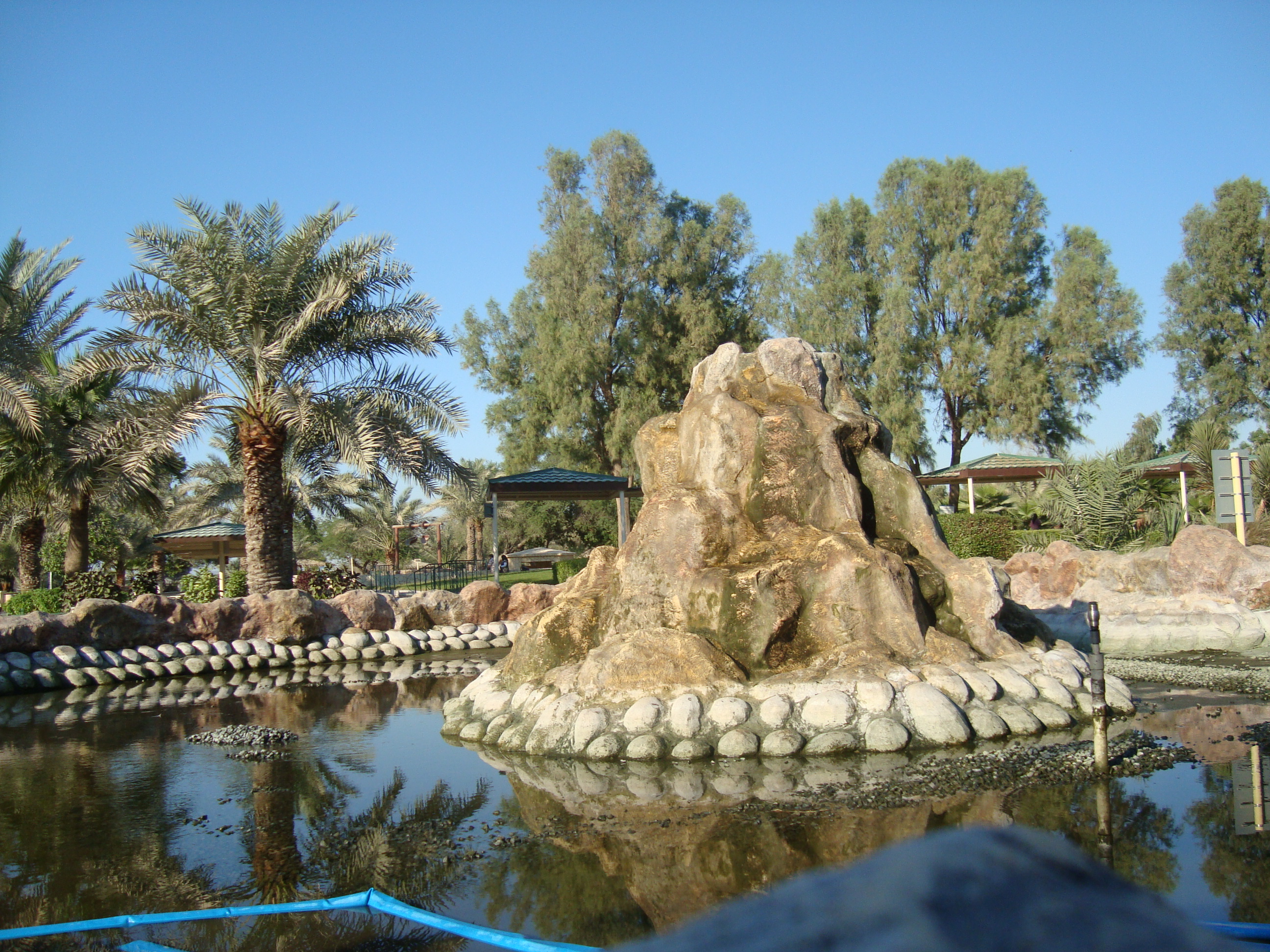
- Artificial pond in the park
- Interactive map of Mohamed bin Zayed Nature Reserve
- 26°00′56″N 50°29′44″E
- Date opened: 1976
- Location: Sakhir, Bahrain
- Land area: 7 km^{2} (2.7 sq mi)
- No. of species: 50 (2017)
- Annual visitors: 323,286 (2017)
- Website: Al Areen Official Website

Mohamed bin Zayed Nature Reserve (Arabic: محمية محمد بن زايد الطبيعية; transliterated: Mohamed bin Zayed NatureReserve) is a nature reserve and zoo, located in Sakhir, Bahrain. It is one of five protected areas of Bahrain and its the only designated protected area on land.

== History and profile ==
The reserve covers a total area of 7 km sq and was first established in 1976. Species native to Bahrain, both plants and animals, as well as species originating from Africa, and South Asia are present in the zoological park. In 2013, the park attracted 199,235 visitors.

As of 1999, the park was attached to the ministry of cabinet affairs and information.

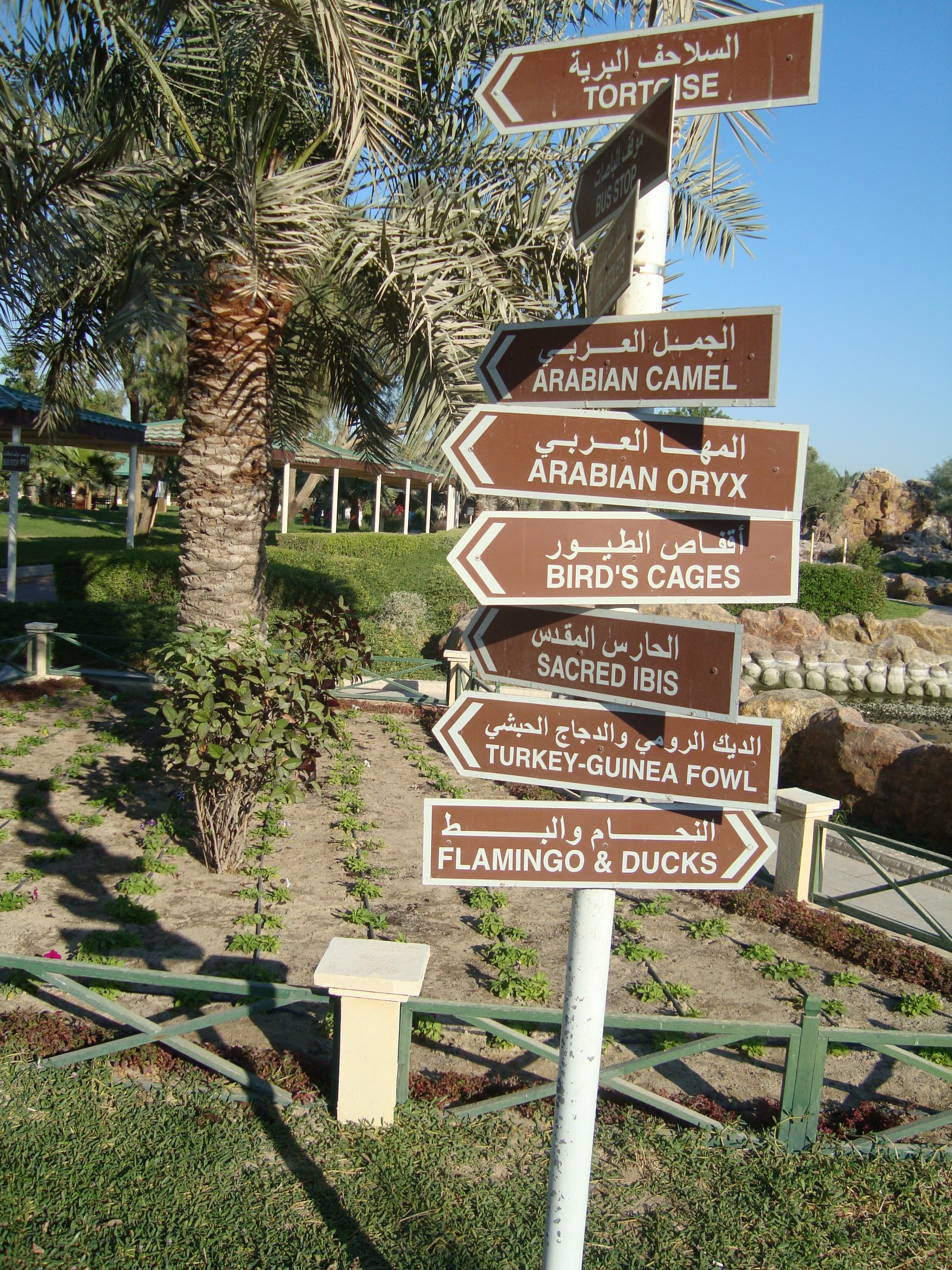
Directions in the reserve

== Attractions ==
The reserve features 100,000 planted flora and trees, & more than 45 species of animals, 82 species of birds and 25 species of flora. Species that roam the nature reserve section of the park include the Arabian oryx, which is extinct in the wild, South African cheetah, lion, Savannah monitor, African rock python, Persian gazelle, springbok, African wild dog, Spotted hyena, saluki dogs, impala, fallow deer, Chapman's zebra, Honey badger and desert hares. Arabian and North African species such as the scimitar-horned oryx, addax (which is rare in the wild), dama gazelle, giraffes, Nubian ibex, wild goat, barbary sheep and Asiatic onager are also present. The park also employs a captive breeding policy of endangered species.

The reserve area covers a total area of 800 hectares, divided into two 400-hectares sections; one section dedicated to the public while the other section is a protected reserve, equipped with two surface reservoirs for flora and fauna. The park has undergone multiple renovations in the previous decade, adding an aviary and an Arabian wild animals complex. A falcon stadium and petting zoo was opened in 2014 under the sponsorship of Viva Bahrain.

== Access ==
The reserve is restricted, except for specialists, researchers, veterinarians and the animals’ keepers. Entrance to the reserve area of the park is prohibited unless prior permission is obtained. Public access to the reserve's animals is provided by tour-buses from the main entrance. The park itself is a 40-minute drive from Manama, connected by a highway, and is located adjacent to Bahrain International Circuit.
