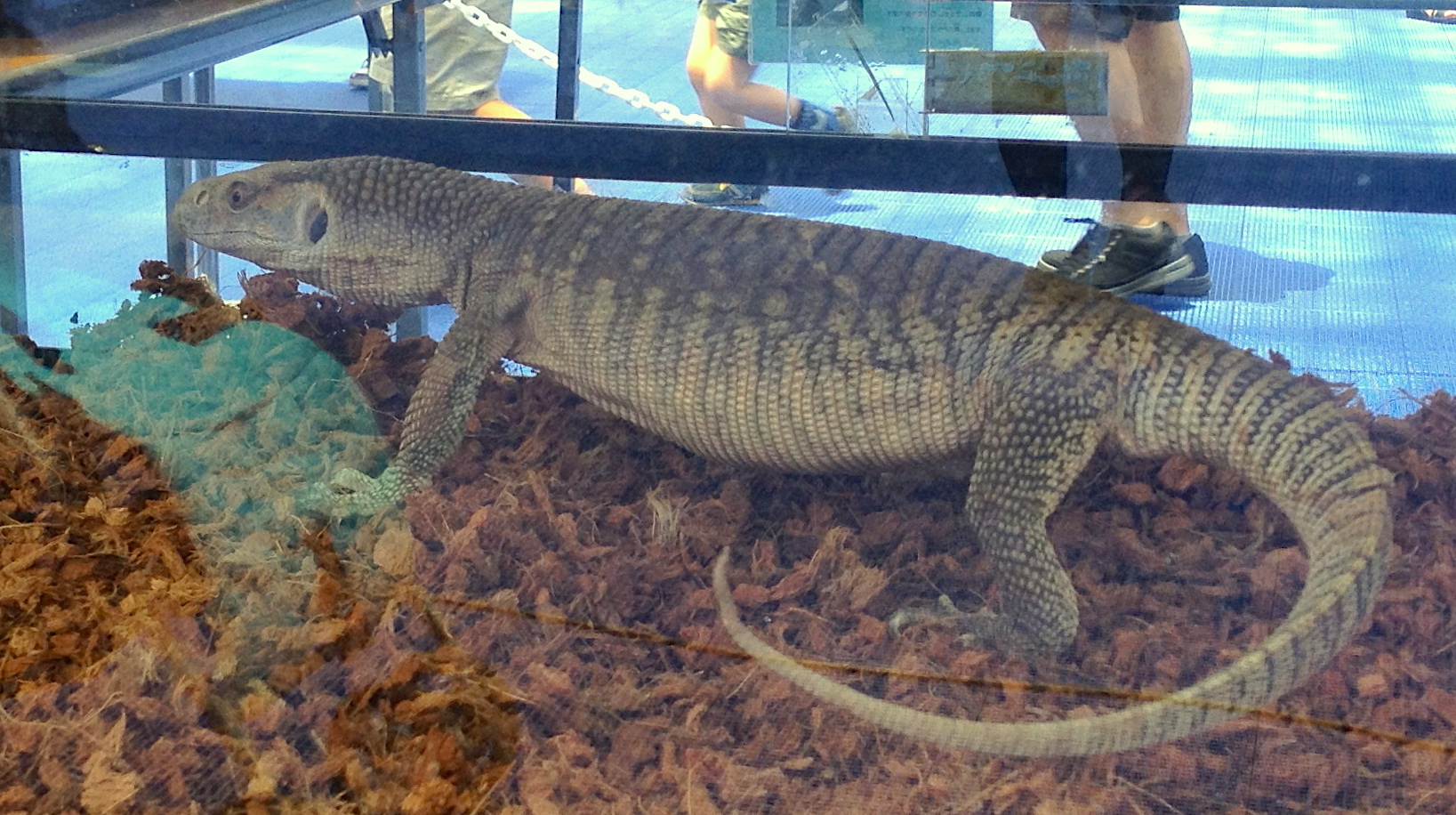
- Adult in captivity
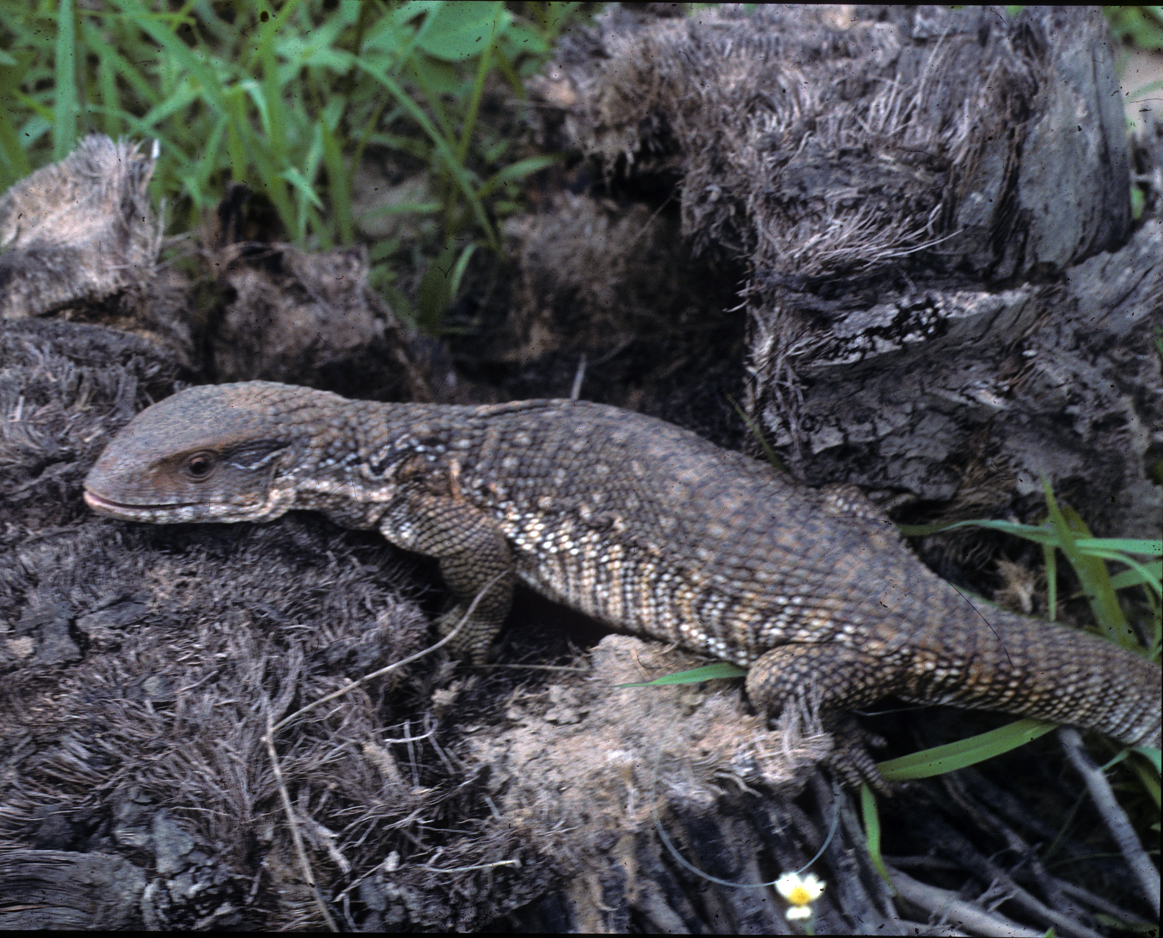
- Wild individual

Conservation status
- Least Concern (IUCN 3.1)
- CITES Appendix II

Scientific classification
- Kingdom: Animalia
- Phylum: Chordata
- Class: Reptilia
- Order: Squamata
- Suborder: Anguimorpha
- Family: Varanidae
- Genus: Varanus
- Subgenus: Polydaedalus
- Species: V. exanthematicus

Binomial name
- Varanus exanthematicus (Bosc, 1792)

= Savannah monitor =

Species of lizard

The savannah monitor (Varanus exanthematicus) is a medium-sized species of monitor lizard native to Africa. The species is known as Bosc's monitor in Europe, since French scientist Louis Bosc first described the species. It belongs to the subgenus Polydaedalus.

== Etymology ==
The specific name exanthematicus is derived from the Greek word ἐξάνθημα exanthēma, meaning an eruption or blister of the skin. French botanist and zoologist Louis Augustin Guillaume Bosc originally described this lizard as Lacerta exanthematica in reference to the large oval scales on the back of its neck.

The species was formerly known as Lacerta exanthematicus.

== Description ==
Savannah monitors are stoutly built, with relatively short limbs and toes, and skulls and dentition adapted to feed on hard-shelled prey. They are robust creatures, with powerful limbs for digging, powerful jaws and blunt, peglike teeth. Maximum size is rarely more than 100 cm. The skin coloration pattern varies according to the local habitat substrate. The body scales are large, usually less than 100 scales around midbody, a partly laterally compressed tail with a double dorsal ridge and nostrils equidistant from the eyes and the tip of the snout.

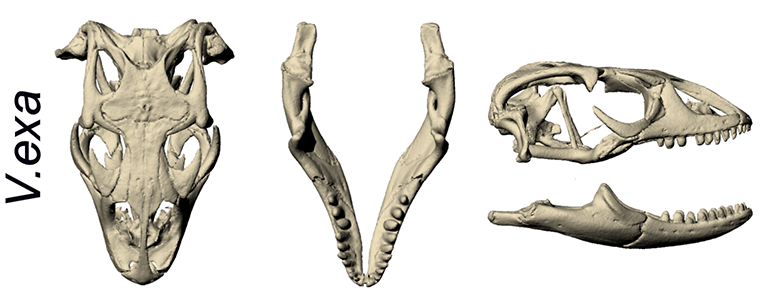
Skull

Teeth are replaced around every 109 days.

The savannah monitor is often confused with the white-throat monitor (Varanus albigularis), which can grow to lengths of 5–6 ft. While similar in overall appearance, this species possesses significant morphological and ecological differences and is recognized as a very distinct species.

== Behaviour ==
=== Diet ===
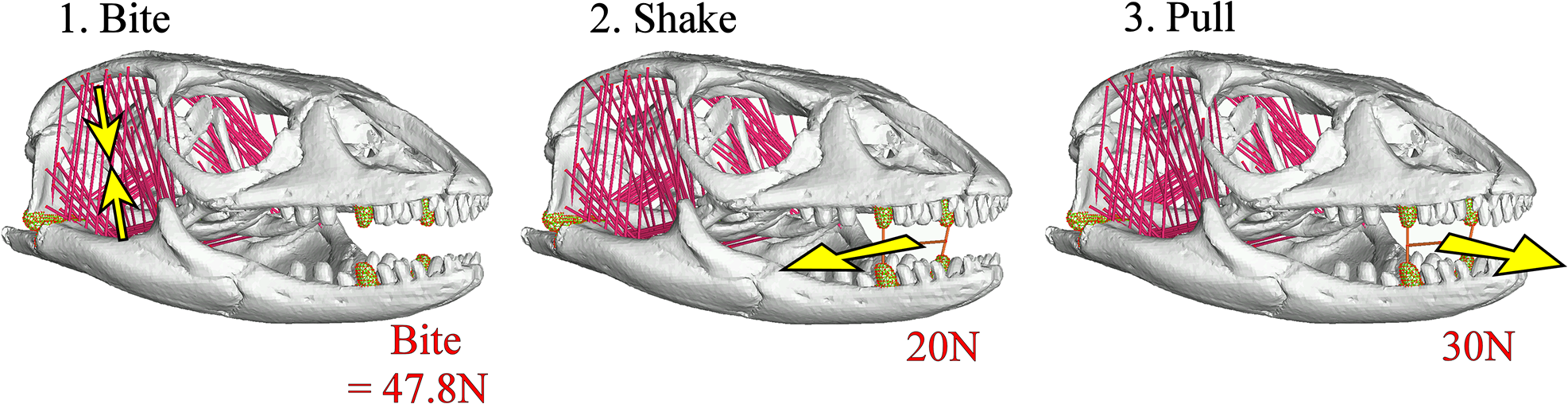
Graph showing bite force of the savannah monitor while feeding

Their diet is much more restricted than that of other African monitor lizards, consisting mainly of snails, crabs, scorpions, millipedes, centipedes, orthopterans, mantids, hymenopterans, lepidopterans, beetles and other invertebrates, as well as frogs. Information about the diet of savannah monitors in the wild has been recorded in Senegal and Ghana. It feeds almost exclusively on arthropods and molluscs. In Senegal, Julus millipedes were the most common prey of adults; in Ghana, small crickets formed the bulk of the diet of animals less than 2 months old; orthopterans (especially Brachytrupes), scorpions and amphibians were the most common prey of animals 6–7 months old. Many adults also consume large quantities of snails. Full grown V. exanthematicus have teeth that are quite blunt to help them crack and eat snails. The jaw has evolved to put maximum leverage at the back of the jaw to crush snail shells. Adults will also eat carrion if they come across it. Wild savannah monitors are also known to occasionally eat lizard eggs (such as those of agamids and their own kind).

=== Reproduction ===
Females dig a deep hole in the substrate, in which up to 40 or more eggs are laid, which hatch after about 156–160 days. Hatchlings start feeding a few days after the yolk sac has been absorbed, which may take 12 days or more after hatching.

== In captivity ==
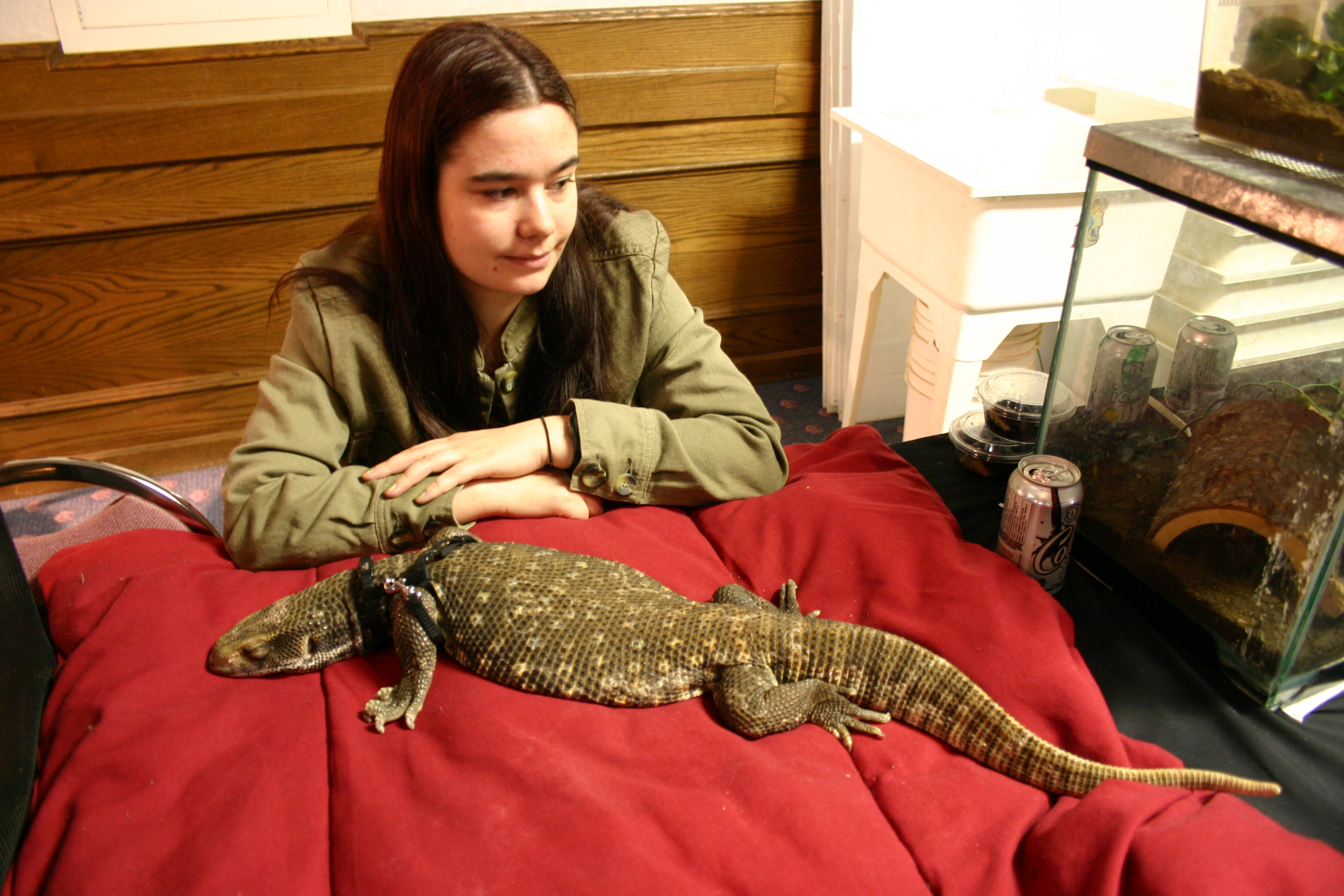
Captive savannah monitor, wearing a reptile harness

The savannah monitor is the most common monitor lizard species available in the pet trade, accounting for almost half (48.0552%) of the entire international trade in live monitor lizards. Despite its prevalence in global pet trade, successful captive reproduction is very rare, and a high mortality rate is associated with the species. Adult specimens frequently become unwanted pets and are reported as being the most common monitor lizards by animal rescue agencies. The skins are traded within the international leather trade and originate mainly from Chad, Mali and Sudan.

== Range ==
Its range extends throughout sub-Saharan Africa from Senegal east to Sudan and south almost to the Congo River and Rift Valley, where they are replaced by V. albigularis. V. exanthematicus is primarily a ground-dwelling species that shelters in burrows, although it is sometimes found in bushes or low trees. In the coastal plain of Ghana, V. exanthematicus juveniles are often associated with the burrows of the giant cricket Brachytrupes.

== Threats ==
V. exanthematicus is listed as least concern by IUCN. The species is hunted for its leather, meat, and for the international pet trade. The trade in wild collected savannah monitors is not of a global conservation concern, due to the vast range of the species; in addition to the collection for the pet trade often occurring over a relatively small area. An average of 30,574 live specimens were imported into the US each year, between 2000 and 2009; total imports of live specimens into the US between 2000 and 2010 was 325,480 animals. During the same period, 1,037 skins, shoes, and products of the species were imported into the US. Trade in live animals comes mainly from Ghana (235,903 animals exported between 2000 and 2010), Togo (188,110 animals exported between 2000 and 2010), and Benin (72,964 animals exported between 2000 and 2010). During the same period, total worldwide declared exports of skins and products of the species totalled 37,506. However, substantial undeclared trade in the species occurs from Sudan, Nigeria, and elsewhere. Within several West African nations, roadside diners and food stands specialize in "monitor stew", a hot simmered dish of local vegetables and savannah monitor; it is unclear whether the cooked lizards are hunted or bred specifically for human consumption, or at what rate they are being killed for this purpose.
