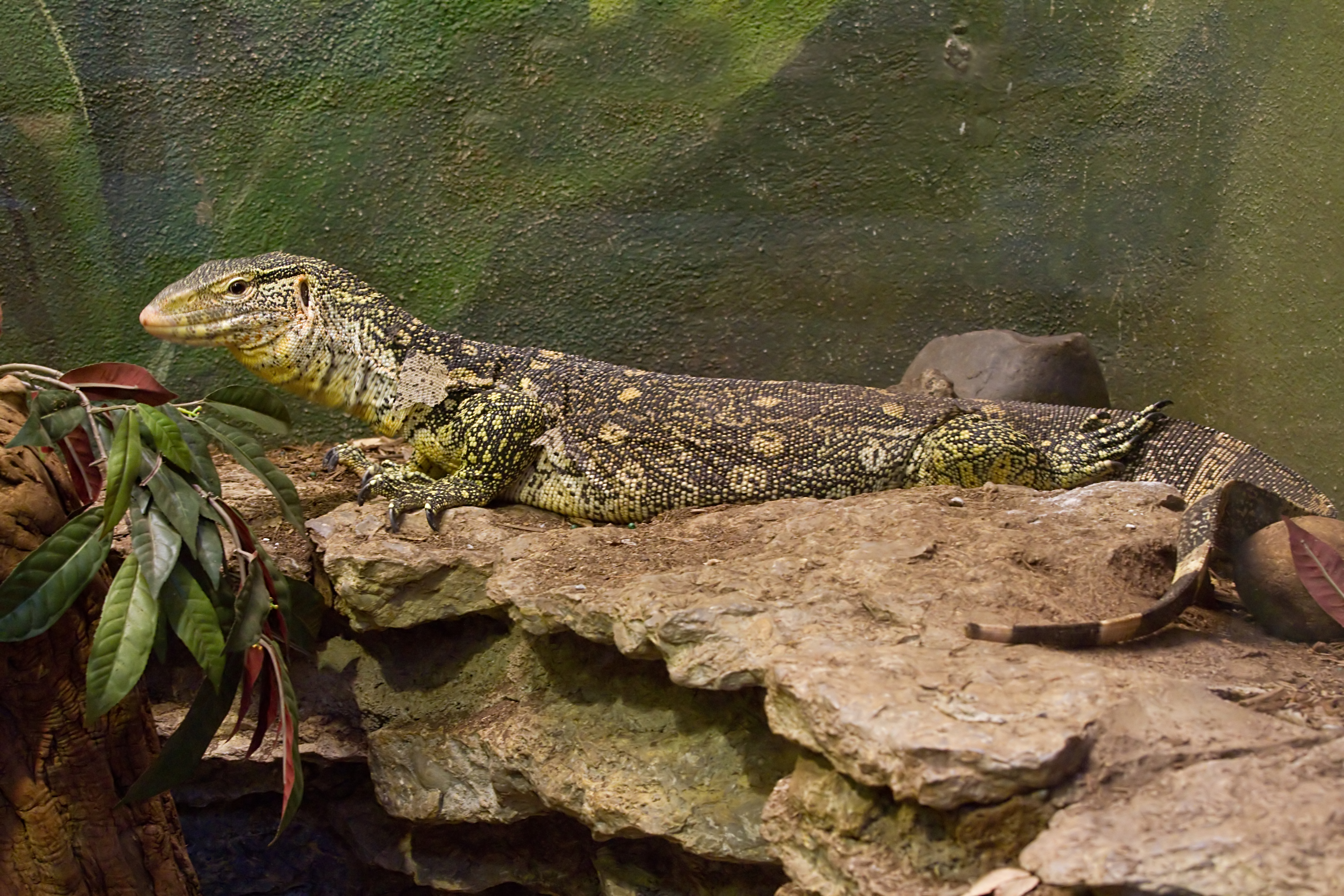

Scientific classification (disputed)
- Kingdom: Animalia
- Phylum: Chordata
- Class: Reptilia
- Order: Squamata
- Suborder: Anguimorpha
- Family: Varanidae
- Genus: Varanus
- Species: V. niloticus
- Subspecies: V. n. ornatus

Trinomial name
- Varanus niloticus ornatus (Daudin, 1803)

= Ornate monitor =

Species of lizard

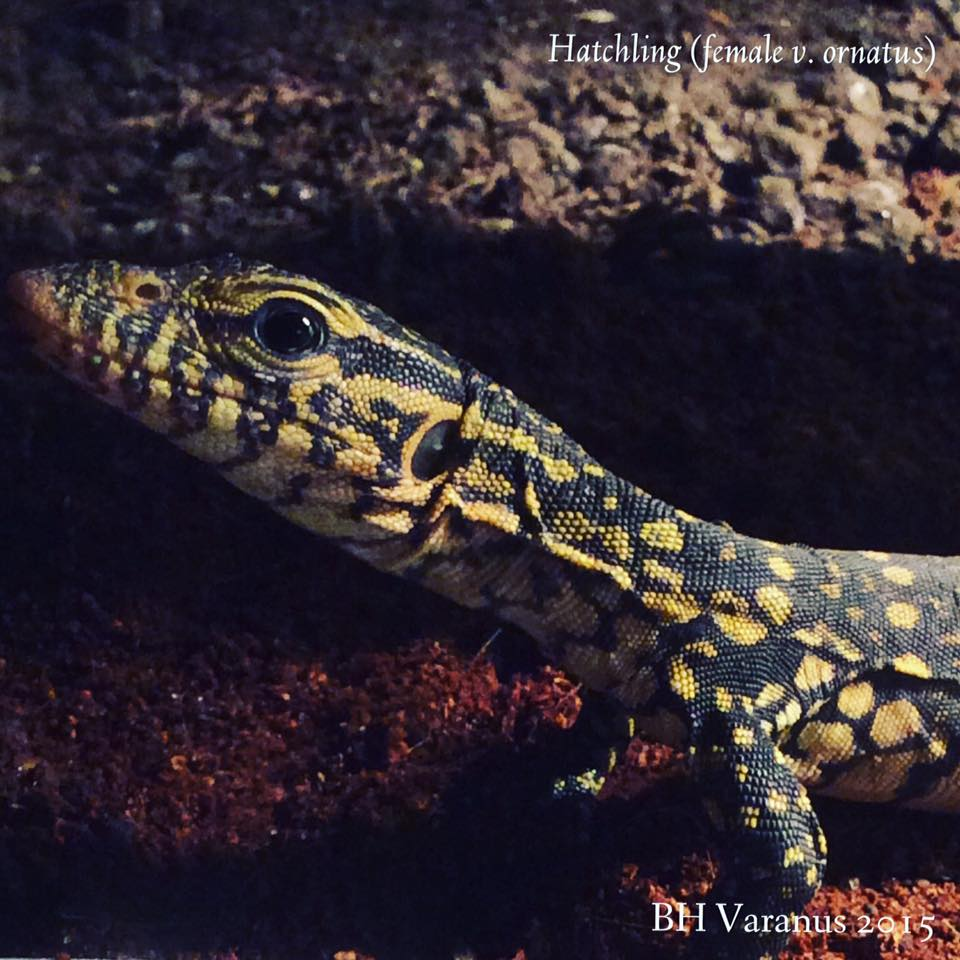
Hatchling

The ornate monitor (Varanus niloticus ornatus) is a monitor lizard that is native to West and Middle Africa. Comprehensive molecular analyses of the group have demonstrated that animals previously assigned to "Varanus ornatus" do not constitute a valid taxon and are actually polymorphisms of two different species; Varanus stellatus (west African Nile monitor) and Varanus niloticus (Nile monitor). Consequently, Varanus ornatus is considered a synonym of Varanus niloticus and "ornate monitor" is an informal term for forest forms of either species (V. niloticus or V. stellatus). Until 1997, the ornate monitor was considered a subspecies of the Nile monitor. It was subsequently described as a separate species on the basis of reduced number of ocelli rows on the body, a light coloured tongue and a more massive build. More recent work based on a large sample size using mitochondrial and nuclear DNA sequences indicates that Varanus ornatus is not a valid species and that animals with the diagnostic appearance belong to either of two sister species of Nile monitor. Animals described as ornate monitor lizards are native to closed canopy forests in West and Middle Africa.

== Description ==
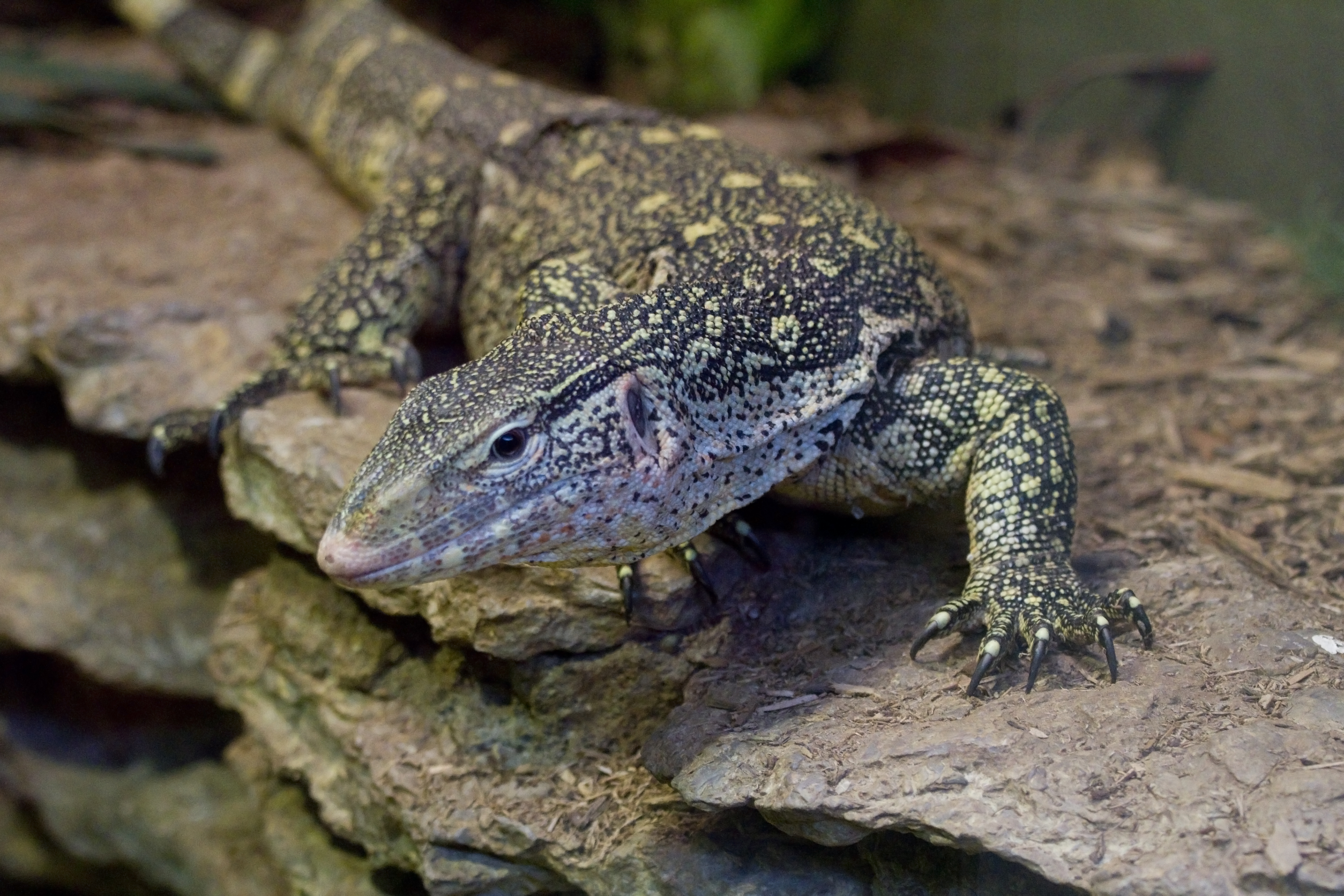
Detail of head and claws

The back is dark – olive green to black – with cross bands of yellow or cream color ocelli plus additional bands on the tail. The ventral side is yellowish with gray banding. The number of ocelli bands on the body, four, or five, was supposed to distinguish V. ornatus from V. niloticus, which has from six to nine. The markings fade somewhat as the animal matures. Ornate monitors are quite large and can grow up to two metres in length.

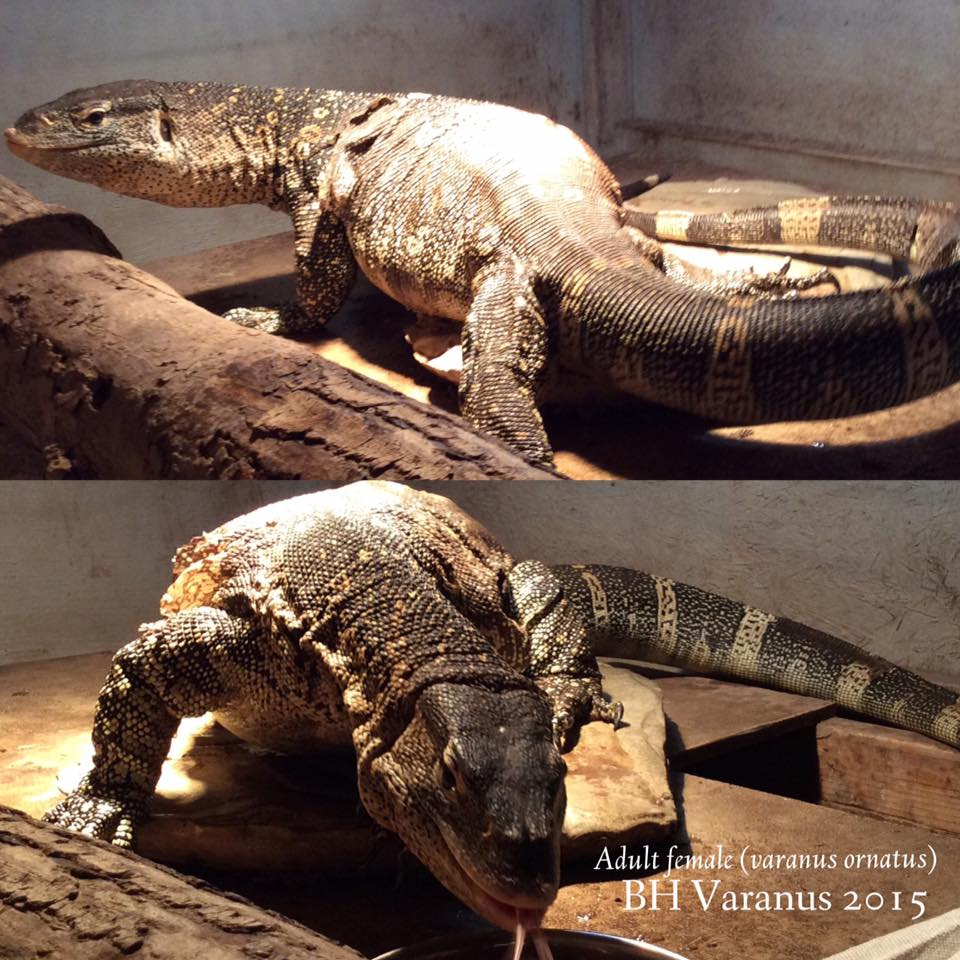
Adult female ornate monitor (V. ornatus)
