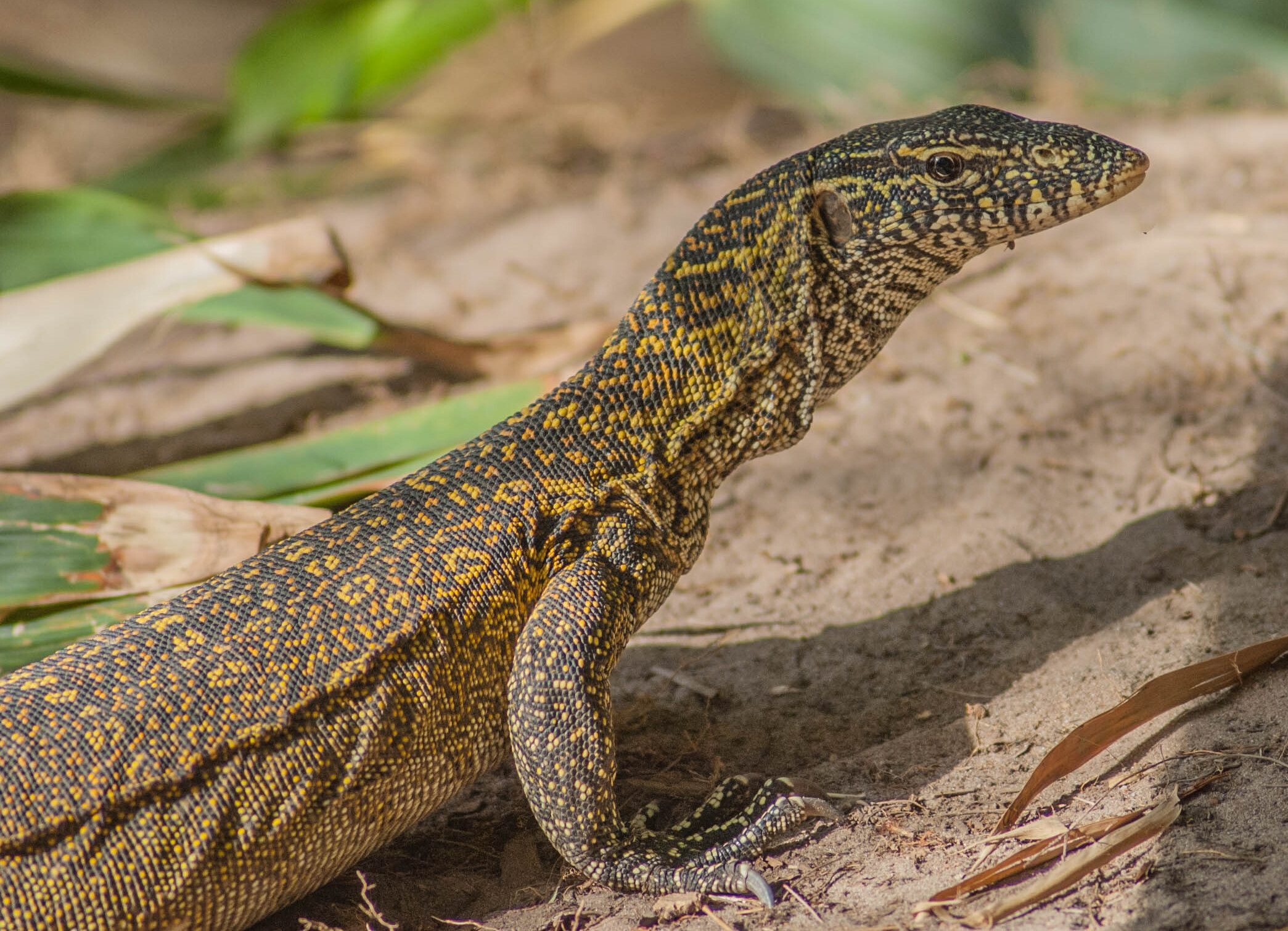

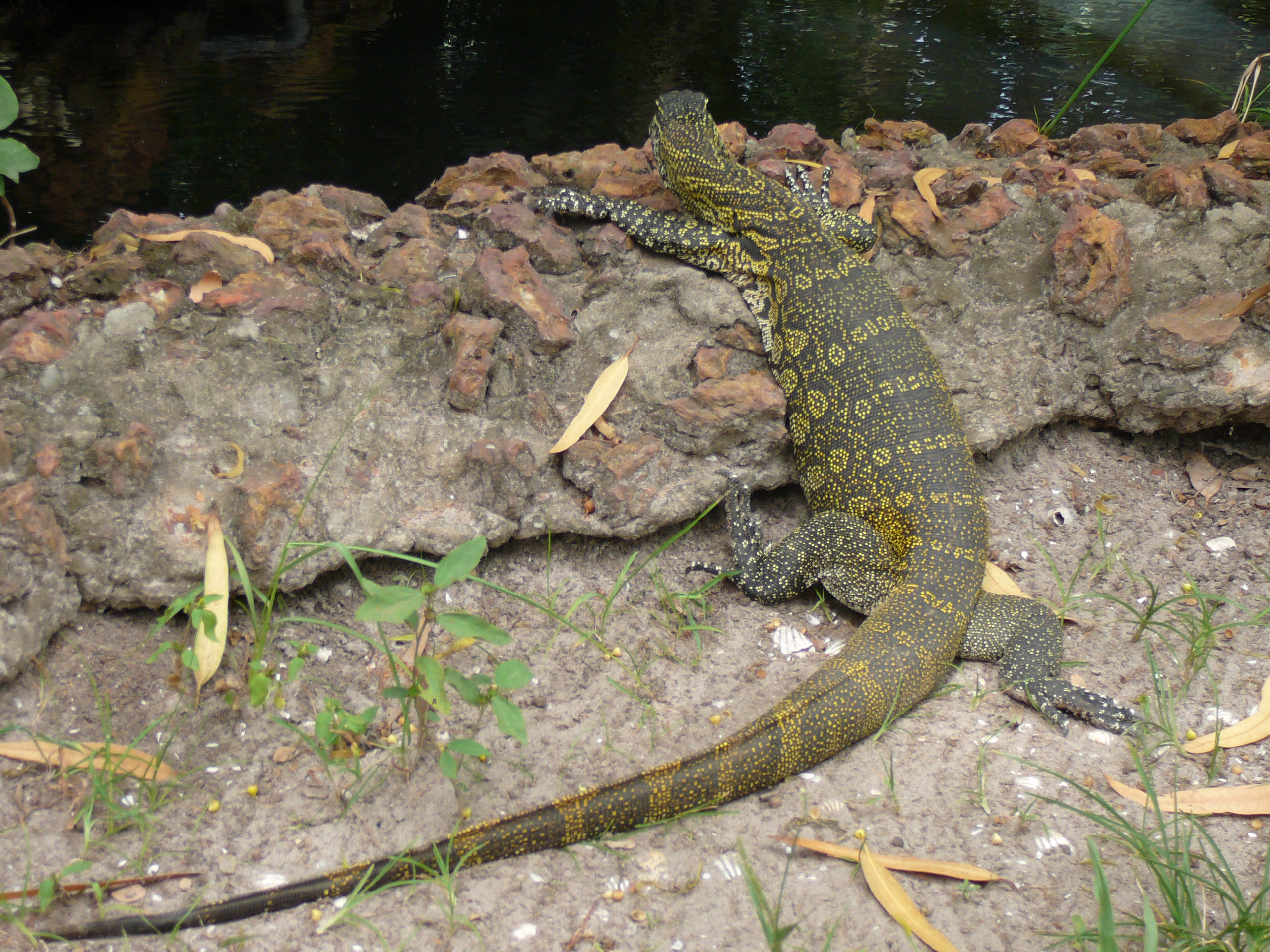
- Two individuals in Gambia, which based on location are West African Nile monitors

Scientific classification
- Kingdom: Animalia
- Phylum: Chordata
- Class: Reptilia
- Order: Squamata
- Suborder: Anguimorpha
- Family: Varanidae
- Genus: Varanus
- Species: V. niloticus
- Subspecies: V. n. stellatus

Trinomial name
- Varanus niloticus stellatus (Daudin, 1802)

= West African Nile monitor =

Species of reptile

The West African Nile monitor (Varanus niloticus stellatus) is a subspecies of the Nile monitor that is native to West African forests and adjacent savannah (east to northern Cameroon). It has also been introduced to Florida, United States, where it is considered invasive.

Female Nile monitors typically reach sexual maturity at approximately two years of age or when they grow to around 14 inches in length. They lay eggs in burrows, with clutch sizes ranging from 12 to 60 eggs, depending on the female's size. Males compete aggressively for mating opportunities, often engaging in wrestling behavior. In captivity, Nile monitors may live up to 20 years. As the largest lizard species native to Africa, individuals can reach lengths of up to 6.5 feet and weigh as much as 17.8 pounds, though most adults average around 5 feet in length and 15 pounds in weight.

This cryptic species has traditionally been included in the Nile monitor (V. niloticus), but from 1997 to 2015 it was often considered as the western population of the ornate monitor (V. ornatus). Compared to the other members of the Nile monitor species complex (which also includes the ornate monitor of Central Africa), the West African Nile monitor has a genetic sequence divergence of more than 8%, meaning that they separated about 7.7 million years ago. This is a larger divergence than between humans and chimpanzees. Despite this, the Reptile Database continues to place it within the Nile monitor, but do note that this broad species definition includes distinctive clades.
