= Zallaq =

- Location in Bahrain
- Coordinates: 26°03′N 50°29′E
- Country: Bahrain
- Governorate: Southern Governorate
- Settled: 19th century
- Elevation: 16 ft (4.9 m)

Zallaq (Arabic: الزلاق) is a village on the western coast of Bahrain. Zallaq was the home to the Al-Dawasir, Al-Zeabi and Al-Gahtam and Al-Seddiqi tribes in Bahrain together with Budaiya and Hawar Islands. It is famous for the Jazaer Beach (also known as Zallaq Beach). The Al Areen Wildlife Park is also near the Jazaer Beach in Zallaq. The village has many fishing boats. From 1938 to 1945 the Bahrain Petroleum Company operated an oil shipment terminal near Zellaq.

== See also ==
- Bahrain
