= Sadad, Bahrain =

Village in Northern Governorate, Bahrain

Coordinates: 26°05′N 50°29′E

Sadad is a coastal village situated on the western shore of Bahrain. It is situated to the south of Malkiya and to the west of Hamad Town, in the Northern Governorate administrative region of the country.

During the Bahrain uprising, the village was a hotspot for clashes between police and anti−government protesters.

The new development of the area made sadad more like a town.But Sadad is still a village due the population estimated:2500-3000
