= Shahrakan =

Village in Northern Governorate, Bahrain

Coordinates: 26.076°N 50.500°E

Shahrakan is a village situated in the western side of the Kingdom of Bahrain, south of the village of Malkiya. The village lies in the Northern Governorate administrative region. It has a population of approximately 3,000 people.

The village was a site of unrest during the Bahrain uprising.
