= Enthoven =

Enthoven is a surname. Notable people with the surname include:

- Alain Enthoven (born 1930), American economist
- Dick Enthoven (1937–2022), South African billionaire businessman
- Gabrielle Enthoven (1868–1950), English playwright and actress
- Geoffrey Enthoven, Belgian film director
- Henry Enthoven (1855–?), English rugby player
- Marie Enthoven, filmmaker, cousin of Geoffrey Enthoven
- Patrick Enthoven (born 1943/44), South African businessman
- Jean-Paul Enthoven (born 1949), French journalist, father of Raphaël
- Raphaël Enthoven (born 1975), French philosopher
- Reginald Edward Enthoven (1869–1952), British administrator in India
- Robby Enthoven (born 1968), South African businessman
- Sam Enthoven (born 1974), English children's author
- Tommy Enthoven (1903–1975), English cricket player
