= List of educational institutions in Bahrain =

This is a list of educational institutions located in the Asian country of Bahrain.

== Primary and secondary education ==
The following primary schools and secondary schools are both national and international schools.

School name	Location	Official website
American School of Bahrain	Riffa	Official Website
Nadeen School	Dilmunia, Amwaj	Official Website
Noor Al Diyar Private School	Diyar Al Muharraq	Official Website
Palms School	Riffa	Official Website
Happy Hearts Kindergarten	Sanad	Official Website
EtonHouse International Pre-School Bahrain	Janabiyah	Official Website
Al Shorooq International Preschool	East Riffa	Official Website
1st Steps Children's Nursery	Isa Town	Official Website
Abdul Rahman Kanoo International School	Salmabad	Official Website
Al Rawabi Private School	Jabalat Habashi	Official Website
Al Hekma International School	Isa Town	Official Website
Al-Hidaya Al-Khalifia Secondary School	Busaiteen	N/A
Al Iman School	Isa Town	Official Website
Al Noor International School	Sitra	Official Website
Al Mahd Day Boarding School	Saar	Official Website
Al Raja School	Manama	Official Website
Al Wisam International School	Shakhura	Official Website
University of technology Bahrain	Salmabad	Official Website
Arabian Pearl Gulf School	Manama	Official Website
The Asian School Bahrain	Tubli	Official Website
Awali School	Awali	N/A
Bahrain Bayan School	Isa Town	Official Website
Bahrain Elementary School	Manama	
Bahrain Indian School	Budaiya	Official Website
Bahrain School	Juffair	Official Website
Bangladesh School	Adliya	Official Website
Beacon Private School	Al Hidd	Official Website
British School of Bahrain	Hamala	Official Website
Canadian School Bahrain	Muharraq	Official Website
Capital School	Zinj	Official Website
Hawar International School	Riffa	Official Website
Ibn Al Hytham Islamic School	Manama	Official Website
Ibn Khuldoon National School	Isa Town	Official Website
Indian School, Bahrain	Isa Town	Official Website
The Japanese School in Bahrain	Sar	Official website
Lycée Français MLF de Bahreïn	Muharraq	Official Website
Modern Knowledge Schools	Juffair	Official Website
Multinational School Bahrain	Adliya	Official Website
Middle East school	Salihiya	Officialwebsite
Naseem International School	Isa Town	Official Website
New Horizons School	Zinj	Official Website
New Millennium School	Zinj	Official Website
Novotech Group	The Bahrain Mall, Seef	Official Website
Pakistan School, Bahrain	Isa Town	Official Website
Pakistan Urdu School, Bahrain	Isa Town	Official Website
Philippine School Bahrain	Isa Town	Official Website
Quality Education School, Bahrain	Budaiya	Official Website
Riffa Views International School	Riffa	Official Website
Sacred Heart School	Isa Town	Official Website
Shaikha Hessa Girls School Bahrain	Riffa	Official Website
St. Christopher's School Bahrain	Isa Town and Saar	Official Website
Talent International and the Infant School	Manama	Official Website
The Eastern School, Bahrain	Adliya	Official Website
The New Indian School	Isa Town	Official Website

== See also ==
- Education in Bahrain
- Lists of museums
- Lists of schools
