= Nando's =

South African flame-grilled chicken chain

Nando's Ltd

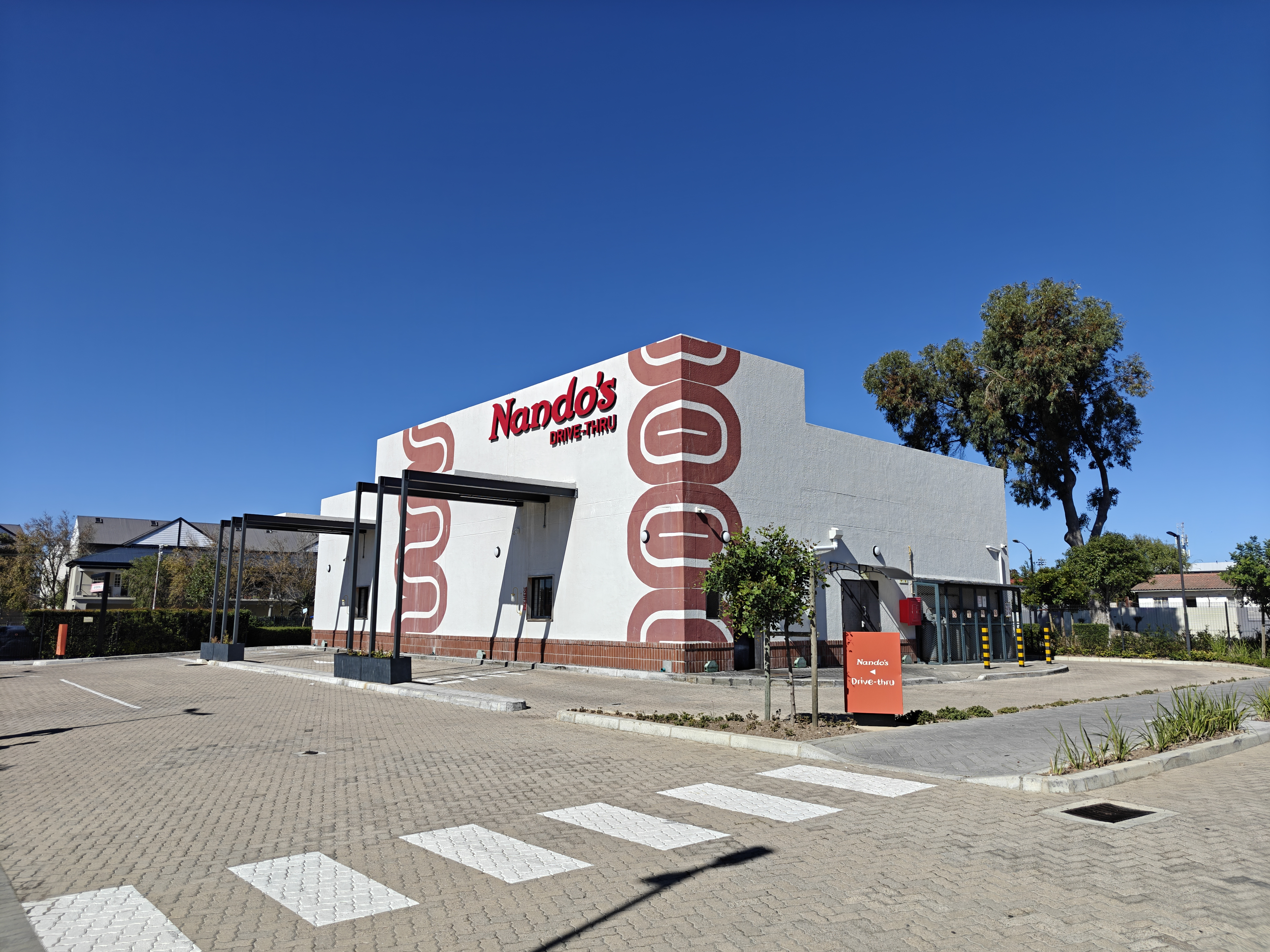
- A Nando's restaurant and drive-thru at the 3Arts Village shopping centre in Plumstead, Cape Town
- Type: Private
- Industry: Fast casual dining Chain restaurant
- Genre: Flame-grilled chicken
- Founded: 1987; 39 years ago, Johannesburg, Gauteng, South Africa
- Founder: Fernando Duarte and Robert Brozin
- Headquarters: Johannesburg, South Africa
- Number of locations: 1,200+ (2020)
- Area served: Global (30 countries)
- Key people: Enthoven family (owners)
- Products: Chicken and other cuisine
- Website: nandos.com

Nando's (/ˈnændoʊz/; Afrikaans: [ˈnandœs]) is a South African multinational fast casual restaurant chain that specialises in Portuguese flame-grilled, peri-peri style chicken. (Note: On its website, Nando's styles "peri-peri" as "PERi-PERi".) The name is derived from a nickname for the male given name Fernando, in reference to one of the company's founders.

Founded in Johannesburg in 1987, Nando's operates over 1,200 outlets in 30 countries. Their logo depicts the Rooster of Barcelos, one of Portugal's most common symbols. The company was wholly owned by Dick Enthoven until his death in 2022, and is now owned by his family.

== History ==
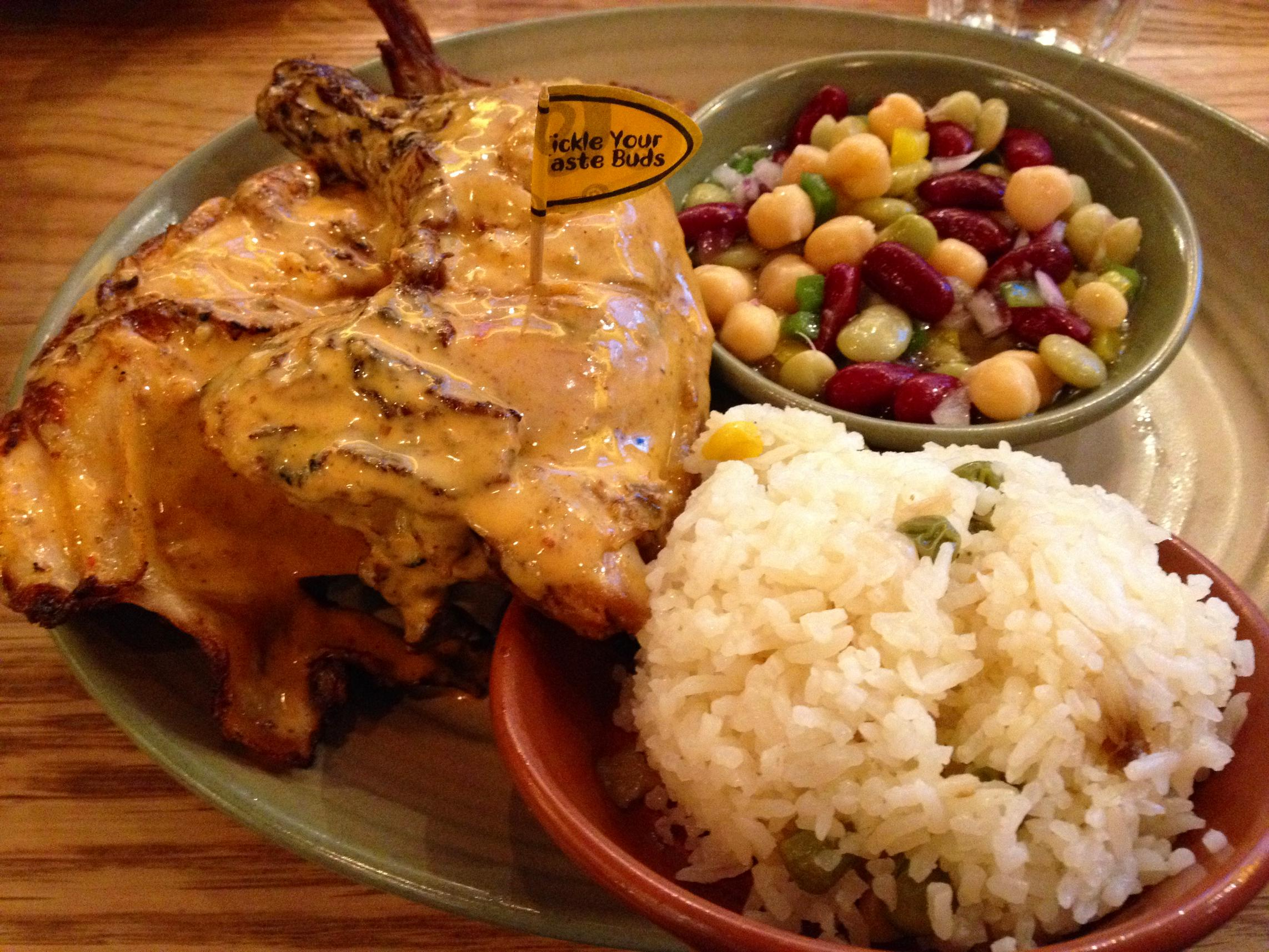
A meal at Nando's featuring flame-grilled peri peri chicken

The restaurant was founded in 1987 in Rosettenville, Johannesburg by Portuguese-born Fernando Duarte and South African-born Robert Brozin. Upon visiting a Portuguese Mozambican takeaway named Chickenland and trying the chicken with peri peri, they bought the restaurant for about 80,000 rand (equivalent to about £25,000 at the time). They renamed the restaurant Nando's after Fernando's firstborn son.

By 1989, the restaurant had three outlets in Johannesburg and one in Portugal. Capricorn Ventures International acquired the chain in 1992. In that year, the first branch opened up in Ealing Common where once stood a branch of Midland Bank.

In 2010, Advertising Age magazine named Nando's one of the world's top 30 hottest marketing brands alongside Tata Nano, MTN and Natura. During the same year, the success of Nando's in the U.K. led The Guardian to write that Nando's was a modern restaurant brand that had "changed the face of British fast food." Nando's 1,000th store worldwide opened in 2012.

As of July 2014, the Nando's restaurant group was owned by South African businessman Dick Enthoven and his family, through the Luxembourg-domiciled company Yellowwoods. Enthoven's son Robby Enthoven, who took over running the restaurants in 1993, was responsible for expanding the Nando's chain in the United Kingdom.

In 2018, American-based recruitment website Indeed named Nando's as the UK's sixth best private sector employer based on millions of employee ratings and reviews.

== Worldwide locations ==
Nando's has locations in many countries.

=== South Africa ===
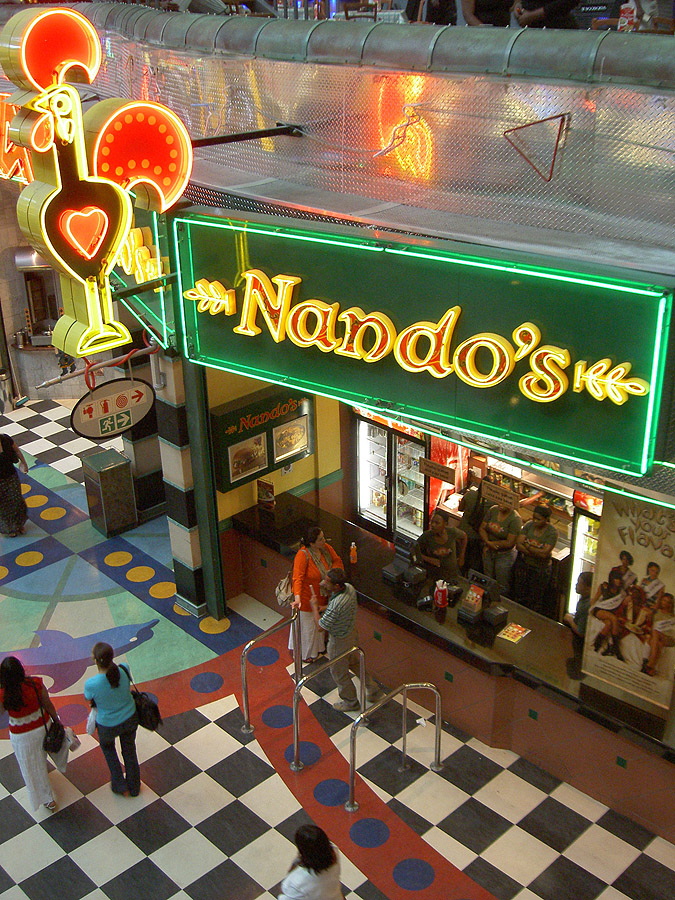
Nando's take-away in Canal Walk Shopping Mall, Cape Town, South Africa (2006)

Duarte and his friend Brozin, the founders of the first Nando's, bought a restaurant previously called "Chickenland" and renamed it Nando's. They opened it in 1987. By 2018, there were 340 Nando's restaurants throughout its home market of South Africa.

=== Other African countries ===
Nando's has been operating in Botswana since 1993. There are 19 restaurants in Botswana; 10 in Gaborone, two in Francistown and Palapye, and one each in Jwaneng, Maun, Mahalapye, Kasane and Letlhakane.

There are four outlets in Eswatini; in Mbabane, Matsapha, Ezulwini and Manzini (2022).

There are six Nando's restaurant outlets in Mauritius, in Curepipe, Grand-Baie, Moka, Riche Terre, Cascavelle and Vacoas-Phoenix.

Nando's began operating in Zambia in 2002. As of August 2021, Nando's has nine restaurants in Zambia; seven in Lusaka and one each in Ndola and Kitwe.

Nando's has been operating in Zimbabwe since 1995. As of August 2021, Nando's has 14 restaurants in Zimbabwe; nine in Harare and one each in Bulawayo, Mutare, Gweru, Kwekwe and Victoria Falls.

=== Middle Eastern countries ===
As of March 2026, Nando's has five restaurants in Bahrain; two in Manama and one each in Amwaj Islands, Isa Town and Saar.

In Qatar, Nando's has been established since 2001, with the first restaurant located on Salwa Road. As of October 2022, Nando's has eight branches in Qatar, seven of which are located in Doha while one is in Al Wakrah.

In Saudi Arabia, Nando's opened its first restaurant within the country on 12 December 2016 in Riyadh, and opened its first branch in Jeddah on 8 December 2018 As of March 2026, Nando's has nine branches in Saudi Arabia; three in Riyadh, three in Jeddah; and one each in Dhahran, Dammam and Khobar.

Nando's opened its first restaurant within the United Arab Emirates in Dubai (along Sheikh Zayed Road) in 2002 and opened its first branch in Abu Dhabi in 2014. As of August 2021, Nando's has 19 branches in the UAE; 13 in Dubai, three in Abu Dhabi and one each in Sharjah, Al Ain and Ras Al Khaimah.

As a former market, Israel was home to a successful Nando's franchise network throughout the 1990s and 2000s, with the Israeli operation involving the Brozin brothers alongside the international Nando's business.

The first Israeli branch opened in Herzliya in 1993, and by 1996 there were branches in Tel Aviv, Herzliya and Haifa, with plans for further expansion. By March 2004, the network had grown to 15 restaurants. In December 2005, Nando's Israel was acquired by Israeli businessman Yuval Doron's Eddy Global Holdings. Kenny Brozin remained chief executive of the Israeli operation until June 2006. By late 2007, Nando's had operated a franchise network in Israel for more than a decade, with the Israeli operations subsequently discontinued due to franchise-related issues.

=== Asian countries ===
Nando's has been established in India since 2010. As of September 2025, Nando's has 13 restaurants in India; four in New Delhi, three in Bangalore, two in Gurgaon, and one each in Noida, Chandigarh, Mumbai, Navi Mumbai, Pune and Dwarka (Delhi).

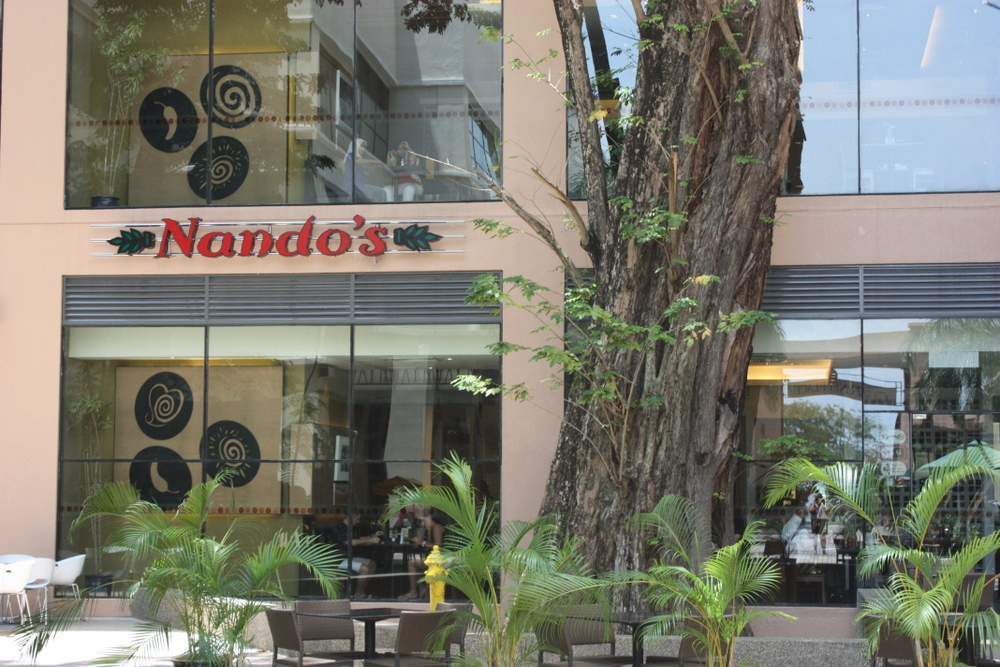
Nando's in Penang, Malaysia (2010)

Nando's has been established in Malaysia since 1998. The chain is very popular in the country and Malaysia is Nando's third largest market after the United Kingdom and Australia. Nando's is well known for its effective advertising that celebrates or satirises contemporary local issues.

As of August 2021, Nando's has 73 restaurants operating throughout Malaysia (with the exception of Perlis and Labuan); 27 in Selangor, 19 in Kuala Lumpur, two in Putrajaya, five in Penang, four in Johor, three in Malacca, three in Perak, three in Sarawak, two in Negeri Sembilan and Sabah and one each in Kedah, Kelantan, Pahang, Terengganu.

Nando's has been established in Pakistan since 2001. As of August 2021, Nando's has 12 restaurants throughout Pakistan; five in Karachi, four in Lahore and one each in Islamabad, Faisalabad and Rawalpindi.

In Singapore, Nando's opened its first restaurant on 9 May 2010; and as of August 2021 there were six outlets throughout the city of Singapore.

=== Australia ===
Nando's has been in continuous operation within Australia since 1990, when the first restaurant opened in Tuart Hill in Western Australia. As of August 2021, there were 155 restaurants in Australia; 63 in Victoria, 36 in Western Australia, 30 in Queensland, 16 in New South Wales, four in South Australia, two in the Northern Territory, three in Tasmania and two in the Australian Capital Territory. Per city, there are 59 in Melbourne, 34 in Perth, 20 in Brisbane, 15 in Sydney, four each in Adelaide and the Gold Coast, three in Ipswich, two each in Hobart, Canberra and Darwin and one each in Ballarat, Bunbury, Geelong, Kalgoorlie, Launceston, Newcastle, Rockhampton, Shepparton, the Sunshine Coast, Townsville and Traralgon.

There have been various public battles between the parent company and its Australian franchisees.

=== Canada ===
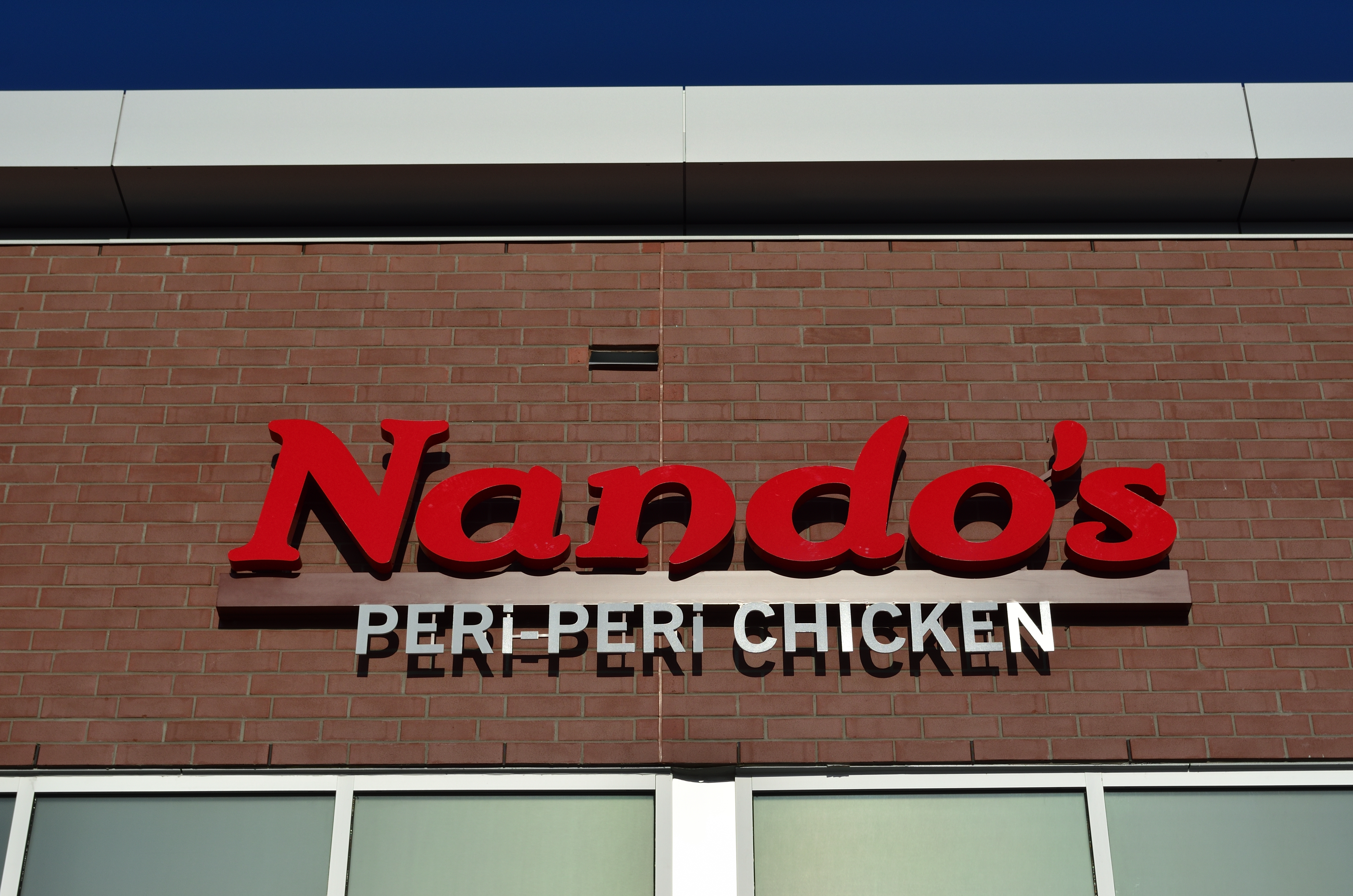
Nando's in Canada

Nando's has operated since 1994 in Canada. As of September 2025, there are 29 branches in Canada, with four in Alberta, 15 in British Columbia, and 10 in Ontario.

=== Ireland ===
Nando's was first established in Ireland in 2008. The company opened its flagship restaurant on St Andrew Street in the city centre of Dublin in November 2011, employing 60 staff members to manage a 3,800 square feet (350 m^{2}) space spread over two floors. As of August 2021, they have expanded to a total of 14 outlets in Ireland, with nine in Dublin, two in Cork, one in Newbridge, one in Limerick and one in Galway.

=== New Zealand ===
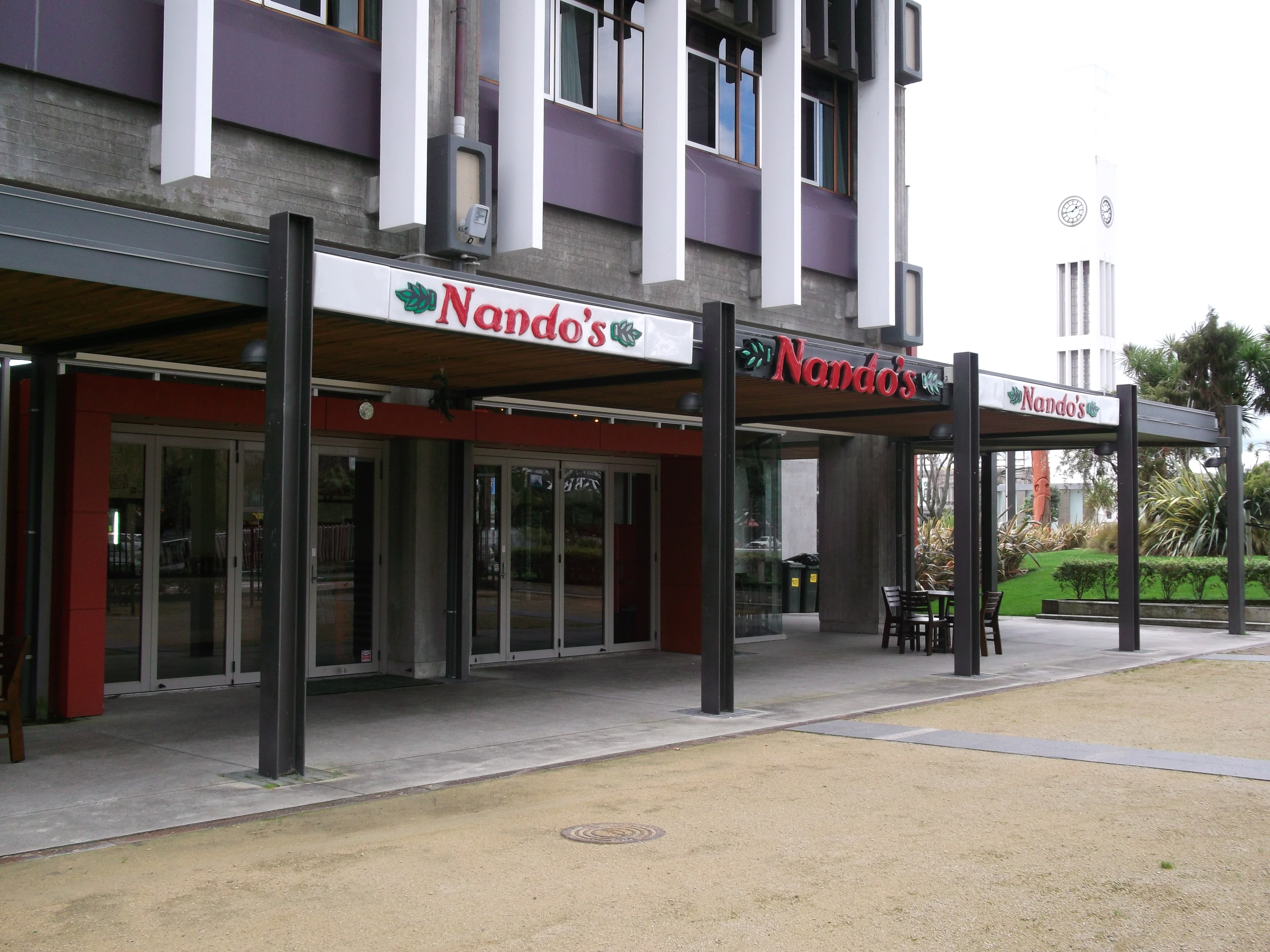
A Nando's franchise in Palmerston North, New Zealand.

Nando's opened their first outlet in New Zealand, at Glenfield in 2000. As of August 2021, there are 20 Nando's outlets throughout New Zealand, located in the regions of Auckland, Bay of Plenty, Christchurch, Hamilton, Wellington, and Dunedin.

In New Zealand, Nando's sources its chicken from SPCA Certified free-range farms. However, animal welfare organisation Animals Aotearoa has raised concerns that these chickens are selectively bred to grow abnormally fast, causing chronic pain, lameness, and difficulty accessing food and water. Some reportedly suffer respiratory issues and organ failure within weeks of hatching.

The organisation advocates for the Better Chicken Commitment (BCC), which Nando's UK and Ireland have adopted, but Nando's New Zealand has not, meaning unnaturally fast-growing breeds—and associated welfare issues—remain in use.

=== United Kingdom ===
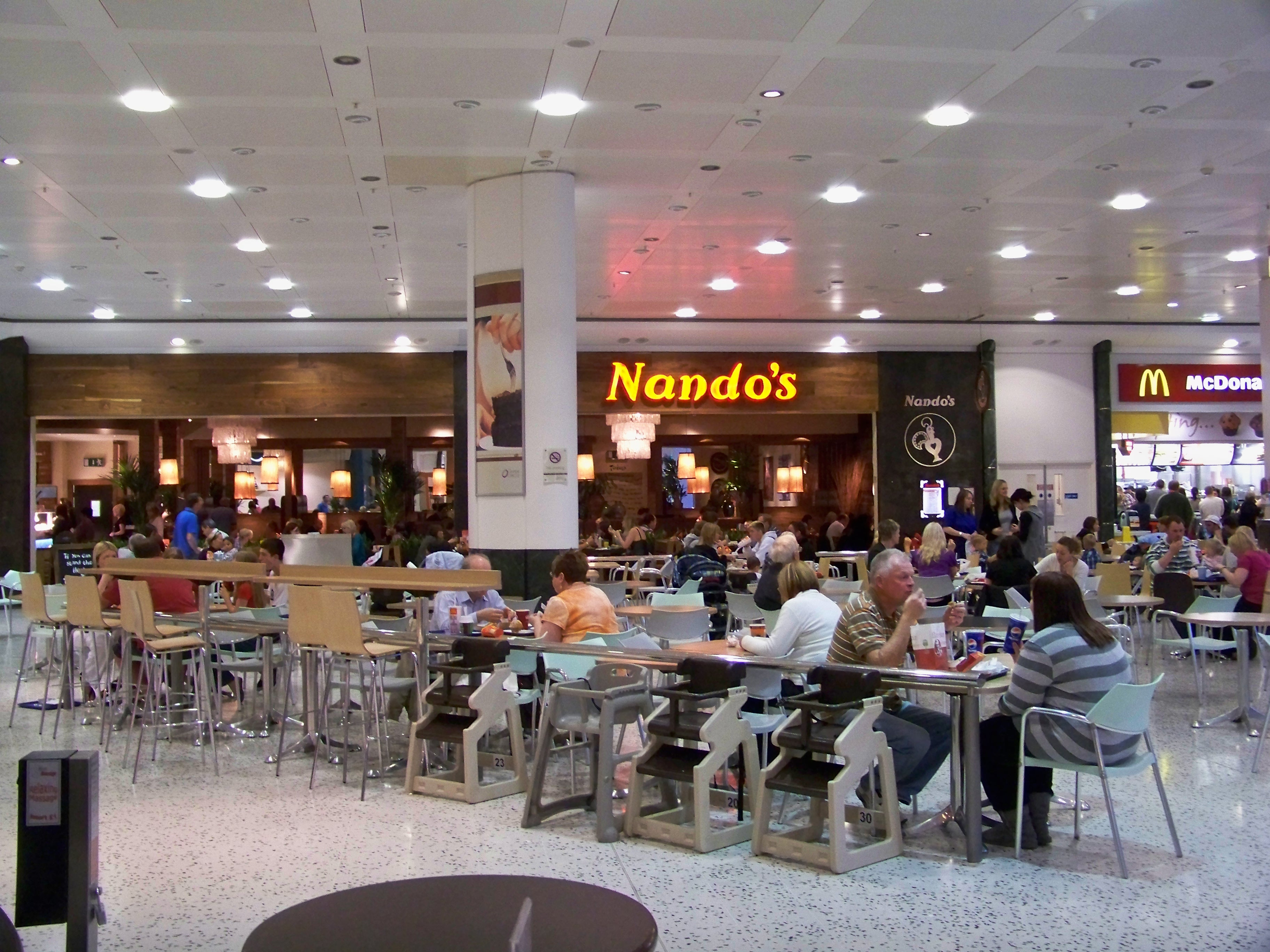
Nando's Restaurant at the White Rose Centre in Leeds, West Yorkshire

Nando's opened its first restaurants within the United Kingdom, in 1992, in the west London suburbs of Ealing and Earls Court, initially focusing on takeaway food. The UK arm, owned by the Enthoven family via a private equity company, struggled until chairman Dick Enthoven put his son Robert in control. The focus then moved from takeaways to a mixed-service (counter ordering and table service) model.

This decision was taken after Nando's partnered with Harrison, a branding and design agency. They also advised Nando's to design each restaurant individually so no two restaurants were the same, a brand characteristic of the chain. In 2013, the company employed around 8,000 staff in the UK and had over 280 branches, with about 60 serving food conforming with Islamic dietary laws.

In 2010, Nando's UK won the Sunday Times's 'best place to work' award in the big company category. Its sauces and marinades were also retailed in UK supermarkets.

Nando's claims to have the largest collection of South African art in the UK, with over 5,000 works displayed in restaurants; original artworks are commissioned by the company.

In March 2020, all of Nando's UK restaurants closed temporarily due to nationwide lockdown rules introduced by the government to limit the spread of COVID-19. In late April 2020, Nando's reopened select locations for delivery and collection services, with many more locations opening throughout May. In early July 2020, the restaurant chain started reopening a few of its outlets for eat-in service.

In August 2021, Nando's UK was forced to temporarily close 45 of its 450 restaurants due to a shortage of chicken. A Nando's spokesperson said: "The UK food industry has been experiencing disruption across its supply chain in recent weeks due to staff shortages and Covid isolations, and a number of our restaurants have been impacted."

The UK is Nando's largest market.

=== United States ===
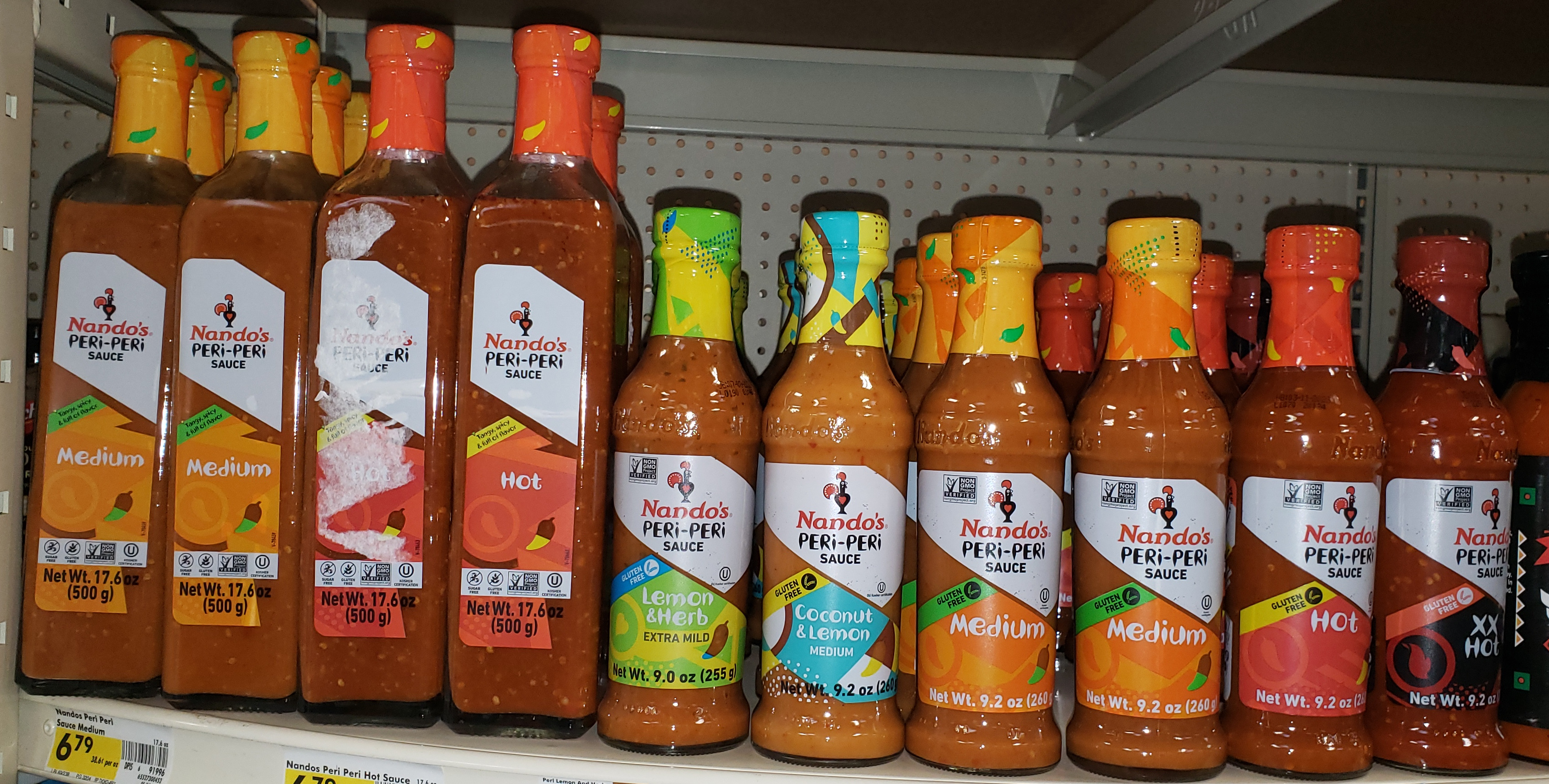
Nando's peri-peri sauces in a California grocery store

Nando's opened its first restaurant location within the United States in Washington, D.C. in 2008. After opening more outlets within the Washington metropolitan area, it expanded into the Chicago metropolitan area, opening its first outlet on 20 May 2015 within the metro area. As of February 2026, there are 46 restaurant outlets in five states and the District of Columbia: 12 in Illinois, six in Washington, D.C., 10 in Maryland, 11 in Virginia, two in Georgia, and five in Texas.

== Advertising ==
=== Australian refugee advertisement ===
In 2002, Nando's ran an advertising campaign in Australia based around a political controversy regarding the mandatory detention of refugees. The detainees had been waging a hunger strike campaign, even resorting to sewing their lips closed. Nando's adverts proclaimed that the strikers "decided to unsew their lips after hearing the news that with every Nando's quarter chicken combo, Nando's are giving away an extra quarter chicken free."

Melbourne's Sphere Advertising said that the ad was designed to spark controversy, saying that they knew that "there's a section of our audience that's going to be uncomfortable... but we want to evoke a response."

=== Malema advertisement ===
During the South African national elections of 2009, Nando's made an advert lampooning African National Congress Youth League then president Julius Malema by using a puppet that resembled him. Malema's lawyers sued Nando's and the original advert was removed. However, an altered version was released, with the puppet's face pixelated and the voice altered. The puppet used in the advert was later sold at auction for 100,000 rand, which was donated to an educational charity.

=== "Last dictators" advertisement ===
In 2011, Nando's launched a "Last dictators" advert in South Africa. The 60-second commercial shows a sad Robert Mugabe dining alone at Christmas in a large mansion while he reminisces about "happier times" with former dictators, such as playing water tag with Muammar Gaddafi, singing karaoke with Mao Zedong, making snow angels in the sand with Saddam Hussein, pushing P. W. Botha on a swing set, and riding a Covenanter cruiser tank with Idi Amin in a similar fashion to Leonardo DiCaprio and Kate Winslet embracing each other from the film Titanic, while the music from "Those Were the Days" is played.

Musekiwa Kumbula, holder of the Nando's franchise in Zimbabwe, said his group "strongly feels the advertisement is insensitive and in poor taste." The advert also offended Chipangano, a Zimbabwean youth militia loyal to Mugabe, who then demanded an apology from Nando's, threatened to boycott the South Africa-based chain, and demanded the advert be withdrawn or the restaurant face retribution. Nando's South Africa subsequently withdrew the advert citing threats to its staff in Zimbabwe from a youth group.

== Corporate affairs ==
Both The Guardian newspaper (UK) and the American non-profit publication ICIJ received documents in July 2014 revealing the details of past and present offshore clients of wealth managers Kleinwort Benson, including the Nando's restaurant group. The Guardian published its belief that, through the use of businesses in Malta, Guernsey and the Netherlands, Enthoven legally reduces the group's UK corporation tax bill by "up to a third." According to the British newspaper, Enthoven's profits eventually accumulate in the Kleinwort Benson-managed "Taro III Trust" that is based in Jersey and contains at least £750 million.

While no member of the Enthoven family agreed to speak with The Guardian, a company representative explained that UK tax laws are not applicable to Enthoven, as "he is not resident in the US or the UK." The spokesperson also stated that, in the UK, Nando's paid corporation tax of £12.6 million on a profit of £58.2 million for the year ending February 2013. In its 2023 tax strategy, the company states that "Nando's policy is to maintain its tax affairs responsibly and transparently. Nando's doesn’t enter into transactions simply to secure tax advantages."

=== Social Impact ===
Alongside his management roles with Nando's, co-founder Robert Brozin has been involved in various social-impact initiatives. He founded Goodbye Malaria, an initiative supporting malaria-elimination programmes in southern Africa and was involved in establishing the Harambee Youth Employment Accelerator, which works to improve employment opportunities for young people in South Africa. Brozin has also supported initiatives focused on revitalisation of Johannesburg's inner city and the future of Chris Hani Baragwanath Academic Hospital. His philanthropic work has been recognised within South Africa's Jewish community, including through his receiving the 2023 Kirsh Family Lifetime Achievement Award in honour of Helen Suzman at the Absa Jewish Achiever Awards.

== See also ==
- Chicken restaurant
- List of fast-food chicken restaurants
- Oporto – Australian-based Portuguese themed chicken restaurant
- TASTE Holdings – management group in which Chickenland (Pty) Ltd has significant shareholding
