= Japanese School in Bahrain =

The Japanese School in Bahrain
- バハレーン日本人学校 المدرسة اليابانية في البحرين

Location
- House No.1526, Road No.3363, Block No.533 Sarr, BAHRAIN; 26.1971°N 50.4798°E

Information
- Established: 1984
- Closed: 2020
- Website: jps30084.wixsite.com/bhjpshp

The Japanese School in Bahrain (バハレーン日本人学校, Baharēn Nihonjin Gakkō; Arabic: المدرسة اليابانية في البحرين) was a Japanese international school located in Sar, Northern Governorate, Bahrain, near Manama.

The school was founded in 1984. As of 1989 it had 87 students, with none of them being Bahrainis.

Some students visited the Bahrain Bayan School in May 2018 as part of a cross culture initiative.

Due to a decrease in the number of students, the Japanese School in Bahrain has been closed as of March 31, 2020.

== See also ==
- List of educational institutions in Bahrain
