= Syed Nazim Ali =

Indian researcher

- Born: Warangal, Telangana, India
- Education: University of Strathclyde (Ph.D.), Osmania University (B.Sc.)
- Occupations: Research Division Director, Hamad Bin Khalifa University
- Known for: Islamic Social Finance, Information Science, Bibliometrician
- Spouse: Naseem Ali
- Awards: Harvard University Muslim Alumni Foundation Award, LARIBA Award for Excellence in Islamic Banking

Syed Nazim Ali is a research professor and director of the Research Division at the College of Islamic Studies, Hamad Bin Khalifa University, Qatar Foundation. He is one of the founders of the Harvard Islamic Finance Program and was associated with it from 1995 to 2014. During his association with Harvard he worked on several initiatives including Harvard University Forum on Islamic Finance which is continued by Harvard Muslim Alumni Association. He also initiated the annual joint workshop in London with the London School of Economics in 2007 and now continued at SOAS-University of London and had launched the Islamic Finance DataBank.

He played role in improving, understanding and combatting misconceptions about the Islamic Finance Industry, major activities were: Islamic Finance Seminar 101 at the U.S. Department of the Treasury and subsequently his work with The Federal Reserve Bank of New York.

He has published extensively and is a regular speaker.

== Career ==
Ali worked at King Faisal University – Dammam and Al-Hasa, as a Director of Libraries from 1976 to 1983. He later moved to the University of Bahrain in 1984. In 1995 he joined Harvard to start Islamic Finance Project.

== Education ==
Ali holds a Ph.D. (1983) from the University of Strathclyde, Glasgow, Great Britain, and BA (1970) from Osmania University in Hyderabad, India.

== Books ==
- Ali, Syed Nazim and Oseni, Umar A. (eds). Waqf Development and Innovations: Socio-Economic and Legal Perspectives, London: Routledge, 320p. 2021, (ISBN 978-0-367-74477-9)
- Alam, Nafis and Ali, Syed Nazim (eds). Fintech, Digital Currency and the Future of Islamic Finance: Strategic, Regulatory and Adoption Issues in the Gulf Cooperation Council, Springer International Publishing, 2021, 246p., (ISBN 978-3-030-49247-2)
- Ali, S. Nazim; Tariq, Wijdan. and Al Quradaghi, B. A. (eds.). The Edinburgh Companion to Shari‘ah Governance in Islamic Finance. Edinburgh, U.K: Edinburgh University Press, April 2020, 480p. (ISBN 978-1-4744-3600-7)
- Oseni, Umar A. and Ali, S. Nazim. (eds.) Fintech in Islamic Finance: Theory and Practice. London: Taylor & Francis, 2019, 350p. (ISBN 978-1-138-49480-0)
- Ali, S. Nazim. and Nisar S. (eds.) Takaful and Islamic Cooperative Finance: Challenges and Opportunities, Cheltenham, U.K: Edward Elgar, 2016, 345p. (ISBN 978-1-78536-335-1)
- Ali, S. Nazim.; Oseni, U; and Nisar, S (eds.) Islamic Finance and Development, Cambridge: Massachusetts, Harvard Law School, Islamic Finance Project, 2014, 315p. (ISBN 0-9702835-8-X)
- Ali, S. Nazim. (ed.) Building Bridges across Financial Communities: The Global Financial Crisis, Social Responsibility, and Faith-Based Finance, Cambridge: Massachusetts, Harvard Law School, Islamic Finance Project, 2012, 334p. (ISBN 0-9702835-9-8)
- Ali, S. Nazim. (ed.) Shari‘a-Compliant Microfinance, London: Routledge, 2011, 295p. (ISBN 978-0-415-78266-1)
- Ali, S. Nazim. (ed.) Islamic Finance: Innovation and Authenticity, Cambridge, Massachusetts: Harvard Law School, Islamic Finance Project, 2010, 320p. (ISBN 0-9702835-7-1)
- Ali, S. Nazim. (ed.) Integrating Islamic Finance into the Mainstream: Regulation, Standardisation, and Transparency, Cambridge, Massachusetts: Harvard Law School, Islamic Finance Project, 261p. 2007, (ISBN 0-9702835-6-3)
- Ali, S. Nazim. (ed.) Islamic Finance: Current Legal and Regulatory Issues. Cambridge, Massachusetts: Harvard Law School, Islamic Finance Project, 2005, 222p. (ISBN 0-9702835-5-5)
- Ali, S. Nazim. and Ali, Naseem N. Information Sources on Islamic Banking and Economics 1980–90. London: Routledge, 1994, 362p. (ISBN 0-7103-0486-2)

== Book chapters ==
- Ali, S. Nazim. Islamic Finance at Harvard University. In: Islamic Finance in Western Higher Education: Developments and Prospects, Basingstoke, Hampshire: Palgrave Macmillan, 2012, (pp. 209–228)
- Ali, S. Nazim. A Roadmap for Making Islamic Finance Sources More Accessible: The Role of Secondary Services in the Dissemination of Research, In: Proceedings of the 7th International Conference on Islamic Economics and Finance Conference Papers, Jeddah: King Abdulaziz University, 2008, (pp. 225–34.)
- Ali, S. Nazim. Bahrain. In ALA World Encyclopedia of Library and Information Sciences: Chicago, ALA, 3rd edition, 1993, (pp. 98–100.)
- Ali, S. Nazim. Optical disk and the developing countries. Proceedings of the International Conference on Databases in the Humanities and Social Sciences. Edited by Lawrence J. McCrank, Medford, New Jersey: Learned Information, 1989, (pp. 9–12.)Ali, S. Nazim. CD-ROM databases as an alternative means to online information: the experience of a university library in developing countries, In: Proceedings of International Online Information Meeting, London: learned Information Europe, 1988, (pp. 569–573.)

== Journal articles ==
- Ali, S. Nazim and Al-Quradaghi, Bahnaz, "Publishing Islamic Economics & Finance Research: Polemics, Perceptions and Prospects", International Journal of Islamic and Middle Eastern Finance and Management, 12 (3), 2019, (pp. 346–367)
- Ali, S. Nazim. "Building Trust in Islamic Finance Products and Services" Society and Business Review, 12 (3), 2017, (pp. 356–372)
- Ali, S. Nazim. "Moving Towards Community Driven Islamic Finance" Journal of Islamic Business and Management, 7 (1), 2017, (pp. 11–27)
- Nu’Man, R and Ali, S. Nazim. "Islamic Economics and Finance Education: Consensus on Reform" Journal of Islamic Economics, Banking and Finance, 12 (3), 2016, (pp. 75–97)
- Ali, S. Nazim and Nisar, S. "The Significance of Faith-based Ethical Principles in Responding to the Recurring Financial Crises." Journal of Islamic Banking and Finance, 33 (4), 2016, (pp. 24–35)
- Rahman, S.M; Ali, S.S; Ali, S. Nazim "Financing Sovereign Developmental Activities Through Non-Interest-Bearing Instruments", Journal of Islamic Finance, 5 (1), 2016, (pp. 26–44)
- Ali, S. Nazim. The Use and Abuse of Limited Liabilities. New Horizon, No. 191, 2014, (pp. 43–46.)
- Ali, S..Nazim. Islamic Finance at Harvard. Economic Cooperative and Development Review, 7 (1), 2014, (pp. 23–41)
- Ali, S. Nazim. Perceptions Surrounding the Contemporary Practice of Islamic Finance. New Horizon, July–September, No. 138, 2013, (pp. 12–16)
- Ali, S. Nazim. and Syed, Abdur-Rahman. Post-9/11 Perceptions of Islamic Finance. International Research Journal of Finance and Economics, Issue 39, 2010, (pp. 27–39.)
- Rehman, Aamir and Ali, S. Nazim. Islamic Finance: The New Global Player. Harvard Business Review, February 2008, (pp. 43)
- Ali, S. Nazim. Islamic Finance and Economics as Reflected in Research and Publications. Review of Islamic Economics, 12(1), 2008, (pp. 151–168.)
- Ali, S. Nazim. Innovation and Authenticity. New Horizon, October–December, 2008, (pp. 1–3.)
- Ali, S. Nazim. Financing the Poor: Towards Islamic Microfinance. New Horizon, July–September, 2007. (pp. 18–20.)
- Ali, S. Nazim; Young, H.C; and Ali, N.M. Determining the quality of publications and research for tenure or promotion decisions: a preliminary checklist to asset. Library Review, Vol. 45, 1996, (pp. 39–52.)
- Al-Qaisi, M and Ali, S. Nazim. Searching CD-ROM databases for non-English speaking users. New Library World (MCB Pub. London), 1995, (pp. 24–27.)
- Ali, S. Nazim. Subject relationship between articles determined by co-occurrence of keywords in citing and cited titles. Journal of Information Science (Elsevier, Amsterdam), Vol. 19, 1993, (pp. 1–7.)
- Ali, S. Nazim. Information on Islamic banking and economics as represented by selected databases. International Journal of Information Management (Butterworth, Oxford), Vol. 13, 1993, (pp. 205–219.)
- Ali, S. Nazim. and Young, H.C. Information access through CD-ROM and its impact upon faculty research output: a case of university in third countries. Microcomputers for Information Management (Ablex Pub. New Jersey), Vol. 9, 1992, (pp. 177–189.)
- Young, H.C. and Ali, S. Nazim. The Gulf war and its effect on information and library services in the Arabian Gulf with particular reference to the State of Bahrain. Journal of Information Science (Elsevier, Holland), Vol. 18, 1992, (pp. 453–462.)
- Ali, S. Nazim. and Tikku, U.K. Postdoctoral research in library and information science: is there a need? Journal of Education for Library and Information Science (ALISE, Sarasota, Florida), Vol. 31, 1991, (pp. 362–364.)
- Ali, S. Nazim. Database on optical discs and their potential in developing countries. Journal of the American Society for Information Science (Wiley, New York), Vol. 41, 1990, (pp. 238–244.)
- Ali, S. Nazim. Science and technology information transfer in developing countries: some problems and suggestions. Journal of Information Science (Elsevier, Holland), Vol. 15, 1990, (pp. 81–93.)
- Ali, S. Nazim. Serials management in developing countries. The Serials Librarian (Haworth Press, New York) Vol. 18, 1990, (pp. 147–154.)
- Ali, S. Nazim. Science and technology information transfer in developing countries: some problems and suggestions. Journal of Information Science (Elsevier, Holland), Vol. 15, 1990, (pp. 81–93.)
- Ali, S. Nazim. Information on CD-ROM: a directory 2: Factual databanks and full-text files. Information Management (Mansell, Pub. London), Vol. 5, 1989, (pp. 41–45.)
- Ali, S. Nazim. Acquisition of scientific literature in developing countries – 5: Arab Gulf Countries. Information Management (Mansell Pub. London), Vol. 5, 1989, (pp. 108–115.)
- Ali, S. Nazim. CD-ROM databases as an alternative means to online information: the experience of a university library in developing countries. Microcomputers for Information Management (Ablex Publishing, New Jersey), Vol. 5, 1989, (pp. 197–202.)
- Ali, S. Nazim. Information on CD-ROM: a directory 2: Factual databanks and full-text files. Information Management (Mansell, Pub. London), Vol. 5, 1989, (pp. 41–45.)
- Ali, S. Nazim. Acquisition of scientific literature in developing countries – 5: Arab Gulf Countries. Information Management (Mansell Pub. London), Vol. 5, 1989, (pp. 108–115.)
- Ali, S. Nazim. CD-ROM databases as an alternative means to online information: the experience of a university library in developing countries. Microcomputers for Information Management (Ablex Publishing, New Jersey), Vol. 5, 1989, (pp. 197–202.)
- Ali, S. Nazim. Library and information science literature: research results. International Library Review (Academic Press, London), Vol. 17, 1985, (pp. 117–128.)
- Ali, S. Nazim. Library science research: some results of its dissemination and utilization. Libri (Munksgaard, Copenhagen), Vol. 35, 1985, (pp. 151–162.)
- Ali, S. Nazim. Information seeking-behavior of Scotland's library practitioners. Library Review (MCB Pub. London), Vol. 33, 1984, (pp. 219–224.)
- Ali, S. Nazim. Saudi Arabia University Libraries, International Leads (ALA, Chicago), 1984.
- Ali, S. Nazim. Food Science and Technology Literature: A Bibliometric Study, SRELS Journal of Information Management (Bangalore, India), 1983.

== Proceedings edited ==
- Ali, S. Nazim. (ed.) Islamic Finance: Dynamics and Development: Proceedings of the Fifth Harvard University on Islamic Finance. Cambridge, Massachusetts: Center for Middle Eastern Studies, Harvard University, 2003 310p. (ISBN 0-9702835-1-2)
- Ali, S. Nazim. (ed.) Islamic Finance: The Task Ahead: Proceedings of the Fourth Harvard University Forum on Islamic Finance. Cambridge Massachusetts: Center for Middle Eastern Studies, Harvard University, 2002, 298p. (ISBN 0-9702835-2-0)
- Ali. S. Nazim. (ed.) Islamic Finance: Local Challenges, Global Opportunities: Proceedings of the Third Harvard University Forum on Islamic Finance. Cambridge, Massachusetts: Center for Middle Eastern Studies, Harvard University, 2000, 319p. (ISBN 0-9702835-1-2)
- Ali, S. Nazim. (ed.) Islamic Finance into the 21st Century: Proceedings of the Second Harvard University Forum on Islamic Finance. Cambridge, Massachusetts: Center for Middle Eastern Studies, Harvard University, 1999, 329p.
