= Open Insurance =

Australian insurance company

Open
- Type: Private
- Industry: Insurance
- Founded: July 2016; 10 years ago Sydney, Australia
- Founders: Jason Wilby (CEO) & Jonathan Buck(CEO)
- Headquarters: Sydney, Auckland, Australia, New Zealand
- Area served: Australia and New Zealand
- Products: Home, Car & Travel Insurance
- Subsidiaries: Huddle huddle.com.au
- Website: beopen.com

Open is an embedded finance company that builds and manages infrastructure for the global insurance industry. It is based in Sydney, Australia, and Auckland, New Zealand.

The company primarily offers embedded insurance products that are managed with application programming interfaces (APIs). These products are embedded and offered to the customers of telecommunication, energy, travel, banking and retail companies.

== History ==
Open (Open Insurance Pty Ltd) was founded in Australia in June 2016 by British expats Jonathan Buck and Jason Wilby. The pair initially launched a consumer brand, Huddle, with the aim of challenging traditional financial services in Australia and offering a transparent and technology driven model for consumers.

Early products were based on the concept of the peer economy, with the aim of reducing the cost of financial products such as loans and insurance in Australia.

In April 2017 the company became a certified B Corporation, to verify that the company is meeting obligations that benefit all stakeholders not just shareholders.

Two years after its founding the company secured a $19.25 million Series B investment led by Airtree Ventures.

In 2020 the company launched the Open Insurance stack, a collection of applications and infrastructure used by global insurance companies to embed car, home and travel insurance.

== Funding ==
Open is a privately owned company that initially raised $6 million from investors, including Richard Enthoven, and Hollard Insurance Group. The company's insurance products are also underwritten by Hollard Insurance Group.

In November 2018 the company announced a new round of funding. Through this Series A the company secured a further $19.25 million led by Airtree Ventures.

In August 2020 the company announced a follow-on round for their current investors. This raised $3.1m and was again led by Airtree Ventures.

In August 2021, Open announced a Series B, led by Movac valued at $31 million.

Funding History
Date	Funding Type	Number of Investors	Money Raised	Lead Investor	Valuation
May, 2016	Seed Round	2	$500k	-	—
June, 2016	Seed Round	3	$5.5m	The Hollard Insurance Company (Australia)	—
Nov, 2018	Series A	7	$19.25M	Airtree Ventures	—
Aug, 2020	Series A.1	4	$3.1m	Airtree Ventures	—
Aug, 2021	Series B	12	$31m	Movac	

== Products and services ==
Open provides pricing, claims and administration infrastructure required for insurers, brokers, and retail brands to offer service insurance online.

Open's customers include Telstra, Bupa, Polestar, and Slingshot.
