= University of Technology Bahrain =

Coordinates: 26.1859°N 50.5180°E

- Motto: "From what inspires you to what you'll inspire next"
- Type: Private, for-profit
- Established: 1 September 2002; 22 years ago
- President: Dr. Hasan Almula
- Location: Salmabad, Bahrain
- Website: www.utb.edu.bh

The University of Technology Bahrain (UTB) is a Bahrain-based university. Previously known as AMA International University of Bahrain, the university rebranded in 2021 after the acquisition deal by GFH financial group in Bahrain. The university provides many programs in business, engineering and information technology and seeks to be one of the leading business and technology school across the GCC. It follows a trimestral calendar, in which a typical four-year collegiate education program under a semestral calendar is completed in three years and three months. The university offers a bachelor's degree in international business, business informatic, informatics engineering, mechatronics engineering and computer science besides the MBA program.

== History ==
The University of Technology Bahrain (AMA International University) opened in September 2002 after the AMA Education system brokered a partnership with the government of Bahrain to establish the AMA International University in Manama. In 2008 AMA International University moved to their new campus in Salmabad.

Awarding: AMA International University has been awarded by the Higher education council for the IA (Institutional Accreditation) In May 2019. This will allow GCC students to join UTB (AMAIUB) and be one of their students.

== Degrees offered ==
=== Degree programs ===
- B.S. in Computer Science
- B.S. in International Business
- B.S. in Business Informatics
- B.S. in Engineering Informatics
- B.S. in Mechatronics Engineering

=== Graduate programs ===
- M.B.A. (Master in business administration)

== See also ==
- List of universities in Bahrain
