= TASTE Holdings =

South African management group

TASTE Holdings Ltd.
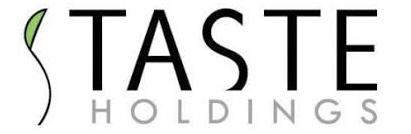
- Type: Public
- Traded as: JSE: TAS
- Industry: Retail
- Predecessor: Scooters Pizza (Pty) Ltd
- Headquarters: Sandton, South Africa
- Key people: Tyrone Moodley (CEO)
- Revenue: R 136,3 million (2009)
- Number of employees: (1000)
- Subsidiaries: Starbucks South Africa, Domino's South Africa
- Website: http://www.tasteholdings.co.za/

TASTE Holdings was a South African management group with subsidiaries in the food and jewellery market. It was listed on the JSE with ticker symbol is of TAS, after it had been moved from the AltX board in June 2011.

== History ==
TASTE Holdings has been part of the Endeavor (non-profit) network since 2007. In the following years, it had a strong presence with Domino's Pizza, an American multinational pizza restaurant chain, and with Starbucks - an American multinational chain of coffeehouses and roastery reserves.

TASTE Holdings has sold its hospitality service interests and has been renamed to Luxe Holdings Limited since 2020.

== Subsidiaries ==
=== Food ===
- Maxi's - a chain of restaurants
- Scooters Pizza - a chain of pizza take-away outlets (It predates TASTE Holdings)
- St. Elmo's - a chain of pizza restaurants (acquired November 2010)
- Fish and Chip Co. - a chain of seafood take-away restaurants (acquired February 2012)

=== Jewellery ===
- NWJ Jewellery - a jewellery chain (acquired August 2008)

== Owners ==
- Nando's owned approximately 14.5% of TASTE holdings.
- Brimstone Investments Corporation owned approximately 12%
