= Robert Brozin =

South African businessman and co-founder of Nando's

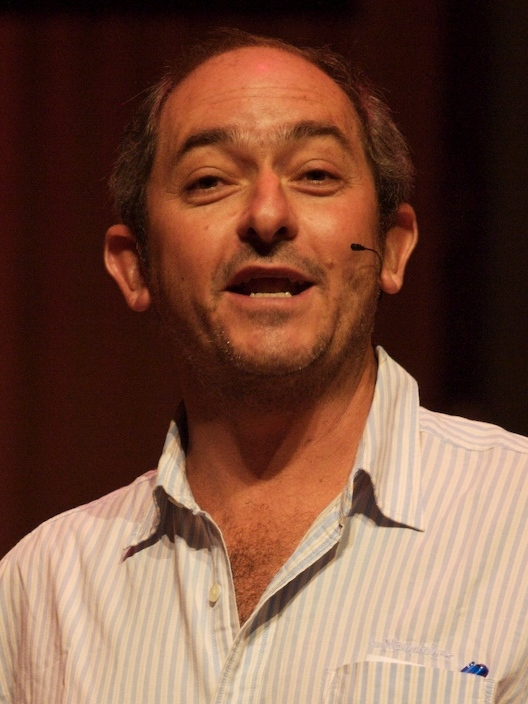
- Brozin in 2008
- Born: 17 December 1959 (age 66); Middelburg, Eastern Transvaal, South Africa
- Occupation: Entrepreneur
- Known for: Nando's

Robert Brozin (born 17 December 1959) is a South African entrepreneur, businessman and best known as the co-founder of Nando's international restaurant chain.

== Early life ==
He was born in Middelburg, Eastern Transvaal, South Africa. His father was Max Brozin, a Jewish accountant and his mother, Vera Sheila Collis. He attended school at Middelburg Primary and then finished his schooling at King David High School, in Linksfield, Johannesburg. After high school, he completed his compulsory two-year military service with the South African Defence Force. He then attended the University of the Witwatersrand and obtained a Bachelor of Commerce in 1984. He then joined Price Waterhouse for two years and unsuccessfully attempted to take his Chartered Accountant articles.

He left Price Waterhouse and joined his father's business at Teltron, which was the agency in South Africa for Sanyo Electronics. He became the company's marketing manager. He remained there for three years before becoming a fulltime entrepreneur at Nando's.

== Nando's ==
Brozin met his future partner, Portuguese-born Fernando Duarte, who was Teltron's technical manager. Duarte took Brozin for lunch at a Portuguese takeaway restaurant called Chickenland in Rosettenville. The restaurant served Portuguese dishes but it was the flame-grilled chicken and its peri-peri sauce attracted Brozin to the restaurant's concept. Peri-peri chicken was only on the menu in South Africa at small Portuguese family owned businesses and in Mozambique and Angola. In 1987, they purchased a 67% share of the business before buying it outright in 1990 and then rebranded it as Nando's. Brozin initially funded the investment, money from family and friends, while Duarte ran the business, but he soon joined the restaurant full-time. In 1990, they had three restaurants in South Africa and one in Portugal. Dick Enthoven and his family acquired a 30% stake in Nando's, investing R1,000,000 and the business model would expand, especially in the UK as Capricorn Ventures International in 1992. Nando's would be listed on the JSE in 1997 but delisted in 2003 when the company adopted a franchise model. In 2009, he stepped down managing and brought in professional management.

In order to grow the chicken business in the home market, dominated in South Africa by KFC, they decided to use 30-second TV advertisements by a new ad agency HuntLascaris (TBWA Africa).

Brozin remained CEO of Nando’s until 2010 when he stepped down so professional managers could manage the company's growth and David Niven, head of the American and European Nando’s division, took over.

== Philanthropy ==
After stepping down from the daily management at Nando's, he involved himself in philanthropic organisations such as Goodbye Malaria which promotes the use of spraying and mobile testing clinics as a means of fighting mosquito-borne diseases in Southern Mozambique. Another group he started as Harambee Youth Employment Accelerator, a training incubator for unemployed youth, assisting them to be better work ready. He also worked on the Nando’s Art Initiative project that brings South African art to the Nando's chain of restaurants.

== Personal life ==
Brozin is married and has three children.
