= Al Noor International School =

Coordinates: 26.1682°N 50.6022°E

- مدرسة النور العالمية
- Sitra; Capital Governorate; Sitra; Bahrain

Information
- School type: Private
- Motto: Knowledge is Power
- Opened: 1993
- Founder: Ali Hassan
- Status: Open
- Sister school: Al school
- President: Muha
- Chairman: Shan al rahman
- Director: Mahd W huddian ansari
- Principal: Moha
- Grades: Kindergarten to Grade 12
- Gender: Numair
- Age range: 3 to 18
  - Grade 10: IGCSE
  - Grade 11: AS Level
  - Grade 12: A Level
- Average class size: 24
- Hours in school day: From 7:30 a.m. to 12:30 p.m. until the third grade and from 7:30 a.m. to 2 p.m. from the fourth grade
- Houses: Diamond, Emerald, Ruby, and Sapphire
- Colors: Yellow, Green, Red, and Blue

Al Noor International School is a private school situated in Bahrain and founded on 6 September 1993. The school teaches over 3000 students from more than 40 countries, mainly the United States, the United Kingdom, Bahrain, India, and Pakistan. It initially started with a programme of classes for primary schoolchildren in the district of Mahooz, prior to its relocation to the island of Sitra. It currently caters to the educational needs of students from over than 40 countries and follows a curricular program made up of three types: British, Bahraini, and Indian.

== British curriculum ==
This section of the school follows the IGCSE course offered by the University of Cambridge Local Examinations Syndicate as well as AS Level (Advanced Subsidiary Level), and A Level (Advanced Level) qualifications and was named the second school in the Middle East to become a Cambridge Fellowship Center and the first in Bahrain. Grades range from Kindergarten to Grade 12 (commonly referred to as A Levels).

== Bahraini curriculum (Thawjihiya) ==
The course is almost identical to that offered by the Ministry of Education, Bahrain. In addition to subjects that are offered in Arabic, the curriculum offers English classes as well as Computer Science courses.

== Indian curriculum (CBSE) ==
The Indian curriculum follows the central board of secondary Education (CBSE), Delhi, and is widely recognized as one of the oldest educational systems in India. CBSE admissions are very sought after, and the curriculum gives students a unique advantage for higher studies. The school is affiliated to CBSE, Delhi. Grades range from kindergarten to Grade 12.

== Facilities ==
The school has six computer laboratories, and laboratories dedicated to Physics, Chemistry, and Biology.

== See also ==
- List of educational institutions in Bahrain
