= St Christopher's School, Bahrain =

Coordinates: 26.1591°N 50.5422°E

St Christopher's School
- (Bahrain) Raffa; Bahrain

Information
- Type: International
- Motto: Education for a shared humanity
- Established: 1961
- Principal: Simon Watson
- Gender: Co-educational
- Website: www.st-chris.net

St Christopher's School is a British international school located in Raffa in Zallaq, Bahrain (senior campus) and Sar, Bahrain (infant and junior campuses), offering British curriculum education. It offers primary to secondary education ranging from reception to Sixth form. Students sit GCSE and A-level or International Baccalaureate examinations.

In 2006, the Guardian newspaper listed St. Christopher's amongst the top eight best international schools offering a British curriculum around the world.

In December 2013, Queen Elizabeth II awarded the school's long term principal, Ed Goodwin, with an OBE for his contribution to British education in the Middle East.

Since 2021, St. Christopher's has been included in The Schools Index as one of the 150 best international schools in the world and among top 15 schools in the Middle East.

The school that regularly hosts social events are regarded as one of the most reputable in the Gulf region.

The new senior school opened in August 2026 building for the senior students is set to be constructed.

Isa Town Campus has been closed since August 2026.

== School principals ==
Date		Principal
2018	Present	Dr Simon Watson
1995	2018	Mr Ed Goodwin OBE
1994	1995	Mr Philip Johnston
1976	1994	Mr Jim Wrench
1973	1976	Mr E Philips
1967	1973	Mr J W Adler
1965	1967	Rev HJ Figg Edgington
1963	1965	Mrs Jean Bull
1961	1963	Mrs V Williams

== Notable alumni ==
- Yara Salman

== See also ==
- List of schools in Bahrain
