= Ibn Khuldoon National School =

Coordinates: 26.1588°N 50.5508°E

- Isa Town; Bahrain

Information
- Type: Private
- Established: 1983
- President: Dr. Kamal Abdel-Nour
- Grades: K-12
- Enrollment: 1500
- Colors: Maroon; Gold white
- Mascot: The Coyote
- Website: Official website

The Ibn Khuldoon National School is a school in Isa Town, Bahrain. The school is private, coeducational, non-profit, self-supporting, and bilingual. It offers an education based on the American curriculum, along with the International Baccalaureate (IB) option. The school offers a bilingual program of study for only Bahraini students from Kindergarten to Grade Twelve.

== History ==
IKNS opened its doors to students in 1983. The first group of students to graduate was in June 1992.

== Curriculum ==
Ibn Khuldoon National School follows an American curriculum combined with the Bahrain syllabus in Arabic, Islamic studies, and Social studies. It also offers the International Baccalaureate (IB) option for students.

The school year extends from early September through the last week of June. It includes a minimum of one hundred and eighty days of instruction over two semesters. The instructional days are Sunday through Thursday.

== Accreditation ==
IKNS has been affiliated with the International Baccalaureate (IB) since the year 1990, as an IB diploma program provider. The first group of students sat for the IB diploma examinations in May 1992. In 1994, the school received its full accreditation from the Middle States Association of Colleges and Schools (MSA), and it continues to be in good standing with the association. Also in 1994, IKNS was involved in founding Middle East IB Association (MEIBA) during the 1994–95 academic year and has been affiliated with it since.

== Recent Events ==
In 2007, 113 students, including King Hamad's son Shaikh Khalid bin Hamad Al Khalifa, graduated from the school, with 47 achieving International Baccalaureates (IB), 27 graduating from the Honour Society, 11 with distinction, eight with high distinction, and three from the Student Congress.

Also in 2007, a team from the school won the 2006–2007 TradeQuest programme The Investment Trading Challenge, a simulated stock-trading programme.

In 2009, the school won the annual OnionBag Under-19 Girls Soccer Tournament in Dubai for the first time.

Every year, the school organizes several trips to countries abroad. Recent trips include Kenya in 2013, India in 2014, and China in 2015. These trips were organized in collaboration with a Canadian social enterprise called Me to We. Other trips include annual ski trips to Switzerland, annual Omrah trips to Mecca, annual trips to Jordan, and annual trips to Cyprus for students enrolled in Biology IB.

== See also ==
- List of educational institutions in Bahrain
