= Al Hekma International School =

- مدرسة الحكمة الدولية
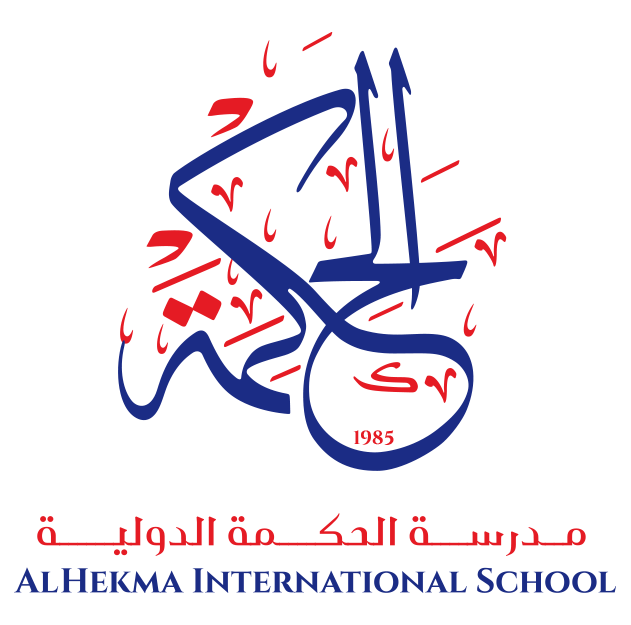

Location
- Sanad; Central Governorate; Bahrain; 26.1682°N 50.6022°E

Information
- School type: International Private
- Motto: Let Al Hekma Lead You To Success
- Opened: 1985
- Founder: Mona Al-Zayani
- Status: Open
- Director: Mr. Mohanned Khalid Al-Anni
- Key people: Ms. Rima Kaissi
- Grades: Kindergarten to Grade 12
- Gender: Co-educational
- Age range: 3 to 18
- Average class size: 24
- Hours in school day: From 7:00AM till 3:00PM
- Accreditation: MSA
- Address: Building No.1962, Road 4363, Sanad 743, Kingdom of Bahrain.
- Telephone: (+973) 17620820
- Fax: (+973) 17624800
- Website: www.alhekma.com

Al Hekma International School (AHIS) is a co-educational international school offering an American curriculum from pre-school to high school (PreK-12). Founded in 1985, the school is accredited by the Bahraini Ministry of Education and by two American accreditation organizations: the Middle States Association for Accreditation of Colleges & Schools (MSA) and North Central Association (NCA).

== See also ==
- List of educational institutions in Bahrain
