= Mona Al-Zayani =

Bahraini educator and politician

- منى الزياني

Nominated Member of the Consultative Council
- In office 2000–2002

Personal details
- Occupation: Educator and politician

Mona Rashid Al-Zayani (Arabic: منى الزياني) is a Bahraini educator and politician. In 2000 she was appointed to the Consultative Council, becoming one of its first female members.

== Biography ==
After completing a BA in English literacy at the University of Baghdad in Iraq, Al-Zayani earned a master of arts degree in curriculum and instruction at Norwich University a PhD degree in instruction from the University of Southern California instruction and curriculum in the United States. In 1985 she established the Al Hekma International School, serving as its president since its foundation.

In 2000 she was one of four women appointed to the Consultative Council by Emir Hamad bin Isa Al Khalifa, becoming its first female members. She remained a member until 2002.

In 2001 she was appointed director of the Bahraini branch of the Arab Open University, a role she held until 2003. In 2002 she became chairwoman of the new Gulf University.
