= Abdul Rahman Kanoo International School =

Coordinates: 26.179681°N 50.536773°E

- مدرسة عبدالرحمن كانو الدولية
- The Salmabad campus
- Salmabad; Bahrain (Bahrain) Salmabad; Bahrain

Information
- Type: Private
- Established: 1998; 28 years ago
- Founder: Abdul Rahman Kanoo
- Principal: Kate Moskwa
- Grades: Nursery to G12
- Enrollment: 1700
- Colours: Maroon, Beige
- Website: www.arkis.edu.bh

Abdul Rahman Kanoo International School (ARKIS; Arabic: مدرسة عبد الرحمن كانو الدولية) is a private school situated in Salmabad, Bahrain. Established in 1998, it is a co-educational and bilingual school with approximately 1,700 enrolled students. It is part of Abdul Rahman Kanoo Education (ARKEDU) education group.

== History ==
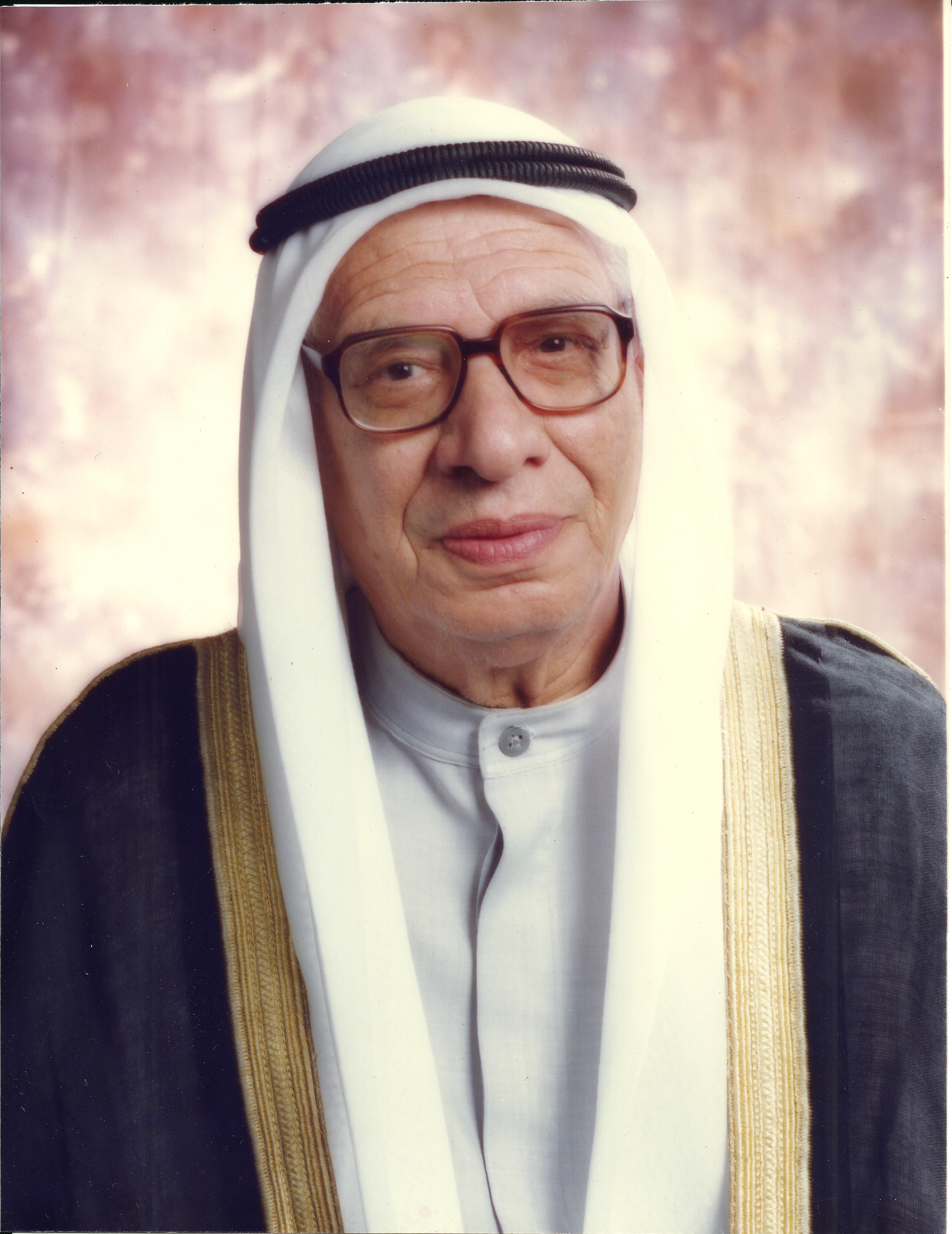
Abdul Rahman Kanoo, the school's founder

The school was founded in 1998 by Abdul Rahman Kanoo, with its initial campus being in the capital city Manama, and it later moved to Salmabad in 2005. The school became a registered International Baccalaureate centre in 2008. The languages of instruction are English and Arabic.

The school opened a second campus in Diyar Al Muharraq in 2023. In the same year, the school was chosen to host the national Bahrain Model United Nations in 2023. In 2024, the country's Education and Training Quality Authority rated the school as 'good with outstanding features'.

== See also ==
- List of educational institutions in Bahrain
