= Sacred Heart School (Bahrain) =

Location
- (Bahrain) Isa Town; Bahrain
- Coordinates: 26°9′31″N 50°32′19″E

Information
- Type: Private
- Motto: "Caritas et Veritas "
- Established: 1953
- Principal: Roselyn Thomas
- Vice-Principal: Regita Mary Nongrum
- Grades: LKG to Grade 12
- Gender: Co-educational
- Language: English
- Website: Official website

The Sacred Heart School is located in Isa Town, the Kingdom of Bahrain. The school was established in 1953 and offers a British education.

It is a co-educational school run by the Comboni Missionary Sisters from 1953 to 2003, and since then by the Apostolic Carmel Sisters, and offering an education to help prepare its students for the IGCSE examination - International General Certificate of Secondary Education - a London examinations curriculum, under the Pearson Edexcel board. The main language of instruction is English, while Arabic, French, Hindi or Filipino languages are offered as a mandatory second language option.

It is affiliated to the Sacred Heart Church, Manama, Bahrain.

== Notable alumni ==
- Jacqueline Fernandez, Miss Universe Sri Lanka 2006, actress and model

== See also ==
- List of educational institutions in Bahrain
