= Yara Salman =

Entrepreneur, businesswomen and socialite

- يارا سلمان
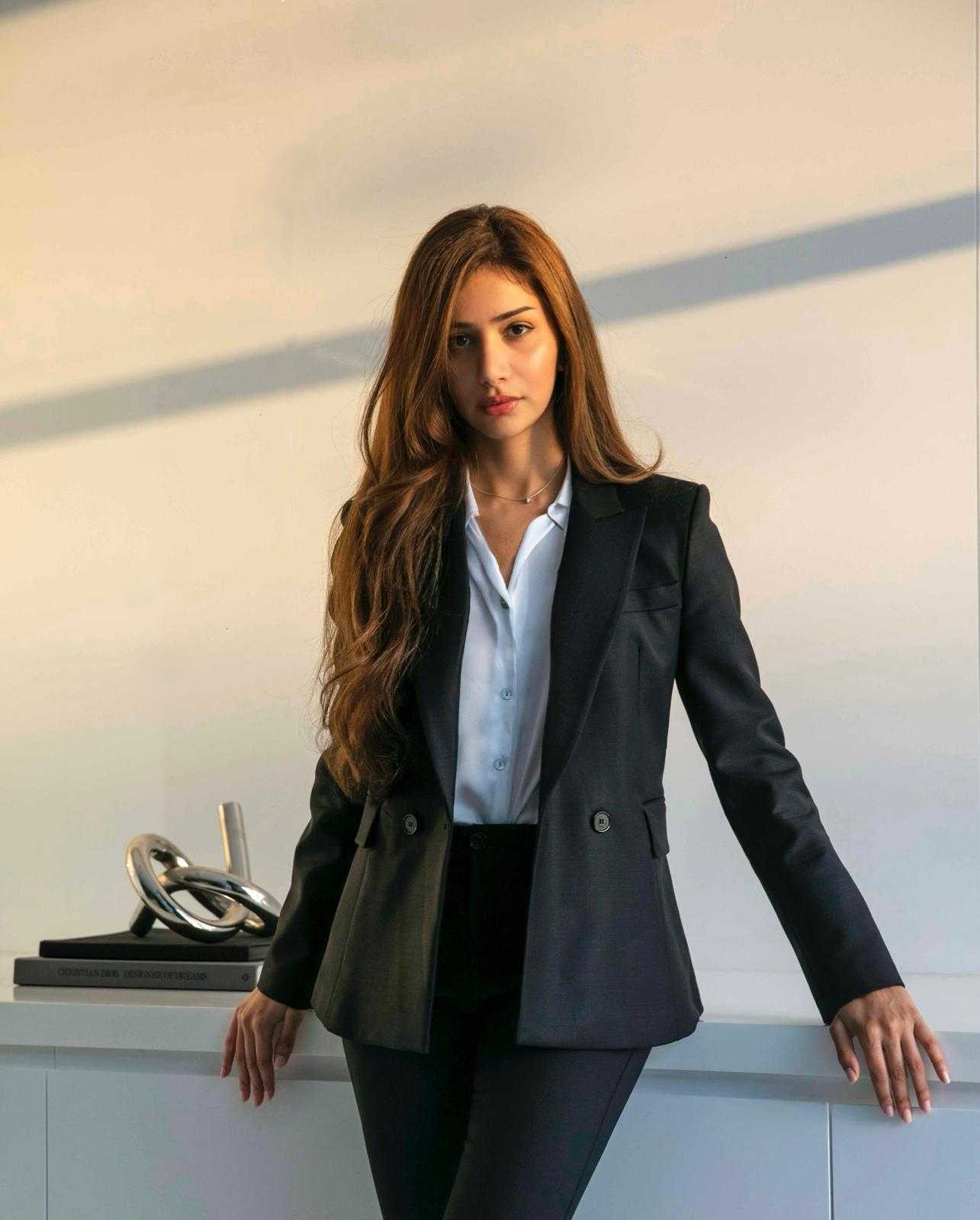
- Born: 16 August 1994 (age 31)
- Citizenship: Bahrain
- Education: University College of Bahrain; RCSI-Bahrain
- Occupation: Entrepreneur
- Awards: Young Entrepreneur of the Year - Bahrain Businesswomen's Society (2016)

Yara Salman (Arabic: يارا سلمان; born 16 August 1994) is a Bahraini businesswoman who started her business career by taking over the running of the food franchise Burger Land from her father at 17 years old. She then went on to found several beauty, hospitality, and entertainment enterprises. She is the first person to introduce cryotherapy to Bahrain, and in 2016 was the Bahrain Businesswomen's Society's Entrepreneur of the Year.

== Education ==
Born on 16 August 1994 to Jamil Ali Salman, a businessman, founder and president of the Jas Group, and Dr. Hala Al-Sayed, a dental consultant, Salman studied at St. Christopher's School in Bahrain before going on to receive her BA from University College of Bahrain with a degree in Public Relations. She then graduated with a Master of Business Administration degree from RCSI Bahrain.

== Career ==
In 2016, she consolidated her enterprises under the Jameel Salman Group to run all of her restaurants, real estate agencies, entertainment venues, and medical and beauty businesses.

=== Beauty salon ===
In 2012, Salman opened 'Yara Beauty Salon', a luxury beauty salon in Amwaj Islands in northern Bahrain. The salon beauty treatments include Moroccan baths, a solarium and cryo suites. Salman was the first to introduce cryotherapy to Bahrain to treat minor tissue damage and which is said to be "effective in cellulite reduction and calorie-burning".

=== Medical centre ===
In 2016, Salman established 'Hospitalia by Yara', a cosmetic medical centre that offers beauty and health services, where she is CEO. The centre has hyperbaric oxygen therapy as a part of their health tourism. In 2016, she introduced the region's first robotic pharmacy, 'Pharmacia by Yara', which operates as a service from 'Hospitalia by Yara'. In 2021, a second branch of 'Hospitalia' opened in Riffa. Her medical centre is not just for cosmetic medicine, but also dentistry and dermatological diseases.

=== Entertainment complex ===
Alongside her brother, Mohamed Salman, she is joint CEO of MJ's Bowling Lounge, an entertainment complex, which was opened by the rapper Omarion. Salman announced the opening of the complex in January 2016 and additional features including a 5 star restaurant, a coffee shop, and a karaoke venue.

=== Restaurants ===
At 17 Salman began to help her father as his assistant, she started running her father's fast food restaurant business, Burger Land, soon after graduation. In 2019 she made changes to the restaurant chain opening new locations and changing to a healthier menu. Four new Burger Land locations were opened in the following year and a restaurant was opened in Busaiteen. This restaurant was her father's idea and they removed meat from the menu and included vegan options that were representative of traditional foods in the Gulf countries, Pakistani cuisine and spicy foods.

== Awards ==
In 2016, Yara Salman was awarded the 2016 Entrepreneur of the Year award by the Bahrain Businesswomen's Society.
