= Robby Enthoven =

South African businessperson

- Born: Robert Adrian Graham Enthoven; 1968 (age 57–58); South Africa
- Known for: Managing Director of Nando's
- Parent: Dick Enthoven
- Relatives: Patrick Enthoven (uncle)

Robert Adrian Graham Enthoven is a South African businessman, managing director of the casual dining chicken chain, Nando's.

Robert Adrian Graham Enthoven has South African nationality. He is the son of the billionaire owner of Nando's, Dick Enthoven, and also goes by the name of Robert T'hooft, T'hooft being his mother's maiden name.

Robby Enthoven has been managing director of Nando's since 1993, when there were just two branches. As of 2018, there are over 400 restaurants in the UK.
