= University College of Bahrain =

University College of Bahrain كلية البحرين الجامعية
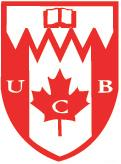
- Type: Private
- Established: 2002
- President: Sh. Dr. Khalid Bin Mohammed Al Khalifa
- Location: Saar, Bahrain
- Campus: Saar
- Affiliations: American University of Beirut (Lebanon),
- Website: http://www.ucb.edu.bh/

University College of Bahrain (UCB; Arabic: كلية البحرين الجامعية) is a private university located in Bahrain established in 2002. The university offers Programs in Business administration, Information Technology, and Graphic Design in addition to programs at Graduate level (MBA)

== Accreditation ==
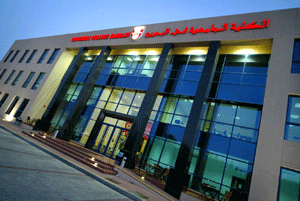
Saar Campus (UCB-Bahrain)

UCB is accredited and licensed by the Ministry of Education (Bahrain), UCB also receives academic support from the Regional External Programs / American University of Beirut.

A building on the University College of Bahrain's campus.

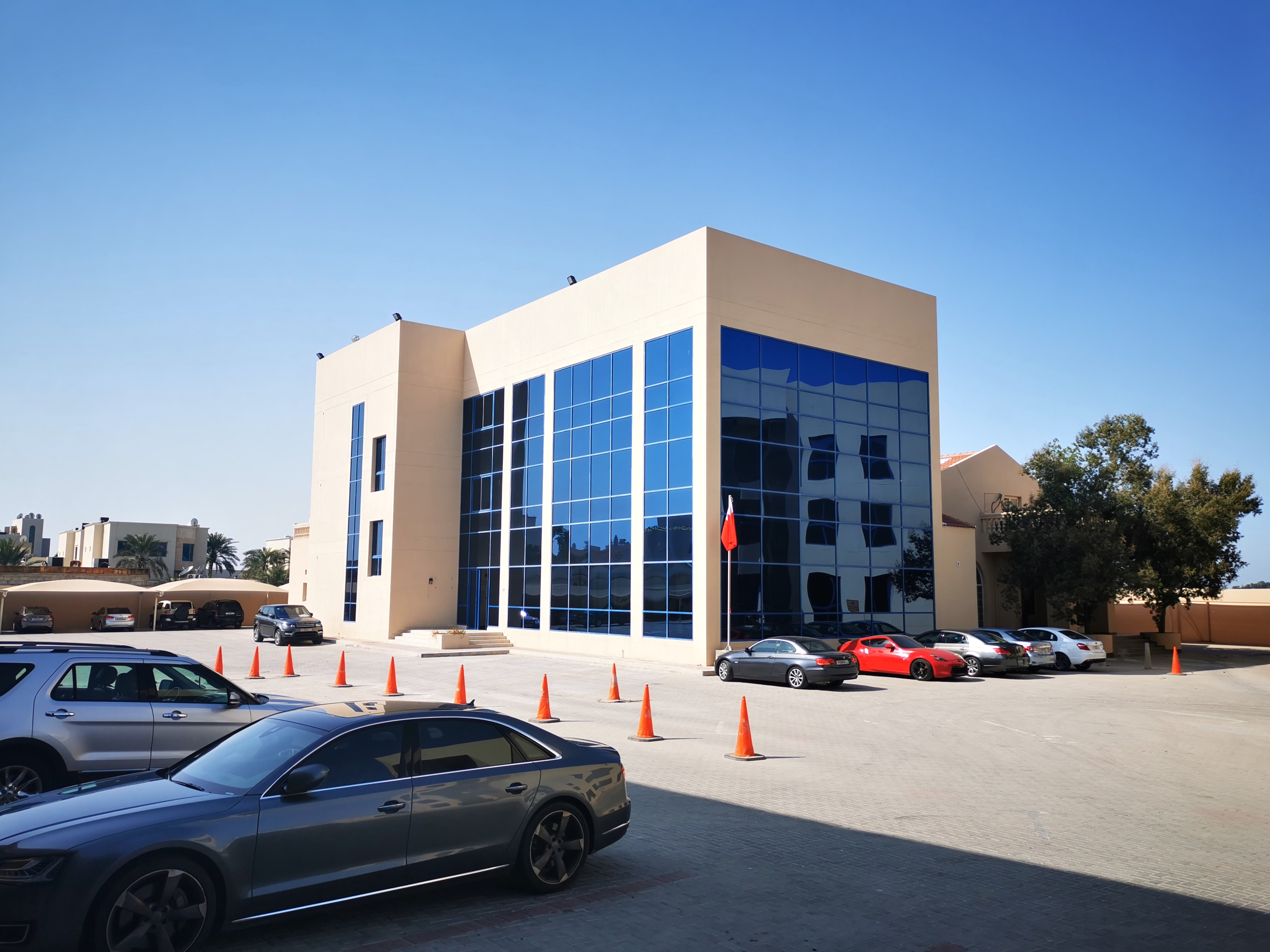
A building on UCB's campus.

== Academic programs ==
=== Undergraduate programs ===
==== Business ====
- B.Sc. in Accounting
- B.Sc. in Finance
- B.Sc. in Islamic finance
- B.Sc. in Engineering Management
- B.Sc. in Management
- B.Sc. in Marketing

==== Information Technology ====
- B.Sc. in MIS
- B.Sc. in Software Development
- B.Sc. in Computer Science

==== Media & Communication ====
- B.Sc. in Graphic Design
- B.Sc. in Multimedia
- B.Sc. in Public Relations

=== Graduate & Executive ===
- Evening MBA
- Executive Development
- MBA Islamic Finance

== Executives ==
- Sh. Dr. Khalid Bin Mohammed Al Khalifa (Founder, President and Vice Chairman of the Board University College of Bahrain & Lightspeed Communications)
- Sh. Saeeda A. Al Khalifa (Vice President of Administration)
- Sh. Ebrahim Bin Khalid Al Khalifa (executive director, Administration & Finance)
- Sh. Ali Bin Khalid Al Khalifa (executive director, Planning & Development)

== Notable alumni ==
- Yara Salman - food services and medical entrepreneur.

== See also ==
- List of universities in Bahrain
