= EtonHouse International Education Group =

Private school company headquartered in Singapore

- Asia

Information
- Type: International School
- Motto: Shaping the future through education
- Established: 12 March 1995; 31 years ago
- Founder: Ng Gim Choo
- Faculty: 5,000
- Age range: 9 Months - 18 Years
- Enrollment: 25,000
- Accreditation: International Primary Years Programme; International Baccalaureate; International General Certificate of Secondary Education
- Website: https://www.etonhouse.edu.sg/

EtonHouse International Education Group is headquartered in Singapore with more than 100 schools in over 9 countries. Together these schools provide education to over 25,000 children globally.

There are nine International Baccalaureate schools in the EtonHouse group.

== History ==
The first EtonHouse school was opened in Singapore in 1995 by Ng Gim Choo, who had been inspired by her observations as a parent of play-based preschools in London. Initially, the school had difficulty acquiring local staff due to a lack of educators with early-childhood education training and so brought in teachers from overseas. By 2010, the Group was earning $40 million a year with 26 schools across Asia with an emphasis on expanding into China.

The group managed alongside its regular institutions three main operations: EtonHouse, Middleton and E-Bridge, which offered education at lower fees in return for government priority in opening. High demand for registration created long lines and a requirement for revision to enrollment procedures. In October 2014, EtonHouse announced plans to open its first high school in cooperation with The Singapore Chinese Highschool, to be located in Bukit Timah, to be ready in 2016. The group also announced a partnership with Hwa Chong International to open a bilingual preschool/primary school in the same city. Due to laws in Singapore, while the preschool will be open for enrollment to everyone, the primary school will be international only, with Singaporean children taken only in exceptional circumstances.

The Group also announced its investment of $110mil in a China campus project in Deyang of Sichuan, China in 2017. The new campus will have a capacity of 5000 students and includes 3 campuses - a standalone kindergarten, a primary and secondary school, a kindergarten and high school campus as well as a teacher training centre.

In 2025, it was announced that the EtonHouse group would be opening two campuses in Riyadh, Saudi Arabia.
