= Dick Enthoven =

South African businessman (1937–2022)

- Born: Richard Enthoven; 1937; Johannesburg, South Africa
- Died: 2 December 2022 (aged 85)
- Occupation: Businessman
- Known for: Owner of Hollard Group, Nando's and Spier Wine Farm
- Children: 3, including Robby
- Relatives: Patrick Enthoven (brother)

Richard Enthoven (1937 – 2 December 2022) was a South African billionaire businessman who was the owner of the casual dining chain Nando's, the Hollard Group of insurance companies, and Spier Wine Farm.

== Early life ==
Richard Enthoven was the son of Robert Enthoven, a South African entrepreneur who "amassed an insurance fortune", with his company Robert Enthoven Insurance Brokers.

== Business interests ==
The Enthoven family owns Nando's casual dining chain, Spier Wine Farm and the Hollard Group of insurance companies. The family has a material ownership stake in the Telesure Group.

In March 2015, Bloomberg estimated his net worth at US$1.1 billion.

== Personal life and death ==
Enthoven had three children; Robby, Adrian, and Mariota. Robby Enthoven heads the UK operations for Nando’s. Adrian Enthoven was educated at Oxford University and is now the chairman of Hollard Group. Mariota Enthoven is married to Angus McIntosh and they run the Spier Biodynamic Farm.

Enthoven had a collection of 5,000 South African artworks.

Dick Enthoven died from cancer on 2 December 2022, at the age of 85.
