= Amwaj Islands =

Man-made islands in Bahrain

Amwaj Island
Native name: جزر أمواج (Arabic)
- Location within Bahrain

Geography
- Location: Persian Gulf
- Coordinates: 26.29°N 50.67°E
- Archipelago: Bahrain
- Adjacent to: Persian Gulf
- Total islands: 9
- Major islands: Amwaj; Najmah; Tala; Wardeh; Hamama; Dalphene; Farasha; Dilmuniya; Qassar Jurdi
- Area: 4.31 km^{2} (1.66 sq mi)
- Highest elevation: 0 m (0 ft)

Administration
- Bahrain
- Governorate: Muharraq Governorate
- Largest settlement: Floating City (pop. 6,000)

Demographics
- Demonym: Bahraini
- Population: 10,000 (2010)
- Pop. density: 2,320/km^{2} (6010/sq mi)
- Ethnic groups: Bahraini, non-Bahraini

Additional information
- Time zone: AST (UTC+3)
- ISO code: BH-15
- Official website: www.bahrain.com

Amwaj Islands (Arabic: جزر أمواج; transliterated: Juzur Amwaj) are a group of man-made islands, located in the Persian Gulf to the northeast of Bahrain, off the north coast of Muharraq Island. They lie 10.5 km (6.5 mi) northeast of the capital, Manama, on Bahrain Island.

== Geography ==
The nine islands of Amwaj Islands have a combined area of 4.31 km^{2}.

The Amwaj Islands were reclaimed from the relatively shallow seas to the northeast of Muharraq Island, which is the northernmost island in the Kingdom of Bahrain.

== History ==
In the year 2000, a plan was created for a pioneering project in Bahrain, the first to offer 100% freehold land ownership to expatriates living in the Kingdom of Bahrain, was devised; thus came the plan of Amwaj Islands. The plan was also to increase the supply of waterfront property which is in low supply in this small island nation. The project is being developed by Ossis Property Development with an investment of 1.5 billion US dollars. In 2002 the project started taking form. The first phase was completed in 2003. the second in 2004, when Cisco and Oracle began laying fabric for communications on the islands. At 2016, Amwaj Islands saw the completion of infrastructure such as electricity, roads, water, sewerage and telecoms, and became fit for residential use.

Over the past decade, a series of hotels have also opened on the island such as the Art Rotana, The Grove Hotel, Ramada Hotel and Suites, The Sea Loft and the Dragon Hotel. In 2012, entrepreneur Yara Salman opened 'Yara Beauty Salon', a luxury beauty salon in the islands. The salon features a variety of beauty treatments, including Moroccan baths, a solarium, and cryotherapy suites. Salman was the first to introduce the concept of cryotherapy to Bahrain, which is used to treat minor tissue damage and can be "effective in cellulite reduction and calorie-burning".

== Description ==
From an engineering perspective Amwaj introduced a number of new technologies to the region including geotubes for the reclamation phase of these islands, vacuum sewerage and fiber optic "Smart City" technology among others. The Islands contain residential, commercial (highrise) and hotel and retail buildings, as well as a 240 m diameter circular marina with over 140 berths.

== Administration ==
The island belongs to Muharraq Governorate.

== Transportation ==
Amwaj Islands are connected to Muharraq Island by two causeways, each about 1 km in length. The distance between the new island and Bahrain International Airport is only 4.5 km.

== Image gallery ==
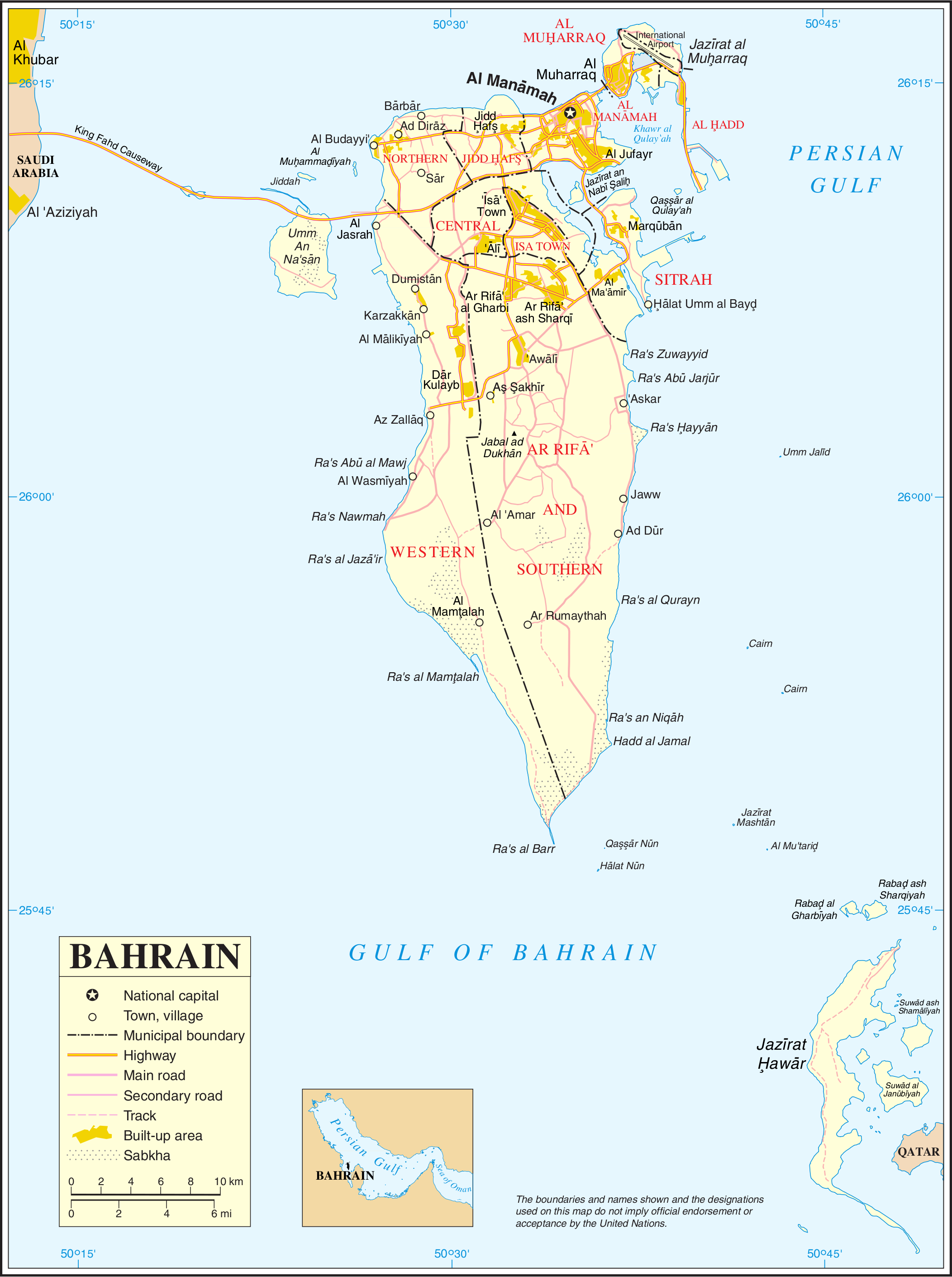
Map 1

District Map

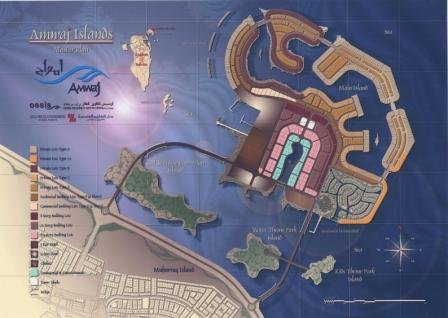
The plan of Amwaj Islands

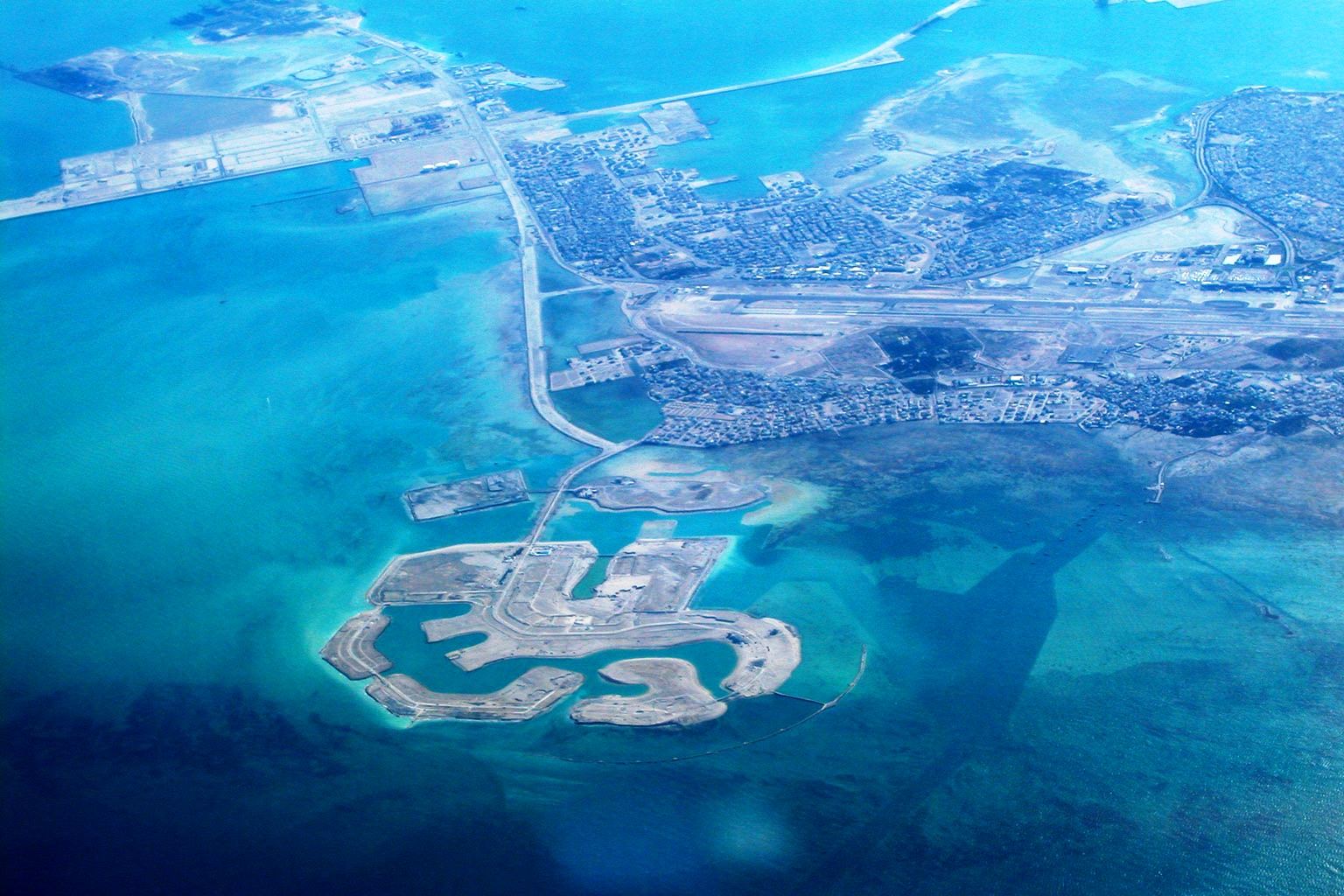
An aerial view of Amwaj Islands & Muharraq Island, looking towards the south.

== See also ==
- List of islands of Bahrain
