= Bahrain Bayan School =

Coordinates: 26.1614°N 50.5495°E

- Isa Town; Bahrain

Information
- Type: Private
- Established: 1982
- Grades: K-12
- Colors: Forest Green; White
- Website: Official website

Bahrain Bayan School (BBS, Arabic: مدرسة بيان البحرين, Madrasat Bayân al-Bahrain), based in Isa Town, Bahrain, is an independent, non-profit, co-educational, bilingual school in Arabic and English, offering preschool through grade 12. Accredited and licensed by the Bahrain Ministry of Education, under Bahraini law, the school provides an American-based and Arabic curriculum, as well as the International Baccalaureate diploma.

== History ==
BBS was established in 1982 by Dr. May Al Otaibi and Kathleen Acher Kaiksow in response to the need for a bilingual national school on the island of Bahrain. In its first year, the school served students from nursery to kindergarten with 40 students enrolled. The school now has around 1000 students.

In 1986, to accommodate the increasing enrollment, BBS relocated to its present site at the educational district in Isa Town, which was a piece of land granted by Sheikh Isa bin Salman Al Khalifa.

The school introduced to its first batch of senior students, college preparatory courses such as the International Baccalaureate program, and American Diploma to its high school students. In 1995, BBS gained its accreditation for Preschool to Grade 12. During the same year the school graduated its first senior class with a total of 21 students.

In the academic year of 2011-2012 the school celebrated its 30-year anniversary.

== Facilities ==
The school has a self-contained campus consisting of pre-school, primary, middle and high schools, administration, library, and cafeteria. It has a gymnasium/multi-purpose building, Mohammed Al Zamil Hall, which was built in 2001 and contains a 600-seat theater, two full-size basketball courts, two squash courts, an aerobic dance studio, weight training and fitness center. The school also has a building dedicated to Science and Technology studies.

The school was able to build a running track in 2011 donated by Batelco, with the support of the school's Board of Trustees and Parent Teacher Association.

== Gallery ==
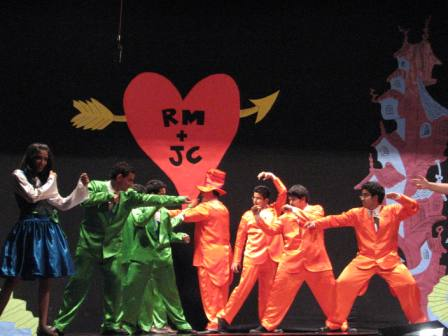
The Seusiffication of Romeo and Juliet play in June 2007

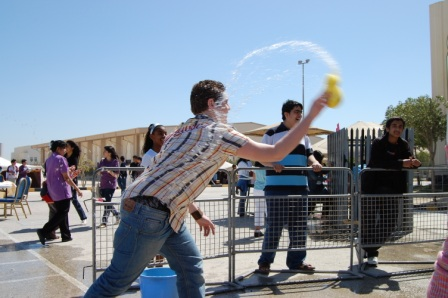
Funday Sponge Throw contest in 2008

== See also ==
- List of schools in Bahrain
