= Hollard Group =

South African insurance company

Hollard Insurance
- Company type: Privately owned
- Industry: Insurance
- Founded: 1980; 46 years ago
- Headquarters: Johannesburg, South Africa
- Key people: Willie Lategan (CEO)
- Number of employees: 2,350 (January 2019)
- Website: www.hollard.co.za

Hollard Group is a privately owned insurance group based in South Africa that operates under two insurance licences: short term and life. The company was established in 1980 by Robert Enthoven, and the Enthoven family retains the majority share, locally through The Enthoven Family Trust (EFT) and internationally through Capricorn Ventures International (CVI).

== History ==
Hollard was founded in 1980 by Robert Enthoven and his son Patrick Enthoven. In 1985, Patrick moved to California to work in the insurance business there.

Etana Insurance, launched in April 2008, was South Africa's only insurer to exclusively insure businesses. It was co-owned by Hollard (49.9%) and Etana Holdings (50.1%). More than 40% of Etana's management team was black in keeping with the company's commitment to racial equality. It was re-acquired by Hollard in 2013, and formed a division called Hollard Broker Markets.

The firm is known for the development of selling prepaid insurance, sold in cellphone-like ‘starter packs’ through retailers. It has been rated in the Top 10 in South African Best Company to Work For survey from 2002 to 2006 and was rated fifth in 2006; In 2007 to 2009 Hollard was rated in the Top 10 in South African Best Company to Work For survey’s Medium Category Winners.

== Social impact insurance ==
Hollard and Dalberg created HUGinsure the world's first Social Impact Insurance entity. This was done in association with Aon and the Lloyd’s market. It will create a specialized risk assessment entity that will measure and manage risks associated with the funding of social impact organizations. It will apply tested rating methodologies and risk management principles to facilitate the underwriting of social impact funding. HUGinsure’s service will help funders assess the credit worthiness of social projects and organizations so they can deploy capital with confidence, accelerating the timely flow of funds to social organizations and preventing disruptions in their operations and impact. HUGinsure expects to accelerate over $400 million towards global development efforts by 2018. HUGinsure was launched at the Clinton Global Initiative in New York In September 2013.

Social Impact Insurance (SII) refers to insurance products and services designed to generate measurable social and environmental benefits alongside financial returns. Similar to social impact investing, SII addresses specific developmental, social, or environmental challenges in both emerging and developed markets.

Impact Insurers are primarily distinguished by their intention to address social and environmental challenges through the provision of insurance coverage. For example, criteria to evaluate the positive social and/or environmental outcomes of investments or project that may benefit from insurance coverage are an integrated component of the underwriting processes.

Social Impact Insurance can be in the form of insurance including Credit, Marine, Property Damage, Engineering and Construction, Liability, and Life Insurance.

== Globalisation ==
The firm is the largest independent and privately owned insurer in South Africa and has operations and investments in Namibia, Mozambique, Botswana, Australia, India, Pakistan, China, Ghana and the United Kingdom. In 2015 Hollard Investments invested 6 million in OpenAgent and in 2016 made a similar sized investment in Huddle Insurance. Its Ghana subsidiary was named the Best Organization in Employee Branding at the HR Focus Conference and Awards held at the Accra International Conference Center
