= Salmabad =

Town in central Bahrain

Coordinates: 26°11′N 50°31′E

Salmabad is a town in Bahrain. It lies west of Isa Town, in central Bahrain.

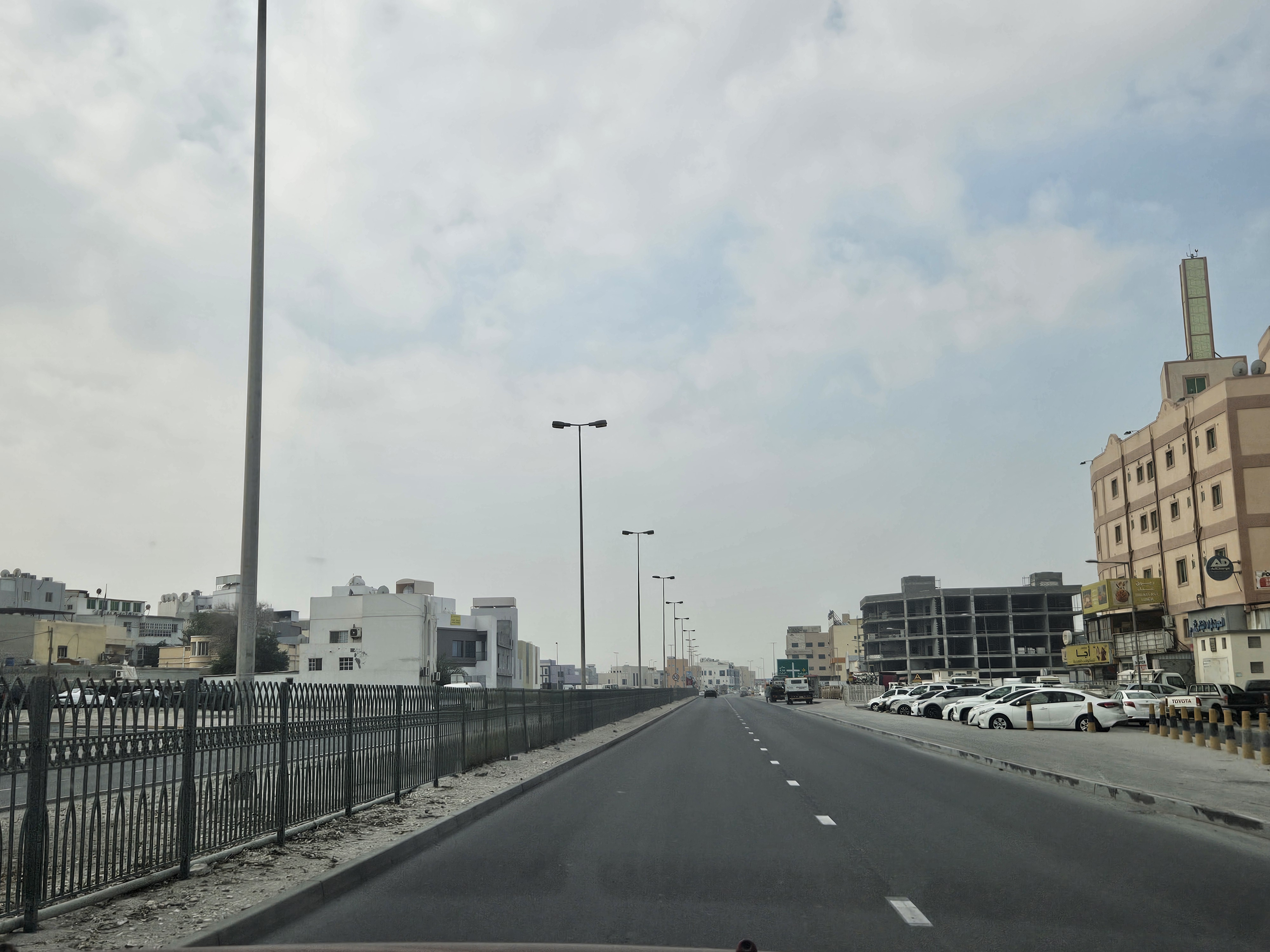
A dual carriageway in Salmabad

== Geography ==
The Shaikh Salman Highway, which connects Salmabad and Isa Town to the capital city Manama, is frequently the scene of traffic congestion. In 2024, a new traffic redevelopment project of the highway was announced to reduce congestion in the area.

Many businesses and factories are located in the Salmabad area. It has been developed as an industrial area in Bahrain. It is also the site of educational institutions such as the Abdulrahman Kanoo International School and the University of Technology Bahrain.

The area has also been listed as a future site for a railway station in Bahrain's planned light rail network.
