= Sar, Bahrain =

Saar سار
- Town
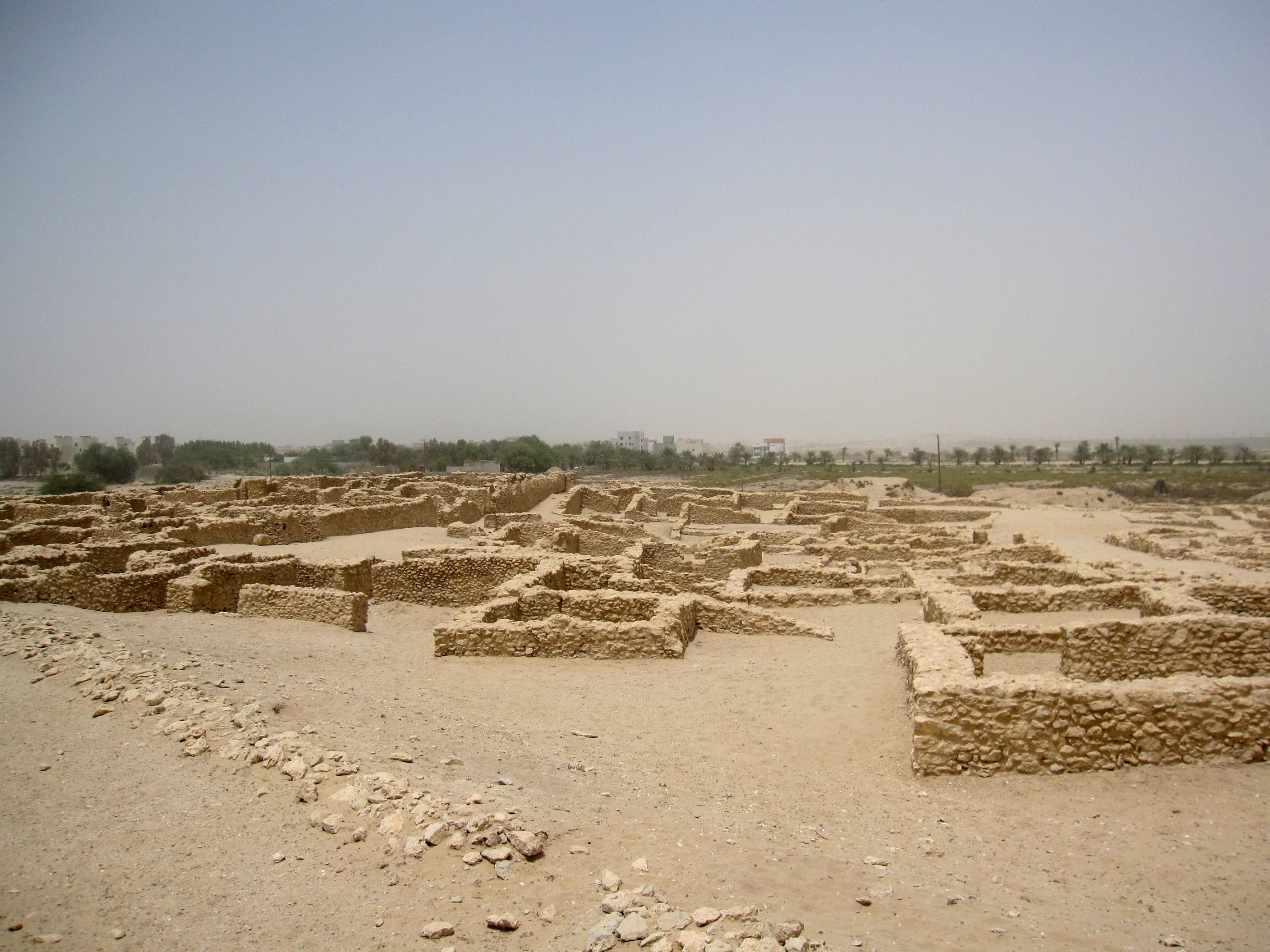
- Dilmun era settlement, located on the outskirts of Saar

- Location in Bahrain
- Coordinates: 26°11′48″N 50°29′08″E
- Country: Bahrain
- Governorate: Northern Governorate

Sar or Saar (Arabic: سار) is a residential town in Bahrain, to the west of the capital, Manama. It is known for its beautiful landscaping and greenery.

== Education ==
1. St. Christopher's School
2. University College of Bahrain
3. Al Mahd Day Boarding School
4. The Budaiya Pre-School
5. Saar Nursery

Closed:

- The Japanese School in Bahrain

== Agriculture ==
The northern governorate of the Kingdom contains fertile land which contributes to Saar's lush green environment. Agriculture had a main economic factor in Baharin's growth.

The University College of Bahrain has a campus in Saar.

== History ==
Saar is the site of a temple, known as "Saar Temple", built during the Dilmun era of Bahrain's history. The temple was believed to have played an important role in marking the summer solstice.

=== Archaeology ===
The Dilmun era settlement of Saar was discovered on a survey in 1977, and excavated in 1977-1979 under the direction of M. Ibrahim. Some unpublished work by a joint Bahraini-Jordanian expedition at Sarr in the 1980s. The site covers about 2.5 hectares in area. The London-Bahrain Archaeological Expedition was conducted at Saar between 1990 and 1999, led by Robert Killick, Jane Moon and Harriet Crawford.

=== Artifacts from Saar ===
Artifacts found within the households include copper fishhooks, bitumen nodules, and numerous shells from shellfish, including pearl oyster. The copper was produced in Bahrain; the bitumen imported from Mesopotamian quarry sites. Tiny seed pearls were found in the excavations, although they were probably too small to be used as ornaments. Several hundred seals, used to seal packages, bales and jars, have been found at the Saar settlement, and 48 seals from the associated burial ground: this is very unusual for a small town and unmatched on Bahrain. Four or five seals were found in a single house. All of the seals are of the early Dilmun style circa 2050 BC to 1800 BC.
