= Patrick Enthoven =

South American insurance broker

- Born: Patrick Robert Enthoven; 1943 or 1944 (age 81–82); South Africa
- Education: University of Cape Town
- Known for: Founder of Hollard Group
- Spouse: Sally Enthoven
- Children: 3
- Relatives: Dick Enthoven (brother)

Patrick Robert Enthoven (born 1943/1944) is a South African insurance broker, the founder and former chairman of Hollard Group, South Africa's largest privately owned insurance group.

== Early life ==
Patrick Robert Enthoven was born circa 1943/1944. He has a BA degree from the University of Cape Town.

== Career ==
Enthoven founded Hollard in 1980, and named it after Hollard Street in Johannesburg, which was where the stock exchange was based, "We thought it added just a little bit of respectability."

In 2011, his son Dick Enthoven succeeded him as chairman of Hollard Group.
