= Michael David Kirchmann =

American real estate developer, architect, and designer

- Born: July 5, 1972 (age 54); Johannesburg; South Africa
- Education: University of Cape Town; New York University
- Occupation: Architect
- Practice: GDSNY; GDS Development
- Website: gdsny.com

Michael David Kirchmann is an American architect, real estate developer, and co-founder of GDSNY. Kirchmann and his firm specialize in New York City based projects including the Dogpound gym and 25 Mercer Street.

== Career ==
In 1997, Kirchmann joined SOM in New York City, where he became a Director of the New York office. During his time at SOM, he completed projects including the Park Hotel in Hyderabad, the first LEED Platinum certified hotel in India.

In 2007, Kirchmann founded GDSNY, a real estate development and architecture firm in New York.

He has taught in the Master of Science in Real Estate Development program at Columbia Graduate School of Architecture, Planning and Preservation.

== Projects ==
Kirchmann has designed low-income housing in New York City, including the redevelopment at Arverne View (formerly known as Ocean Village) in Rockaway, Queens, a region that was devastated by Hurricane Sandy in 2012.

In 2015, Kirchmann designed the façade renovation of Marcus Garvey Village, which sits across nine city blocks in the Brownsville section of Brooklyn. Originally designed in 1973 by Kenneth Frampton, the project achieved notability at the time for its approach to low-rise, high-density affordable housing. The project received the Building Brooklyn Award for Affordable Housing Preservation and the Affordable Housing Magazine Award of Excellence.

In 2016 Kirchmann collaborated with Fabien Baron to design the Dogpound, an exclusive gym located in the West Village.

Kirchmann appeared in the 2017 season of Bravo’s Million Dollar Listing New York with real estate broker Fredrik Eklund, who shows several units from Kirchmann's development at 25 Mercer Street.

In developing 25 Mercer, a condominium, Kirchmann worked with visual artist Shantell Martin, light artist Matthew Schreiber, and fashion photographer Nigel Barker.

Kirchmann developed and designed The Emerson, a mixed-use development adjacent to the High Line.

Kirchmann’s office buildings include 1245 Broadway, a property in the NoMad section of New York City whose tenants include the headquarters of film studio A24 Films, and 322-326 Seventh Avenue (known as “28&7”) in Chelsea.

Kirchmann designed the master plan for Bahrain Bay, a residential and commercial district in Bahrain.
