= List of tallest structures in Bahrain =

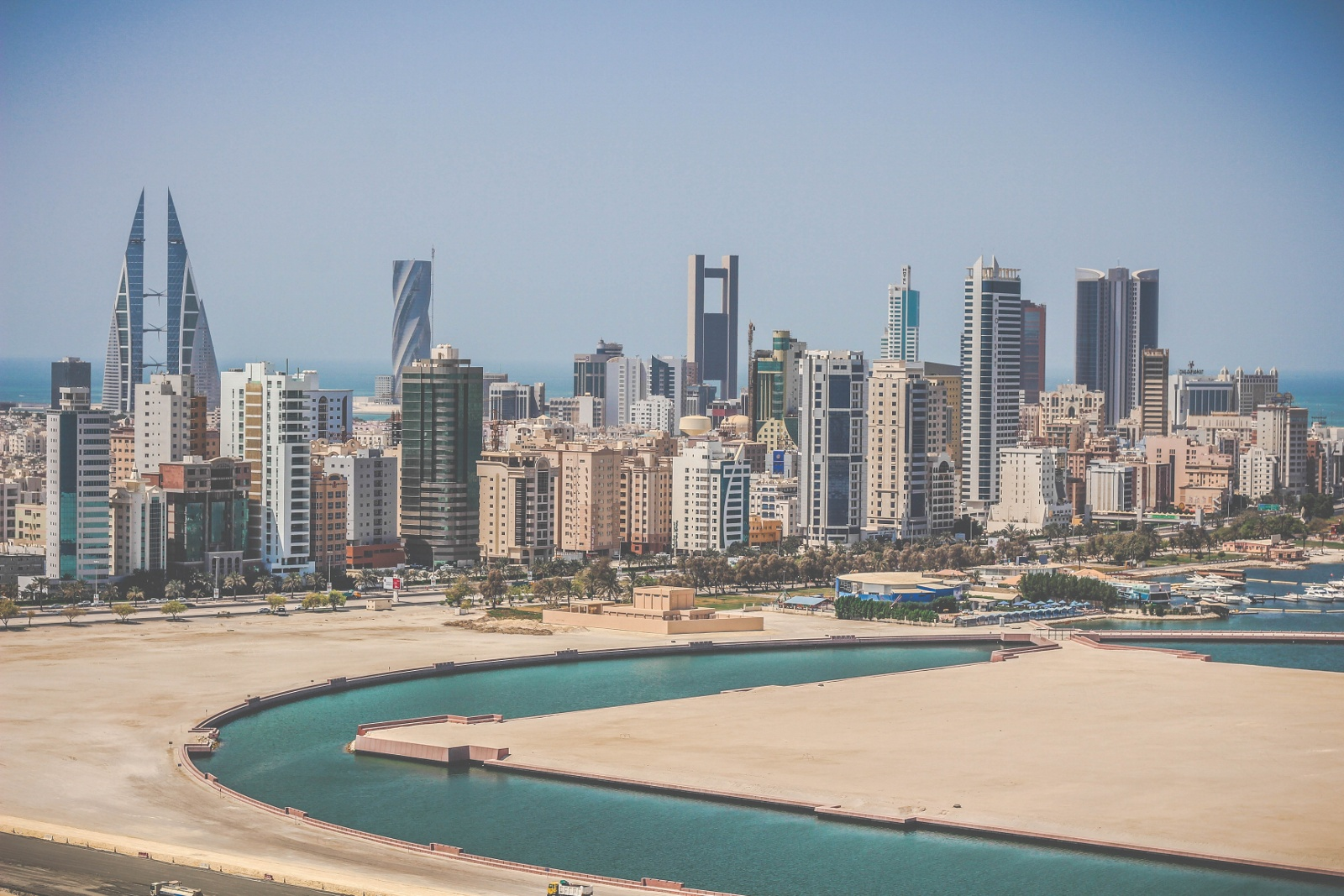
Skyline of Manama in December 2014

The following tables list all the tallest buildings and structures in Bahrain. The list ranks the 25 tallest buildings in Bahrain by their maximum height in meters. The current tallest building in Bahrain is the Four Seasons Hotel Bahrain Bay , at 269.7 meters tall and 50 stories, which opened in 2015.

== List of tallest buildings ==
Was the tallest building in Belarus upon completion
Architecturally topped out but not yet completed

Most of Bahrain's skyscrapers and tall buildings are located in its capital, Manama. Although areas near Manama are often included there, such as suburbs or outer districts such as Seef, they are shown here as separate cities. Most of these buildings and structures are located in the capital of Manama. Buildings with fewer than 30 floors, and structures shorter than 100 m (330 ft), are not included.

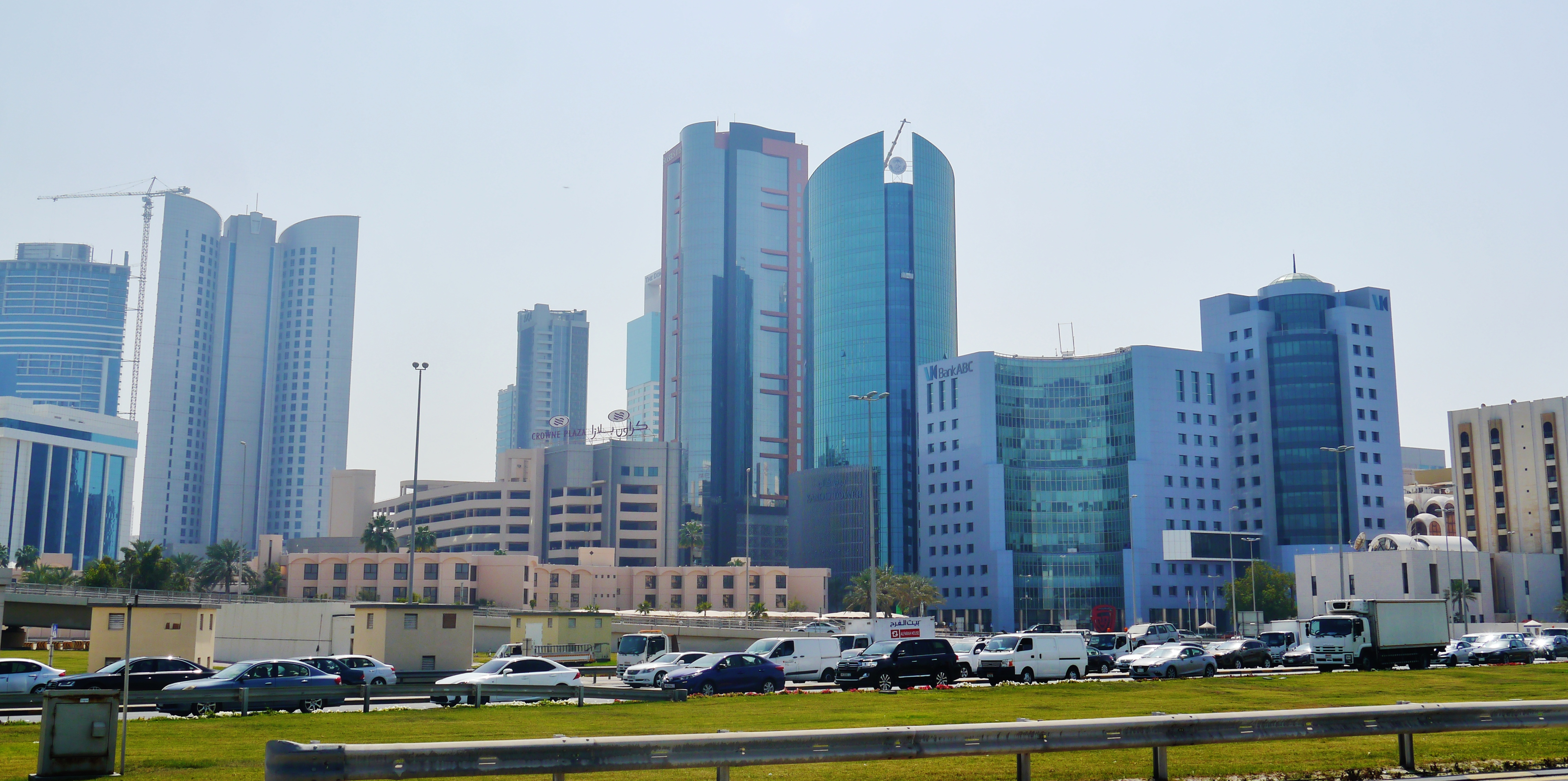
JUFFAIR SKYLINE

Rank	Name	Image	Location	Year	Height m (ft)	Floors	Notes	Reference
1	Four Seasons Hotel Manama		Bahrain Bay; 26.24715°N 50.58189°E	2015	269.7 m (885 ft)	50	Tallest building in Bahrain; 12th tallest hotel in the world.	
2	Bahrain Financial Harbour		Manama; 26°14′16″N 50°34′24″E	2009	260 m (850 ft)	53	Tallest buildings in Bahrain between 2009 and 2015.	
3	Bahrain World Trade Center		Manama; 26°14′21″N 50°34′53″E	2008	240 m (790 ft)	50	Tallest buildings in Bahrain between 2008 and 2009.	
4	Golden Gate Skyline Tower A		Bahrain Bay; 26.24851°N 50.57706°E	2025	235 m (771 ft)	58		
5	Al Tijaria Tower/ Symphony Tower		Manama; 26.23998°N 50.59358°E	2022	230 m (750 ft)	50		
6	Villamar Tower A		Manama; 26.24137°N 50.57356°E	2021	220 m (720 ft)	54		
7	Villamar Tower C		Manama; 26.24137°N 50.57356°E	2021	210 m (690 ft)	54		
8	Era Tower		Seef; 26.23650°N 50.54973°E	2012	200 m (660 ft)	51		
9	United Tower		Bahrain Bay; 26.25016°N 50.57923°E	2016	189.2 m (621 ft)	48		
10	Abraj Al Lulu Pearl Towers		Manama; 26°13′48″N 50°33′32″E	2009	180 m (590 ft)	50		
11	Sukoon Tower		Manama; 26.22358°N 50.60904°E	2017	180 m (590 ft)	45		
12	Almoayyed Tower		Seef; 26°14′09″N 50°32′31″E	2004	172 m (564 ft)	47	Tallest building in Bahrain between 2004 and 2008.	
13	Abraj Al Lulu Black Pearl		Manama; 26°13′48″N 50°33′32″E	2008	160 m (520 ft)	40		
14	Diplomat Commercial Office Tower		Manama; 26.24119°N 50.59195°E	2012	157.6 m (517 ft)	36		
15	Era View Tower		Gudaibiya; 26.22807°N 50.59814°E	2018	150 m (490 ft)	37		
16	Orchid Dream Towers		Sanabis; 26.23015°N 50.54982°E	2012	139.8 m (459 ft)	36		
17	National Bank of Bahrain Building		Manama; 26.23610°N 50.57721°E	1998	100.9 m (331 ft)	27	Tallest building in Bahrain between 1998 and 2004.	
18	Trust Insurance Company Office Tower		Manama; 26.24088°N 50.58621°E	2008	98 m (322 ft)	25		

Name	Highest floor	City	Primary use	Completion
Harbour Heights Tower A	54	Manama	Residential	2021
Harbour Heights Tower C	52	Manama	Residential	2021
Orchid Plaza	47	Juffair	Residential	2019
S Plaza Suites Hotel	47	Al Seef	Hotel	2020
Fontana Infinity 1	46	Juffair	Residential	2021
Fontana Infinity 2	45	Juffair	Residential	2021
Onyx Rotana 2	44	Bahrain Bay, Manama	Residential	2024
Hilton City Centre Tower A	43	Al Seef	Hotel	2020
Hilton City Centre Tower B	43	Al Seef	Hotel	2020
Somewhere Residence	42	Manama	Residential	2025
Forbes Tower	42	Al Seef	Commercial	2018
Spiral Orchid Residence	41	Manama	Residential	2022
Burj Kadi	40	Juffair	Residential	2022
Fontana Gardens 1	39	Juffair	Residential	2016
Fontana Gardens 2	39	Juffair	Residential	2016
Onyx Rotana 1	39	Bahrain Bay, Manama	Residential	2024
Orange Suites Hotel	37	Juffair	Hotel	2015
Dream Tower 1	36	Seef	Residential	2012
Dream Tower 2	36	Seef	Residential	2012
Catamaran Tower 1	36	Seef	Residential	2020
The Domain Hotel and Spa	36	Manama	Hotel	2013
Landmark 34	35	Al Hidd	Residential	2022
The Breaker	35	Al Seef	Residential	2015
Riviera Plaza 3	35	Al Fateh, Al Juffair.	Residential	2018
Orange Suites Residence	34	Juffair	Residential	2016
Catamaran Tower 2	34	Seef	Residential	2020
Ventura Tower	34	Manama	Residential	2021
Memaar Tower	34	Juffair	Commertial	2018
The Grand Tower	33	Seef	Residential	2016
RP Tower	33	Juffair	Residential	2019
Fortune Tower	33	Juffair	Residential	2010
Alnajjar Tower	32	Juffair	Residential	2020
Fontana Towers 1	32	Juffair	Residential	2012
Fontana Towers 2	32	Juffair	Residential	2012
Holiday Villa Hotel	32	Manama	Hotel	2013
Amfa Tower 3	32	Seef	Residential	2019
Fontana Suites	32	Juffair	Residential	2017
Swiss-Belsuites Admiral	30	Juffair	Residential	2019
Avare Tower	30	Sanabis	Residential	2008
Fakhro Tower	30	Seef, Manama	Commercial	2013
Seef Avenue II	30	Seef	Residential	2024
Fraser Suites Diplomatic Area	30	Manama	Hotel	2015
Era58	30	Manama	Commercial	2020
Fontana Gardens 3	30	Juffair	Residential	2016

== List of tallest structures ==
Rank	Name	Height	City	Primary use	Completion
1	N/A	N/A	N/A	N/A	N/A

== List of tallest buildings under construction ==
Name	Highest floor	City	Primary use	Assumed completion
Golden Gate Tower B	58	Bahrain Bay, Manama	Residential	2026
Onyx Sky View	53	Bahrain Bay, Manama	Residential	2027
Kadi Eco Tower	51	Juffair	Residential	2027
Golden Gate Tower A	49	Bahrain Bay, Manama	Residential	2026
Orchid Bahrain Bay	47	Bahrain Bay, Manama	Residential	2028
Symphony Tower	46	Manama	Commercial	2026
Onyx Water Garden 1	46	Seef	Residential	2028
FGR Tower	38	Manama	Commercial	2026
Catamaran Verandas	32	Seef	Residential	2026
Sumo Tower	32	Seef	Commercial	2026
HLG Offices	31	Seef	Commercial	2026
Onyx Water Garden 2	30	Seef	Residential	2028

== See also ==
- List of tallest buildings and structures in the world
- List of twin structures
- Pearl Monument, an iconic structure in Bahrain.
