= Abraj Al Lulu =

- The Abraj Lulu Pearl Towers

General information
- Status: Completed
- Type: Residential
- Location: Manama, Bahrain
- Coordinates: 26°13′48″N 50°33′32″E
- Topped-out: March 2008
- Completed: May 2009
- Cost: USD $ 250 million
- Owner: PREDC
- Operator: PREDC

Height
- Architectural: Gold Pearl Tower: 180 m (590 ft); Silver Pearl Tower: 180 m (590 ft); Black Pearl Tower: 160 m (520 ft)

Technical details
- Floor count: Gold Pearl Tower: 50; Silver Pearl Tower: 50; Black Pearl Tower: 40

Design and construction
- Architect: Jafar Tukan
- Main contractor: HCC

The Abraj Al Lulu, also known as the Pearl Towers, is a large residential project located in Manama, the capital city of Bahrain. The project consists of three large towers, two of which have 50 floors each and one has 40. The three towers (Gold Pearl, Silver Pearl and the Black Pearl) are located next to the King Faisal Highway, which is close to iconic landmarks such as the NBB Tower, Bahrain WTC and the Bahrain Financial Harbor, and is adjacent to the site of the former Pearl Roundabout. The entire project covers a land area of 18,580 m^{2} (200,000 sq ft).

== Design ==
Abraj Al Lulu was constructed by the Al Hamad Contracting Company, and was designed jointly by a group of architects; Jafar Tukan, Cowi Al Moayed and local architect Habib Mudara.

The complex, completed in May 2009, can accommodate over 1,100 cars in its four-storey parking lot, and consists of over 860 luxury 1-to-3 bedroom apartments. The skyscrapers of Abraj Al Lulu is one of the many tall buildings of the Manama skyline.

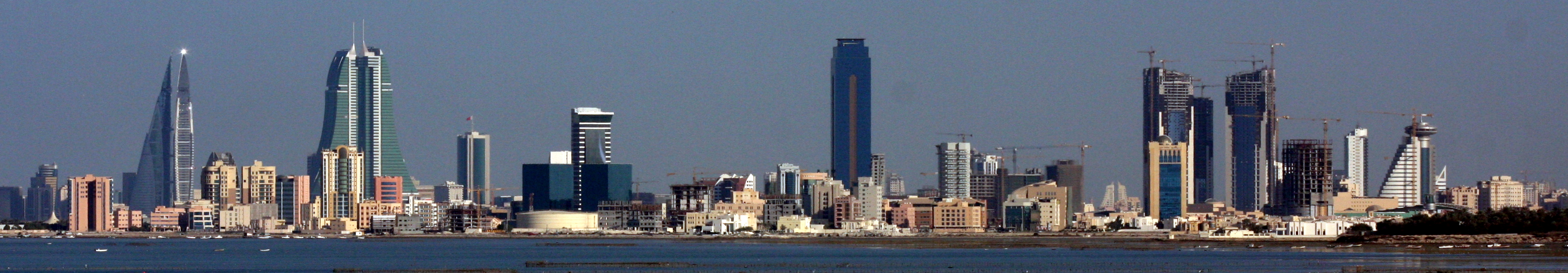
A panoramic view of the combined skylines of Manama and Seef. From left to right:
1. The twin towers of the Bahrain WTC.
2. The twin towers of the Bahrain Financial Harbor (BFH).
3. The NBB tower (short building next to BFH).
4. The Almoayyed Tower (tallest in the photo, center of image).
5. The Abraj Al Lulu residential project (three towers, the third tower being somewhat obscured, under-construction on the far-right).

== See also ==
- List of tallest structures in Bahrain
- List of twin buildings and structures
