= Qasim Fakhro =

Bahraini politician (1934–2017)

- قاسم فخرو

Member of the Consultative Council of Bahrain
- In office 1993–1996
- Monarch: Isa bin Salman Al Khalifa
- Prime Minister: Khalifa bin Salman Al Khalifa

Personal details
- Born: Qasim Mohamed Yousif Abdulrahman Abdullah Hasan Mahmoud Fakhro; 1934 Muharraq
- Died: January 13, 2017 (aged 82–83) A'ali
- Resting place: Muharraq Cemetery
- Children: Ghassan, Tariq, Muna, Fatima
- Education: American University in Cairo
- Occupation: merchant

Qasim Mohamed Yousif Abdulrahman Abdullah Hasan Mahmoud Fakhro (born in 1934, Arabic: قاسم محمد يوسف عبد الرحمن عبد الله حسن محمود فخرو, Muharraq, - January 13, 2017 (aged 82–83), A'ali) was a Bahraini merchant and politician. He was sworn into the Council of Representatives on December 12, 2018, for the seventh district of Muharraq Governorate.

== Early life and education ==
Fakhro was born in 1934 in Muharraq, Bahrain, to Mohamed Yousif Fakhro, the son of famed merchant Yousif bin Abdulrahman Fakhro. He studied at the American University of Beirut from 1950 to 1953. He then enrolled at the American University in Cairo, graduating in 1957.

== Commercial career ==
Fakhro joined the family business, the Fakhro Group, also establishing many other public and private companies. He served as Chairman of the Board of Directors of several public joint-stock companies such as the Bahrain Tourism Company and the Bahrain National Insurance Company. In addition, he served on the boards of Ahli United Bank, Bahrain Cinema Company, and others.

== Political career ==
Fakhro served in public office as the vice-president of the Central Municipal Public Authority, the forerunner of the current Ministry of Works in the 1970s. He was a member and deputy chairman of the first session of the Consultative Council from 1993 to 1996. He was the first Chairman of the Board of Directors of the Central Bank of Bahrain when that institution was founded in 2006.

== Death ==
Fakhro died on January 13, 2017, and was buried the following day in Muharraq Cemetery.

== Personal life ==
He was married to Farida bint Mohammed Abdulla Juma and had four children: Ghassan, Tariq, Muna, and Fatima.
