= Almoayyed Tower =

Record height
- Preceded by: Abraj Al Lulu (Tower: 3)

General information
- Location: Manama, Bahrain
- Coordinates: 26°14′09″N 50°32′31″E
- Construction started: 2001
- Completed: 2004
- Cost: US$53,000,000
- Operator: (Bahrain) YK Almoayyed & Sons

Height
- Roof: 172 m (564 ft)
- Top floor: 42

Technical details
- Floor count: 47
- Floor area: 48,400 m^{2} (520,973 sq ft)
- Lifts/elevators: 7

Design and construction
- Architects: (United Arab Emirates) Shadid EC, (Bahrain) Mazen Al-Umran C.E.
- Main contractor: (United Arab Emirates) Fujairah NCC

Almoayyed Tower (also known as: Dark Tower), is a commercial skyscraper located in the Seef neighborhood of the Bahraini capital Manama. The tower is a regular four-sided structure, with a height of 172 metres (564 ft). Almoayyed consists mostly of office and business complexes. It was the tallest tower in Bahrain until the Bahrain Financial Harbour, Bahrain WTC, and the Abraj Al Lulu were constructed. Almoayyed Tower is also known as Dark Tower because of its dark colouring.

== Structure ==
The entire construction process was divided into two Phases. Phase-1 was the construction of the tower itself, and Phase-2 was the construction of the eight-storey car park, which can accommodate over 1000 cars. The first Phase was completed in November 2003, and the second Phase was completed in 2004. Almoayyed was the tallest structure in Bahrain from 2001 until 2008, standing over 172 metres (564 ft) tall, with 42 floors and 6 public elevators, and a total floor space of 48,400 square metres (520,973 sq ft). Almoayyed is built on a 2,024 m^{2} (21,786 sq ft) footprint area and is the first building in Bahrain to possess a private helipad, which is built on the top of the building.

== Facilities ==
Almoayyed Tower offers retail space covering its 'Mall' which encompasses the ground and mezzanine floors and has a separate entrance on the north side of the structure. The building has booster antennas from all the major telecom providers in Bahrain, meaning that signal is not lost whilst in one of the 6 elevators. The 43rd floor offers space for antennas; given Almoayyed Tower's large size relative to all other buildings in the Al Seef District, it has been a hub for telecom providers to place their antennas on Almoayyed Tower to give better reception to the rest of Manama.

== Management ==
Almoayyed Tower is managed by the owners of the building, YK Almoayyed & Sons Properties Co WLL.

== See also ==
- List of tallest structures in Bahrain
