= Abdulla Adel Fakhro =

Bahraini businessman and politician

His Excellency Abdulla Adel Fakhro
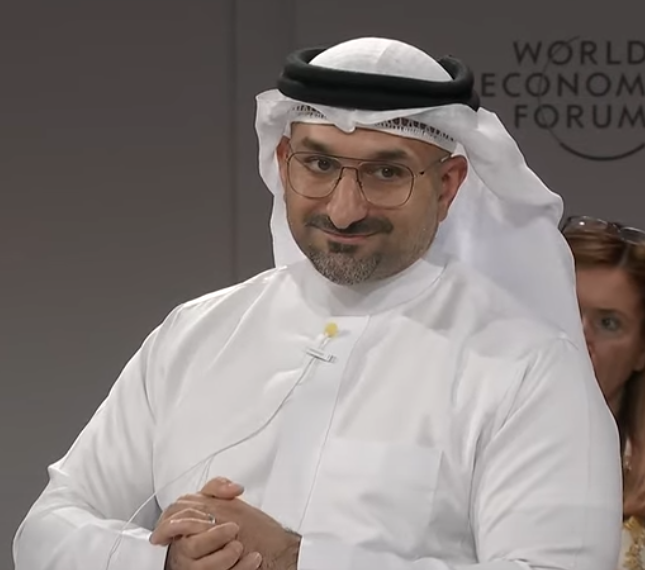
- At a WEF special meeting in 2024

Minister of Industry and Commerce of Bahrain
- Incumbent
- Assumed office November 21, 2022

Personal details
- Occupation: Businessman; politician

Abdulla Adel Fakhro is a Bahraini businessman and politician currently serving as Minister of Industry and Commerce. He was a member of the Board of Directors of Bahrain Chamber of Commerce and Industry.

== Career ==
Abdulla Adel Fakhro, a member of a prominent Bahraini business family, spent 20 years in his family's business Fakhro Group, rising through the ranks to executive positions. He served as a director of Fakhro Restaurants Company (McDonald's Bahrain), Abdulla YousifFakhro Group, Lotus Investment Company, and GAC Bahrain. He is the founder of Summit 7 Holding with interest in hospitality, floating structures, sports and arts. After leaving his family's business for politics, he was appointed to the board of directors of Bahrain Chamber of Commerce and Industry and BMMI where he served until November 21, 2022 when he was appointed Minister of Industry and Commerce.

Fakhro is a member of the board of Mumtalakat, the sovereign wealth fund of Bahrain.
