= United Tower =

Skyscraper in Bahrain

- برج المتحدة

General information
- Status: Completed
- Type: Office, Hotel
- Architectural style: Modernism
- Location: Plot D.02-II, Bahrain Bay, Manama, Bahrain
- Coordinates: 26.2467°N 50.5771°E
- Construction started: 2011
- Completed: 2016

Height
- Roof: 189.2 m (621 ft)

Technical details
- Floor count: 48
- Lifts/elevators: 16 (ThyssenKrupp)

Design and construction
- Architect: Aref Sadeq Design Consultants
- Developer: Cooperation Investment House BSC
- Main contractor: Ahmed AlQaed Group

The United Tower (Arabic: برج المتحدة) is a mixed-use skyscraper in the Bahrain Bay district of Manama, Bahrain. Built between 2011 and 2016, the tower stands at 189.2 m (621 ft) tall with 48 floors and is the current 9th tallest building in Bahrain.

== History ==
Located in the Bahrain Bay, the mixed-use skyscraper houses both corporate office spaces and short-term rental residential suites. The entire project was developed by the Bahrain Cooperation Investment House (BSC) and was initially scheduled to be completed in the first quarter of 2015, but was pushed for mid-2016 which was the final term. The volumetry of the construction rises from an octogonal floor base twisted counter clockwise, rendering it as a twisted (helical) octagonal prism.

The project was built on artificial reclaimed land from within the Diplomatic Area of Manama, with total costs rising up to $2.5 Billion. Global real estate consultancy CBRE Bahrain has signed a master lease agreement with the Bahrain Institute of Public Administration (BIPA) to occupy 2,000 m^{2} (21,500 sq ft) of space for the construction site in the Bahrain Bay district. Fourteen of the building's floors house the Wyndham Grand Manama Hotel which was officially opened in December 2017.

The building is equipped with a total of 16 elevators reaching speeds of up to 3.5 m/s provided by the German company ThyssenKrupp, and features a total office area of 26,000 m^{2} (280,000 sq ft). It was part of the Bahrain Bay's development program initiated in the early 2010s.

== See also ==
- List of tallest hotels
- List of tallest structures in Bahrain
- List of tallest structures in the Middle East
