= Seef =

Coordinates: 26.240°N 50.537°E

Seef السيف
- District
- Seef at night

- Location in Bahrain
- Country: Bahrain
- Governorate: Capital Governorate

Seef (Arabic: السيف) is a commercial district in Manama, the capital city of Bahrain.

== Etymology ==
The word 'seef' means coast or shore in the Gulf Arabic lexicon, similar to 'sahel'.

== History ==
Seef is a result of active land reclamation work starting in the 1980s, which has dramatically changed the Bahrain coastline. Surrounded on three sides by the sea, Seef is a district dominated by office blocks, luxury apartments, hotels and multiple shopping malls.

Rents in Seef (alongside Amwaj Islands) are reportedly the highest in the entire country. Seef is fast developing into a business centre with many local and multinational companies building their offices in the area. Seef is the location of the 172 metres (564 ft) high Almoayyed Tower, which was the tallest building in the country (now replaced by the Bahrain Financial Harbour).

== See also ==
- Seef Mall
- Bahrain City Centre
- List of tallest buildings and structures in Bahrain
- Land reclamation in Bahrain
