= Four Seasons Hotel Manama =

Skyscraper in Bahrain

- فور سيزونز بحرين باي الذي
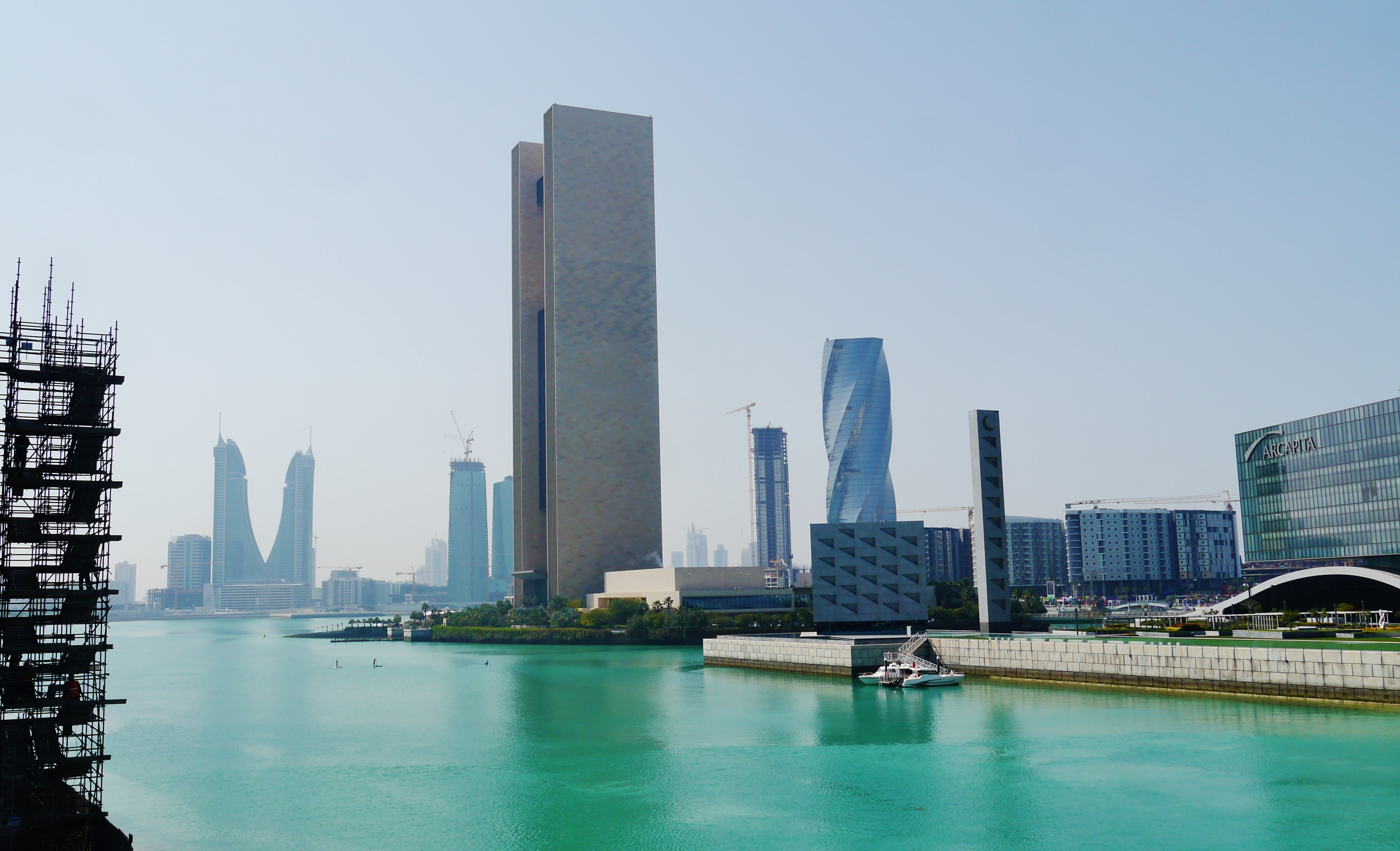

General information
- Status: Completed
- Type: Hotel
- Architectural style: Modernism
- Location: Bahrain Bay, Manama, Bahrain
- Coordinates: 26.24715°N 50.58189°E
- Construction started: 2010
- Completed: 2015
- Owner: Four Seasons Hotels and Resorts

Height
- Roof: 269.7 m (885 ft)

Technical details
- Floor count: 50

Design and construction
- Architect: Skidmore, Owings & Merrill
- Structural engineer: Werner Sobek; Dunbar & Boardman Partnership

The Four Seasons Hotel Manama (Arabic: فور سيزونز بحرين باي الذي) is a skyscraper hotel in the Bahrain Bay district of Manama, Bahrain. Built between 2010 and 2015, the tower stands at 269.7 m (885 ft) with 50 floors and is the current tallest building in Bahrain. It is the property of Four Seasons Hotels and Resorts.

== History ==
The hotel features an H-shaped silhouette, a reference to the initial of Four Seasons Hotels, and is located on a 12-acre private artificial island. The building was designed by the American architectural firm Skidmore, Owings and Merrill and the German firm Werner Sobek Group GmbH. The concept of the building was lightwork. The façades are uplighted with a wash of light, enhancing the presence of the two monoliths. The internal façade reveals the inner voids, creating a sense of depth and openness. A simple, warm white lighting palette was chosen to enrich the natural colour and texture of the stone cladding panels.

The facade of the Four Seasons Hotel Bahrain Bay features almost 20,000 m^{2} (215,000 sq ft) of marble that were imported from Italy, Germany, and Greece in just six months.

The building is mainly composed of two monolithic structures supporting the inner floors, shelling them with a system of glass walls. The hotel operates through the first floors from above the ground. A spa is located at the levels close to the top.

An initial design for the building envisioned a 60-story, 300-meter tower.

The hotel has a total of 273 rooms and 30 suites spread over 50 floors, all of which offer 360-degree panoramic views of the Bahrain Bay District and Manama. In addition, the hotel features a spa, several swimming pools, and a Michelin-starred floating restaurant known as the "Skypod".

The hotel also features a high-tech business and facilities with the functionality of hosting events and meetings, a ballroom, and a multifunctional banquet hall.

== See also ==
- List of tallest hotels
- List of tallest structures in Bahrain
- List of tallest structures in the Middle East

Records
Preceded by Bahrain Financial Harbour	Tallest building in Bahrain; 2015–present 269.7 metres (885 ft)	Incumbent
