= Bahrain World Trade Center =

Twin skyscraper complex in Manama, Bahrain

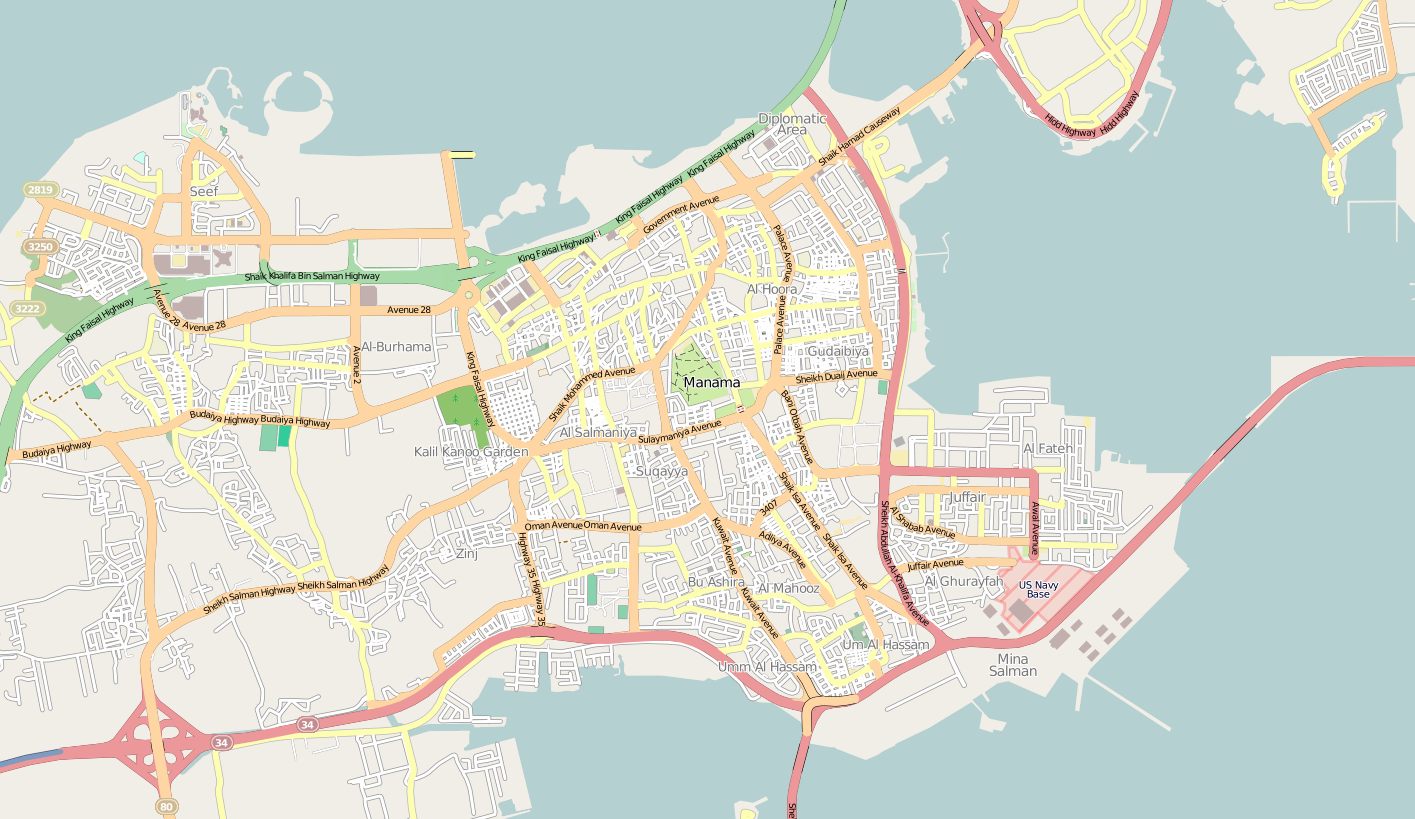
- Location within Manama Location within Bahrain

General information
- Status: Completed
- Type: Commercial
- Location: Manama, Bahrain
- Coordinates: 26°14′21″N 50°34′53″E
- Construction started: 2004
- Opening: 2008
- Cost: US$150 million
- Operator: Atkins

Height
- Antenna spire: 240 m (787 ft)

Technical details
- Floor count: 50
- Lifts/elevators: 4

Design and construction
- Architect: Atkins
- Main contractor: Murray & Roberts,(renamed Concor) / Ramboll, Norwin A/S, Elsam Engineering

The Bahrain World Trade Center is a 240-metre-high (787 ft), 50-floor, twin tower complex located in Manama, Bahrain. Designed by the multi-national architectural firm Atkins, construction on the towers was completed in 2008. It is the first skyscraper in the world to integrate wind turbines into its design. The wind turbines were developed, built and installed by the Danish company Norwin A/S. The structure is constructed close to the King Faisal Highway, near popular landmarks such as the towers of Bahrain Financial Harbour (BFH), NBB and Abraj Al Lulu. It currently ranks as the second-tallest building in Bahrain, after the twin towers of the Bahrain Financial Harbour. The project has received several awards for sustainability, including the 2006 LEAF Award for Best Use of Technology within a Large Scheme and the Arab Construction World for Sustainable Design Award.

== Structural details ==
The two towers are linked via three skybridges, each holding a 225 kW wind turbine, totalling to 675 kW of wind power capacity. Each of these turbines measure 29 m (95 ft) in diameter, and is aligned north, which is the direction from which air from the Persian Gulf blows in. The sail-shaped buildings on either side are designed to funnel wind through the gap to provide accelerated wind passing through the turbines. This was confirmed by wind tunnel tests, which showed that the buildings create an S-shaped flow, ensuring that any wind coming within a 45° angle to either side of the central axis will create a wind stream that remains perpendicular to the turbines. This significantly increases their potential to generate electricity.

The wind turbines are expected to provide 11% to 15% of the towers' total power consumption, or approximately 1.1 to 1.3 GWh a year. This is equivalent to providing the lighting for about 300 homes, 258 hospitals, 17 industrial plants, and 33 car engines. The three turbines were turned on for the first time on 8 April 2008. They are expected to operate 50% of the time on an average day.

== In fiction ==
The Bahrain WTC was featured prominently in the 2009 science fiction SyFy channel made-for-television movie Annihilation Earth. In the movie, an incident involving a subatomic collider in the year 2020 creates cataclysmic effects on planet Earth. CGI is used in the movie to show the WTC collapsing as a result of an earthquake, though the reason for the earthquake is not fully explained in the movie.

== Gallery ==
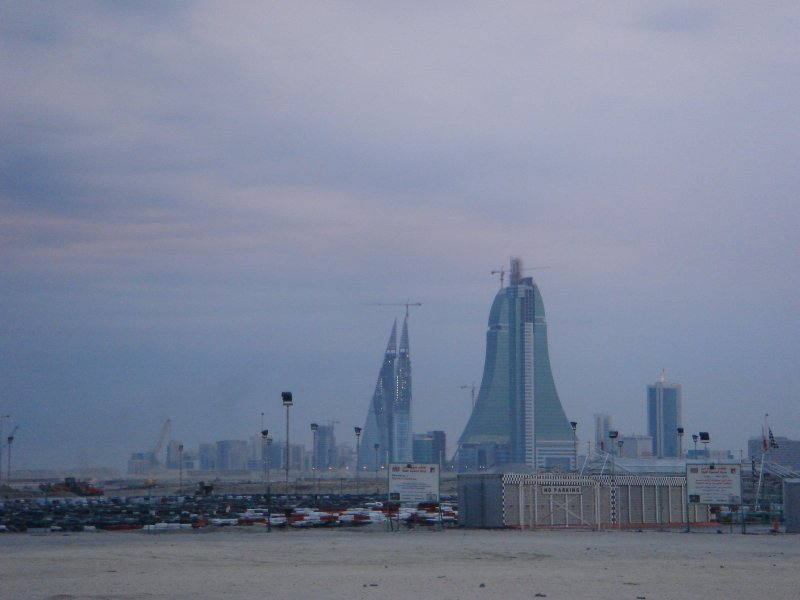
Bahrain World Trade Center and Bahrain Financial Harbour under construction in 2006

The three wind turbines are at the centre of the two skyscrapers

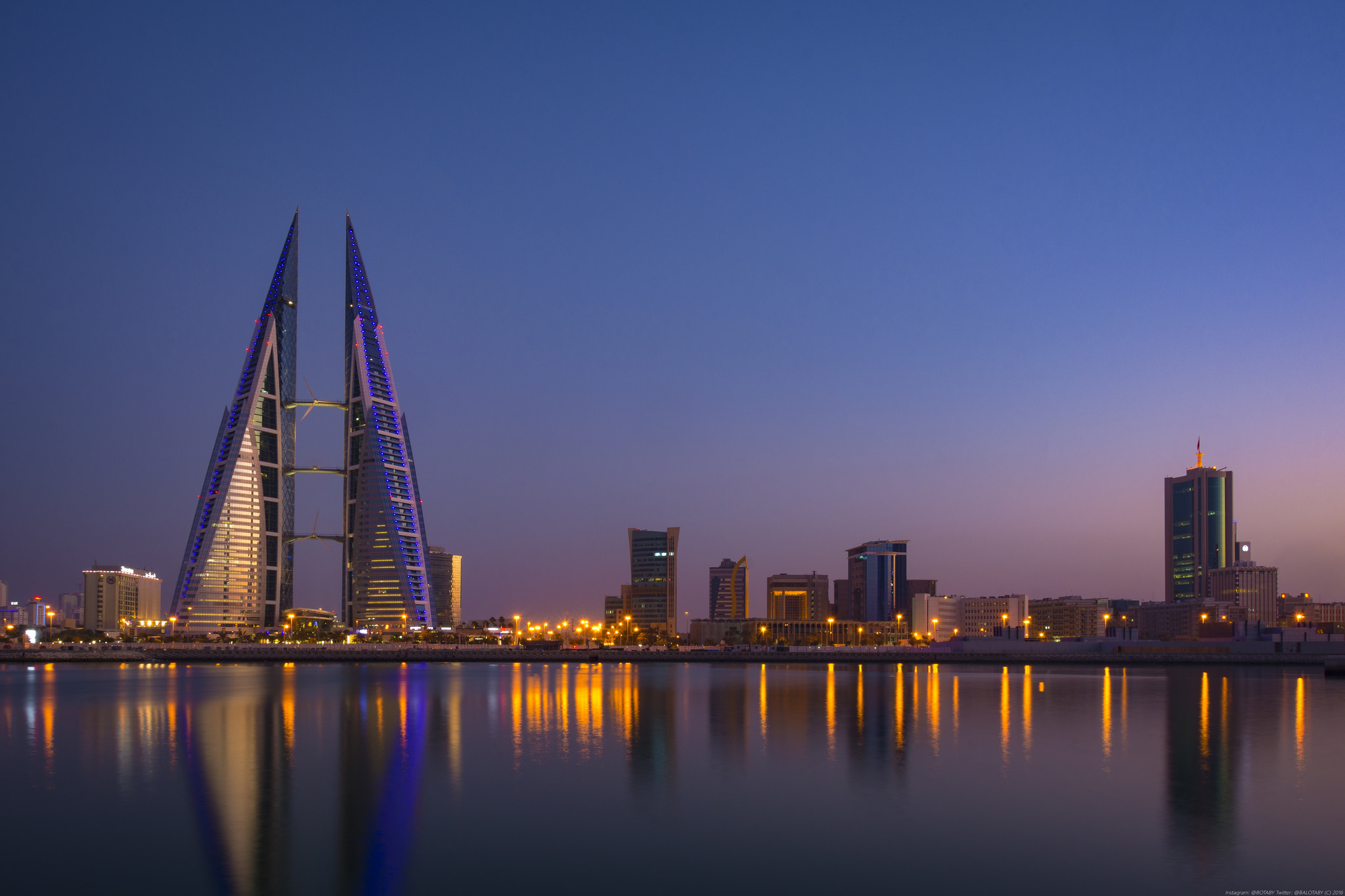
Bahrain World Trade Center during the blue hour

== See also ==
- List of tallest structures in Bahrain
- List of twin buildings and structures
- List of world trade centers
- Unconventional wind turbines

Records
Preceded by Almoayyed Tower	Tallest building in Bahrain; 2008–2009; 240 metres (790 ft)	Succeeded by Bahrain Financial Harbour
