= 25-27 Mercer Street =

Residential buildings in Manhattan, New York

25 Mercer Street
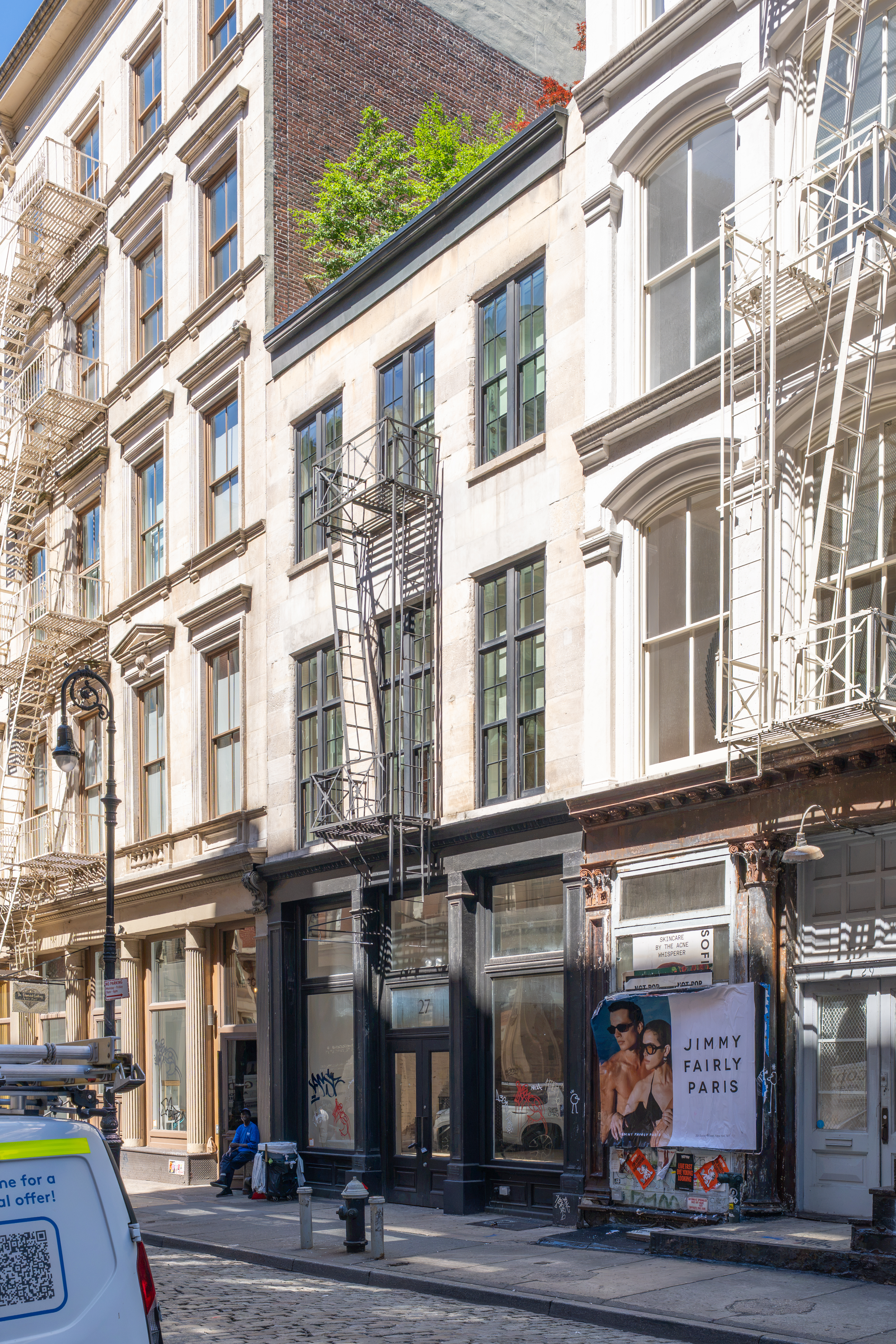
- Interactive map of the 25 Mercer Street area
- Former names: 25 Mercer Street, 27 Mercer Street

General information
- Type: Residential
- Location: Manhattan, New York City, United States
- Coordinates: 40°43′15″N 74°00′07″W
- Construction started: 1861
- Completed: 1867; 159 years ago
- Renovated: 2016; 10 years ago

Technical details
- Floor count: 5

Design and construction
- Architects: Ritch & Griffith, Fogarty Finger
- Developer: Amos Eno, Michael David Kirchmann

25-27 Mercer Street are two historic five-story cast-iron structures located in the SoHo neighborhood of Manhattan in New York City. Originally built in 1861, 25 Mercer Street was owned by American real estate investor Amos Eno. 27 Mercer Street was designed by architecture firm Ritch & Griffith, with construction starting in 1867. The buildings were renovated in 2016 and developed into residential condominiums with commercial spaces on the ground floor by Michael Kirchmann of GDSNY. The development was featured in an episode of the Bravo television show Million Dollar Listing New York.

== See also ==
- New York City Landmarks Preservation Commission
