= 500 West 25th Street =

Residential buildings in Manhattan, New York

500 West 25th Street, The Emerson
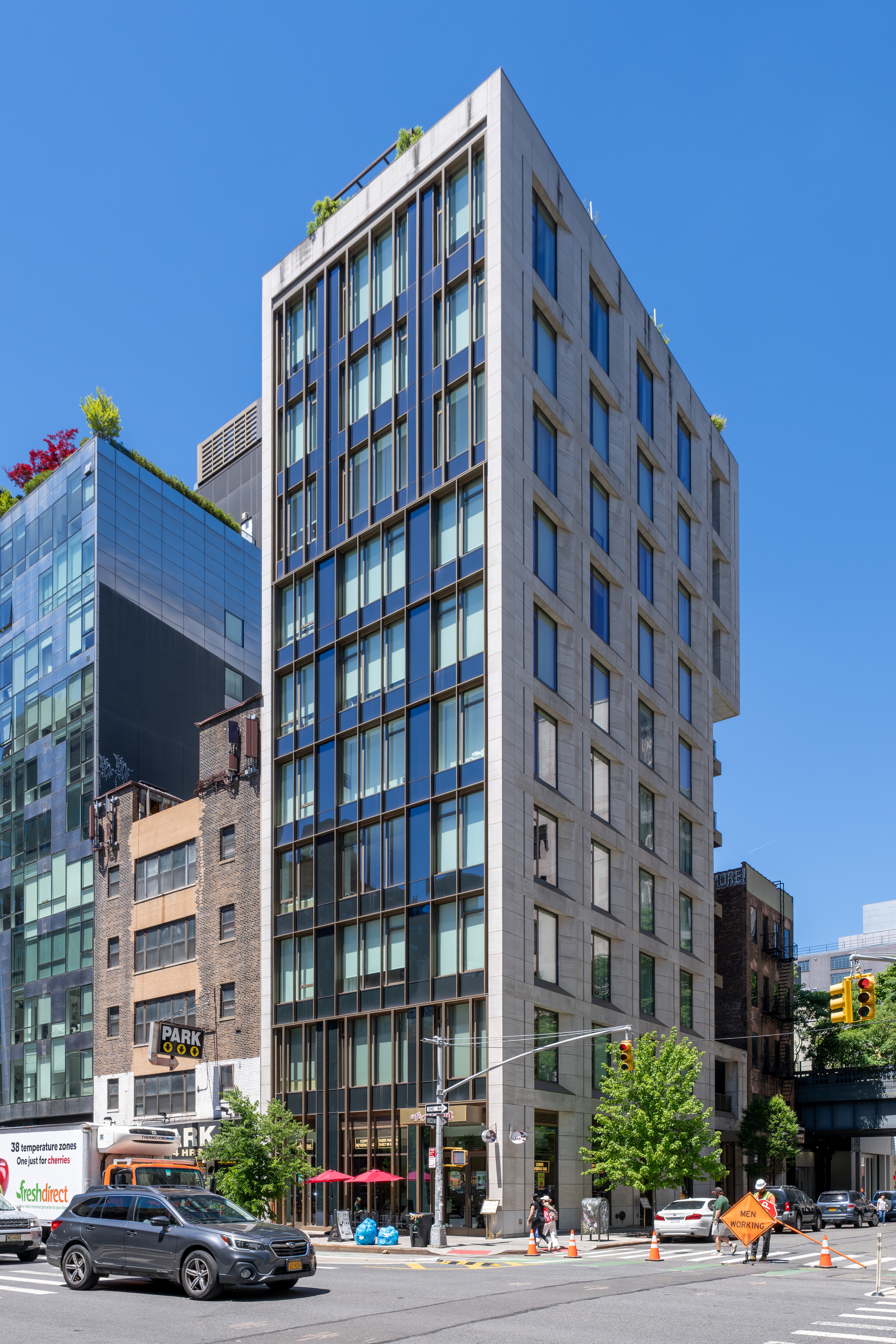
- Interactive map of the 500 West 25th Street, The Emerson area

General information
- Type: Mixed-Use
- Location: Manhattan, New York City, United States
- Coordinates: 40°44′56.22″N 74°00′11.808″W
- Construction started: 2016
- Completed: 2020; 6 years ago

Technical details
- Floor count: 10

Design and construction
- Architects: GDSNY, GF55 Partners
- Developer: GDSNY

500 West 25th Street, also known as The Emerson, is a mixed-use development consisting of a ten-story building located in the Chelsea neighborhood of Manhattan, at the corner of 25th Street and Tenth Avenue. The ground floor contains retail spaces, while residential units occupy the remaining floors. It is adjacent to the High Line elevated park and provides a view of the park and the Hudson River from each residence.

The building was named after American poet and philosopher Ralph Waldo Emerson. It was designed and developed by Michael David Kirchmann of GDSNY with GF55 Partners as the architect of record; construction started in 2016 and was completed in 2020. The building is situated on two lots that were formerly occupied by a single story car stereo store and a four-story apartment building, both of which were demolished to make way for the new development. The design of the building uses a grid of windows, columns, and beams and is clad in Alabama limestone. A distinctive feature of the structure is a cantilever on the upper three levels, which makes it one of only two structures with a cantilever along the High Line. The building is also one of only 24 properties in Manhattan to receive the New York City Green Property Certification (as 239 Tenth Avenue), which recognizes properties listed as among the safest in the city to live and work.
