= Fakhro Tower =

Office building in Manama, Bahrain

General information
- Location: Manama, Bahrain
- Coordinates: 26°13′52″N 50°32′59″E
- Construction started: 2010
- Completed: 2013
- Owner: Abdulla Yousif Fakhro & Sons BSC(c)
- Operator: CBRE

Technical details
- Floor count: 30
- Lifts/elevators: 6

Design and construction
- Architect: The Modern Architect
- Quantity surveyor: Baker Wilkins Smith
- Main contractor: Kooheji Contractors

Other information
- Parking: 415 bays

Fakhro Tower is a commercial office complex in Manama, Bahrain, located across the street from the Bahrain City Centre mall. The building has 30 floors, consisting of a double-height lobby with showroom space, five floors of podium parking, and 24 floors of office space. The tower was designed by The Modern Architect and constructed by Kooheji Contractors.

Abdulla Yousif Fakhro & Sons BSC(c), one of the oldest family businesses in Bahrain is an anchor tenant in the tower and currently occupies the topmost floor. Other Fakhro-affiliated businesses also occupy four of the lower office floors as of January 2013.

== Background ==
Abdulla Yousif Fakhro & Sons BSC(c) is the owner, property developer and anchor tenant of the building. The occupancy rate of the tower approached 30% at launch in large part due to the relocation of the Fakhro Group of companies into the building. As of January 2013, the Fakhro Tower served as the corporate headquarters of Abdulla Yousif Fakhro & Sons, Fakhro Restaurants (McDonald's Bahrain), Fakhro Transport (Budget Rent A Car Bahrain), Fakhro Electronics, MBA Fakhro, Dukakeen e-commerce, Artify 360, SunCity Ventures WLL, and Fakhro Commercial Services.

On March 3, 2013, the landlord announced the signing of a lease agreement with KPMG Fakhro. KPMG had committed to over two floors in the building and began fit-out works with the intention to occupy their premises in the second quarter of 2013. KPMG represents the first major third-party tenant in the tower.

== Location and features ==
The building is located on a service road that runs parallel to the Sheikh Khalifa Bin Salman Al Khalifa Highway in the heart of Manama, Bahrain. This service road also connects to the Labour Market Regulatory Authority (Bahrain), Bahrain Chamber of Commerce and Industry, Bahrain International Exhibition & Convention Centre, and The Bahrain Mall.

As of the completion date, the landlord has been offering the office floors in shell and core presentation. The typical floor plate measures approximately 825 m^{2} (8,880 sq ft) in total and can be subdivided into up to four office units starting at 130 m^{2} (1,400 sq ft). Common toilets and corridors are integrated into the building core and are available on all floors. Notable interior finishes in all common areas include black granite flooring from India and moca creme limestone wall cladding from Portugal in the bathrooms.

Some of the common area amenities offered in the tower include multipurpose function rooms, a fully equipped gym, catered cafeteria, landscaped terrace, and men's and women's prayer rooms. The amenities are provided by the landlord as a general service to all building tenants.

== Management ==
In April 2012, the building owner appointed CBRE Group to lease and manage the Fakhro Tower. CBRE was appointed prior to practical completion and was involved in testing and commissioning plant and equipment, setting operational procedures, managing maintenance contractors, and drafting tenancy manuals.

In November 2018, Cluttons Middle East, a part of Savills Group, has been appointed the sole property manager and exclusive leasing agent for Fakhro Tower.

== Gallery ==
View of Fakhro Tower elevation from the 6th floor landscaped terrace

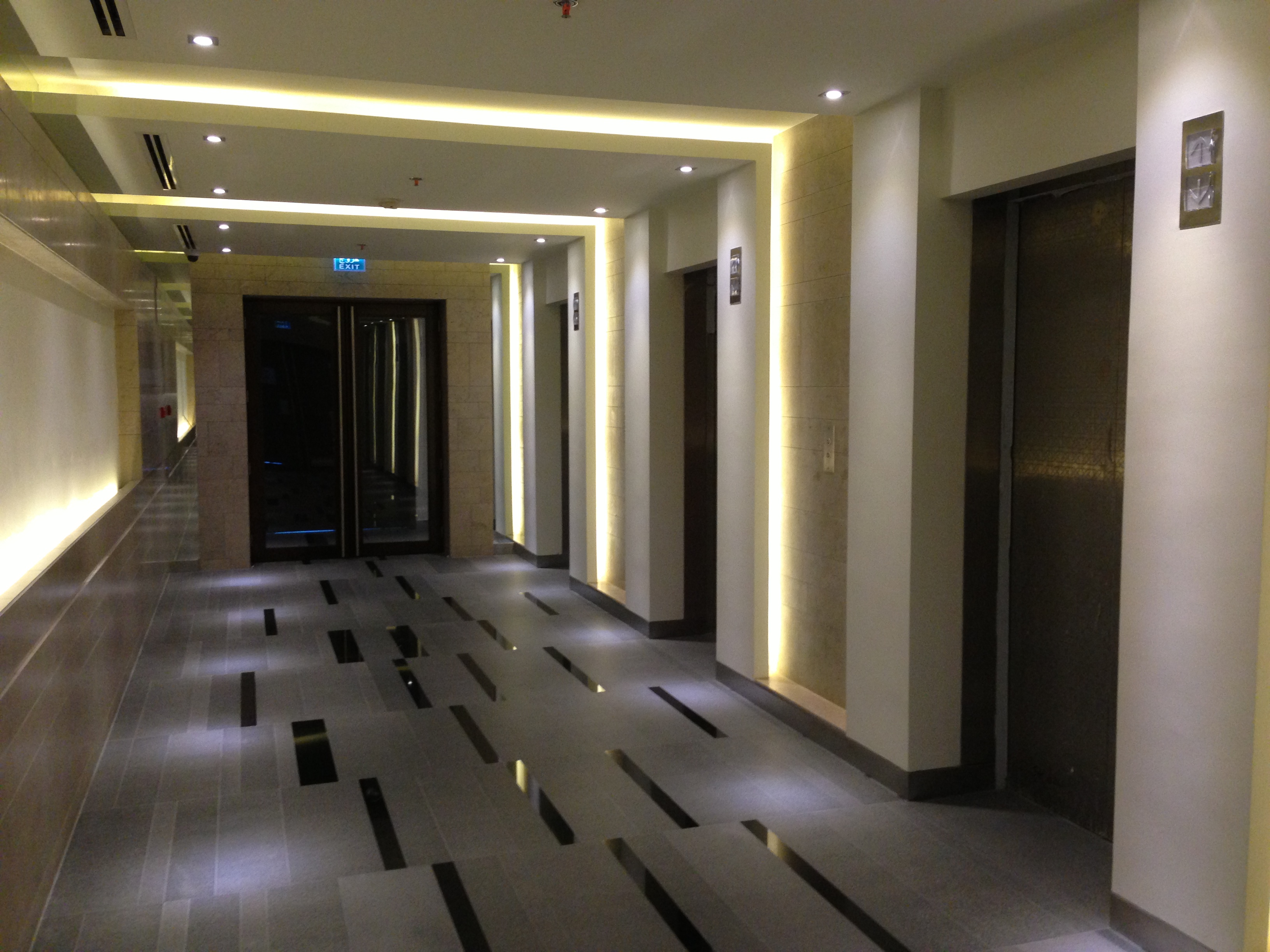
Typical lift lobby on all levels at the Fakhro Tower

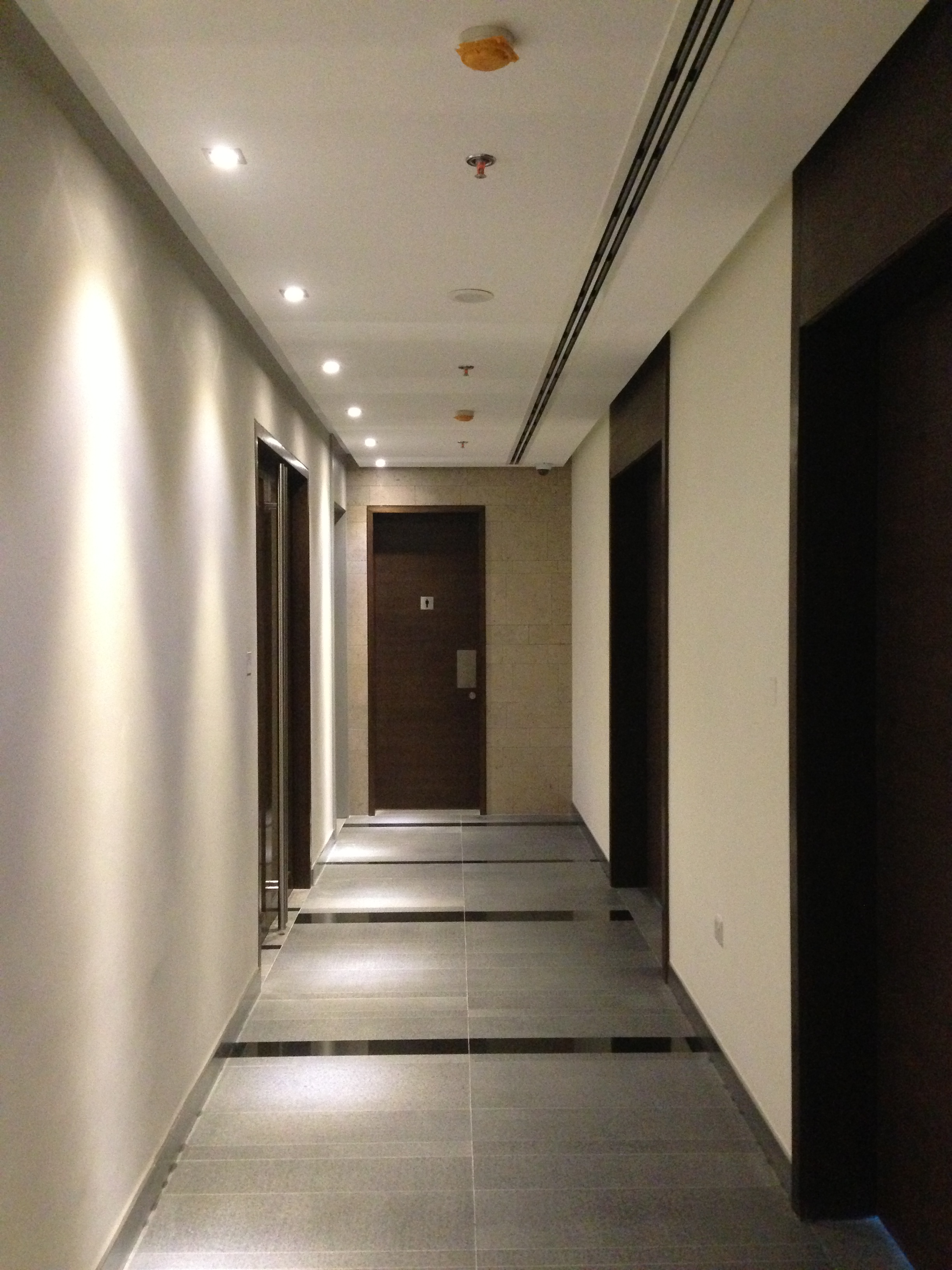
Typical common corridor on all levels at the Fakhro Tower

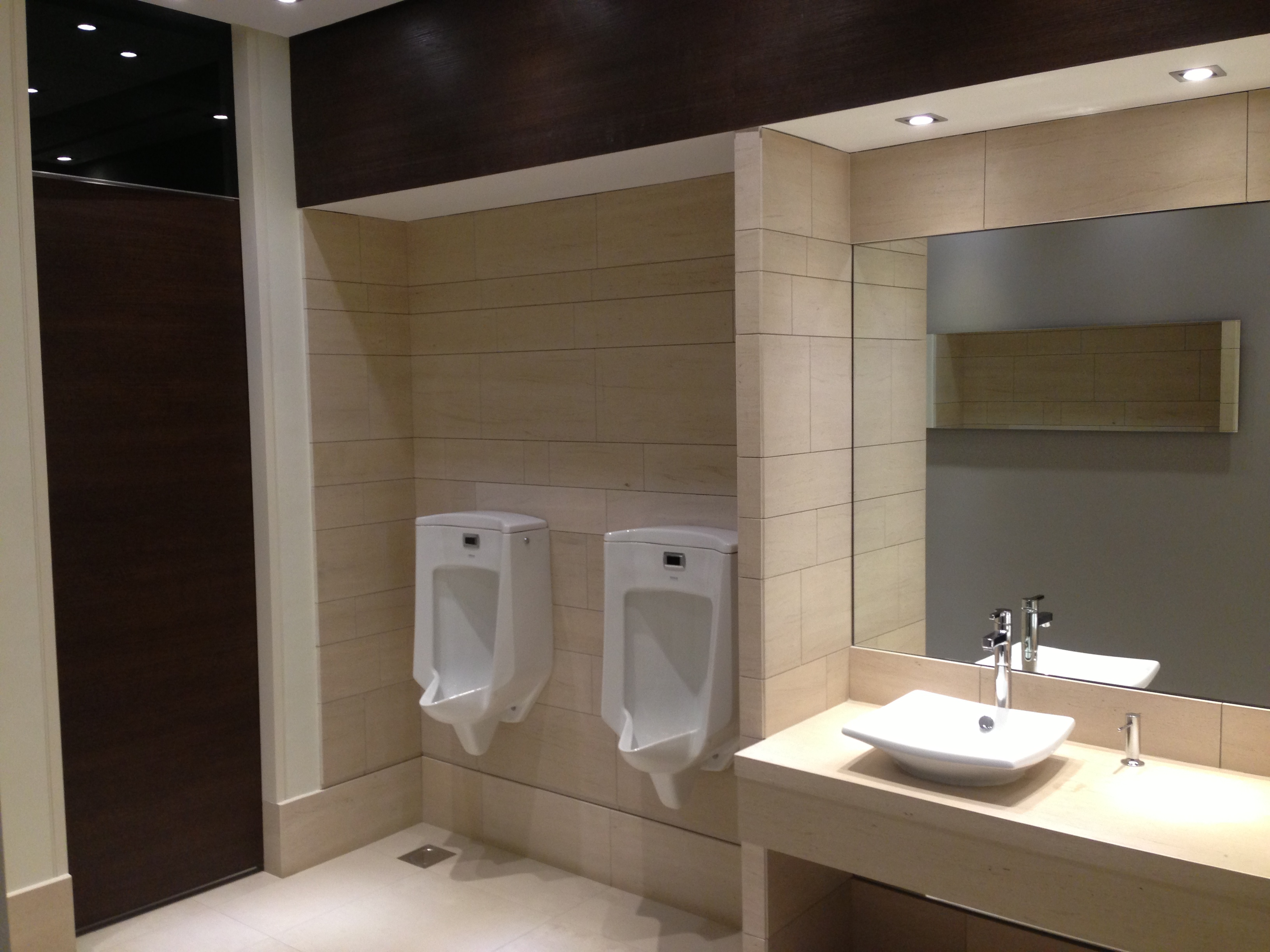
Typical common men's bathroom on all levels at the Fakhro Tower
