= Kirk Myers =

American physical training instructor

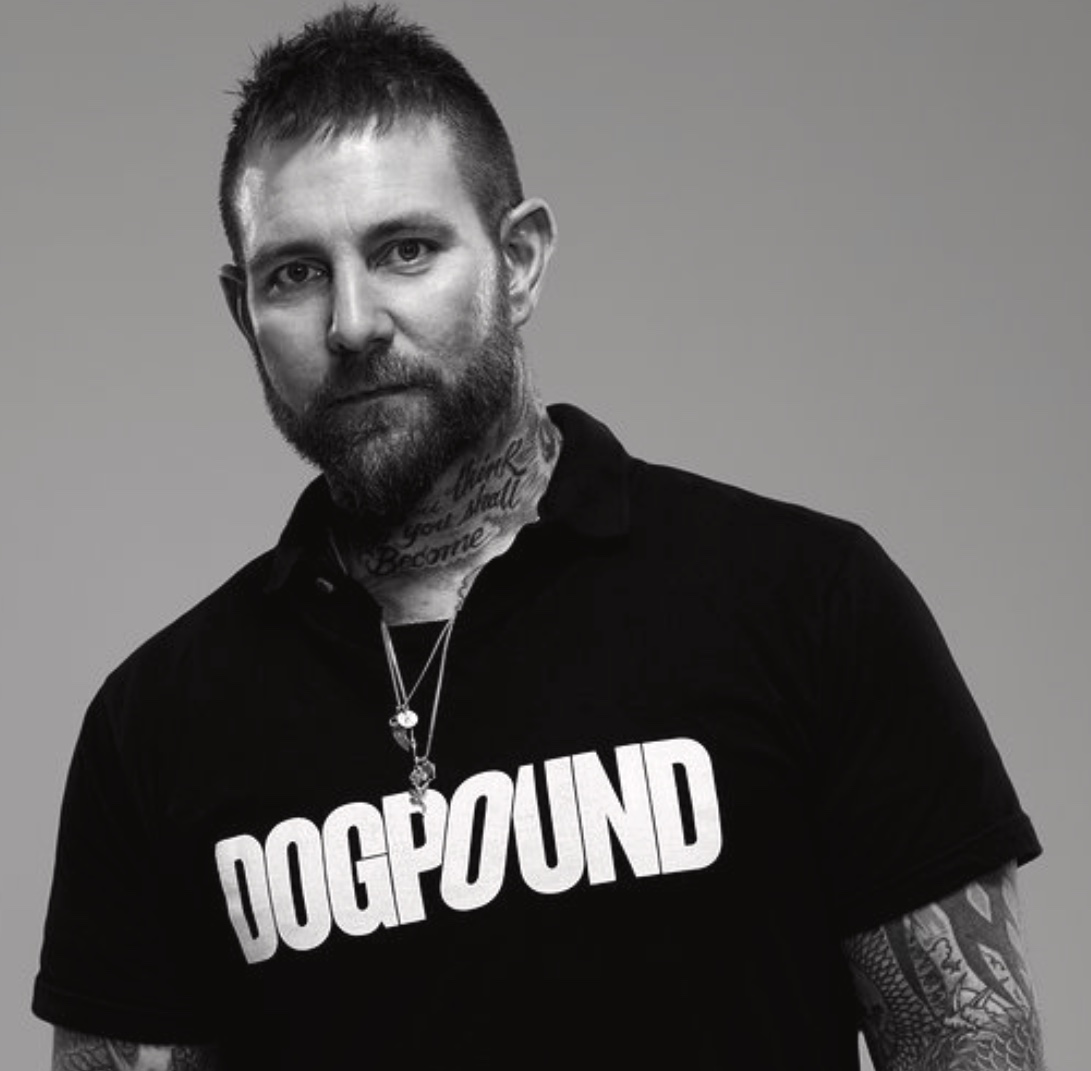
- Born: Kirk Thomas Myers; March 3, 1979 (age 46); Kansas City, Missouri, U.S.
- Occupations: Personal trainer; physical fitness instructor; CEO of DOGPOUND
- Years active: 2002–present

Kirk Thomas Myers (born March 3, 1979) is an American physical training instructor known for coaching celebrities in through his business, Dogpound Gyms.

== Early life ==
Myers was born in Kansas City, Missouri, to Rosemary Gibbons and Roger Myers. Myers was overweight throughout his childhood and teen years. Being fed mostly junk food and chocolate milk, at his heaviest he weighed more than 300 lbs.

At age 21, an emergency medical exam revealed that he had congestive heart failure. He was hospitalized and remained in intensive care for 11 days. Afterwards, he became very interested in sports and nutrition, managing to lose almost 130 pounds (59 kg) in two years.

== Career ==
After starting his career as a coach in Kansas, Myers abused alcohol and drugs, eventually requiring him to seek intensive care. Through self help and help from his family, he regained control of his life. He moved to New York, where he established a client base of celebrities, eventually resulting to him becoming one of the most sought after personal trainers in the city.

He has worked as a personal trainer for celebrity clients, including Taylor Swift, Justin Bieber, Adam Levine, Hugh Jackman, Gerard Butler, and many Victoria's Secret models.

Myers has been featured in numerous magazines, publications and TV segments.

=== Dogpound ===
In the fall of 2013, Myers met Hugh Jackman. Soon he was joined by Tom Farley, who was then the president of the New York Stock Exchange and several other new "members". The group started training together and started a weekly group. Jackman would bring his dog to the sessions, so they took the name Dogpound.

During the first month of the opening of Dogpound, Myers was introduced to his first Victoria's Secret Angel Jasmine Tookes; word of mouth lead to more celebrities signing up. The gym is currently closed to new clients and the New York location has more than a 100-person waiting list.
