= Bahrain Bay =

District in Bahrain

Native name: خليج البحرين
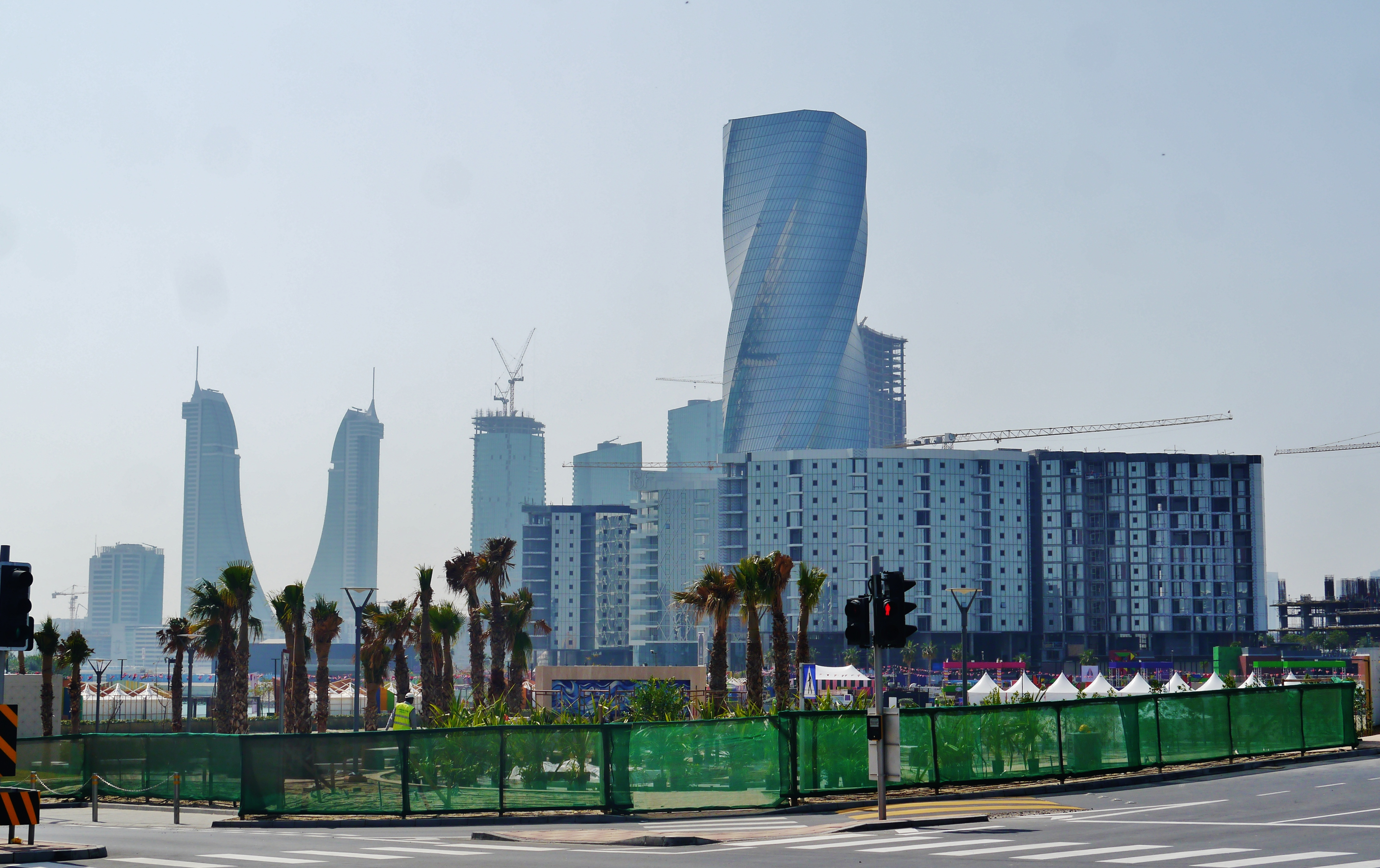
- Bahrain Bay skyline

- Location within Bahrain

Geography
- Location: Persian Gulf
- Coordinates: 26°15′00″N 50°34′45″E
- Archipelago: Bahrain
- Adjacent to: Persian Gulf
- Total islands: 7
- Major islands: zone 1; zone 2; Arcapita Island; Four Seasons Island
- Area: 1.35 km^{2} (0.52 sq mi)
- Coastline: 8 km (5 mi)
- Highest elevation: 0 m (0 ft)

Administration
- Bahrain
- Governorate: Capital Governorate
- Largest settlement: zone 1 (pop. 100)

Demographics
- Demonym: Bahraini
- Population: 100 (2010)
- Pop. density: 74/km^{2} (192/sq mi)
- Ethnic groups: Bahraini, non-Bahraini

Additional information
- Time zone: AST (UTC+3)
- ISO code: BH-13
- Official website: www.bahrainbay.com

Bahrain Bay is a residential and commercial district located on the main island of Bahrain (26°15'01.1"N 50°34'45.8"E), 6.8 kilometres (4.2 miles) (15 minutes) from Bahrain International Airport.

== Description ==
Bahrain Bay is situated on coastal land adjacent to the original political and business area in the heart of Bahrain's capital city Manama. (Geographically, Bahrain as an island, sits in the center of the Persian Gulf and is connected by a bridged causeway to neighboring Saudi Arabia) across the shallow waters which form the bay.

The project was designed by American firm Skidmore, Owings & Merrill, who also designed the Burj Khalifa, the world's tallest tower. The master plan was designed by then-SOM architect Michael David Kirchmann, who explored the idea of concentric circles appearing as ripples from the central anchor structure.

Completed in 2012 and sporting several flyovers, Bahrain Bay is linked to the main multi-lane carriageways of the city by the purpose-built North Manama Causeway. This is a raised 6 lane highway some 4 kilometres (2.5 miles) in length which loops around the bay. This carriageway has wide exits and entrance ramps along its route which connect to the various areas of Bahrain Bay. The main road leads to the North and West highways at one end (Al Fateh Highway) and the nearby Bahrain Financial Harbor at the other. This junction also leads to the east and southbound routes (King Faisal Highway) and the old central Manama ‘souk’.

== Infrastructure ==
Reclamation was completed in 2011 with infrastructure foundation and 3.3 kilometres (2.1 miles) of key walls in place. A district cooling facility with chilled water connects to all land parcels.

A 66 kV primary substation with five small 11 kV substations have been designed and constructed to power the entire project with redundancy built in. This and two sewerage pumping stations complete the utilities infrastructure.

Created by the reclamation of three islands – the north island, south island, and the Four Seasons central island – the development creates an inner harbor adjacent to the northern corniche of Manama. It is connected to the mainland by two multi-lane causeways, and encircled by a new ring road called the North Manama Causeway. The project has a total reclaimed area of 1.35 square kilometres (0.52 square miles). The project uses 3.3 kilometres (2.1 miles) of quay wall, and 4 kilometres (2.5 miles) of vehicular roads. As part of the infrastructure, the project has built four 66 kV primary substations, five 11 kV substations, two potable water reservoirs, and two sewerage pumping stations.

== Anchor Developments ==
There are two Anchor Developments to Bahrain Bay which form the cornerstones of the project:

=== Arcapita Group ===
Arcapita, an international investment manager and the majority shareholder of the project, has located their global corporate headquarters at Bahrain Bay.

=== Four Season Hotel ===
The Four Seasons hotel.

== International Investors ==
Third-party developers who have purchased land in the project include:

- Al Baraka Banking Group, a global Islamic banking institution. Having decided to relocate its headquarters in 2016, the Al Baraka Banking Group purpose-built offices were completed. The building consists of two towers linked by a bridge, each 9 floors above ground, plus a mezzanine level. It has 4 levels of basement parking and ground level spaces.
- Waterbay Residences. The first construction of residential sections of Bahrain Bay also began in 2017, with the ‘Waterbay’ project. The project consists of three buildings, each of ten stories.
- Golden Gate by Grnata Real Estate is a residential development with two towers containing 746 apartments. The towers rise to 44 and 53 stories, making them some of the tallest residential buildings in the Kingdom of Bahrain. The development spans over 140,000 square meters.
- The Onyx is a residential building that has 42 floors and includes 400 freehold residential apartments.
- Onyx Skyview is a mixed-use development that is a combination of residential, commercial, and retail spaces. The residential tower is 200-meter high.

== History ==
Soon after reclamation, the international investment bank firm Arcapita was the first developer to start construction. Also designed by Skidmore, Owings & Merrill, the predominantly glass Arcapita Headquarters is a rectangular structure on two low concrete arches. As well as being the Arcapita Headquarters, the total office space of 18,500 sqm houses several semi-governmental institutions which includes Bahrain Mumtalakat Holding Company, the Bahrain Tender Board, Osool, Amlak and the Economic Development Board of Bahrain.

In 2015 the Kingdom's first 68-floor Four Seasons Hotel was opened. It stands on its own island, is H-shaped and has 273 hotel rooms.

== Awards ==
Bahrain Bay has won several awards since its inception, including two Arabian Commercial Property Awards in association with Bloomberg Television for Best Mixed Use Development Arabia and Best Mixed Use Development Bahrain in 2010. That year the project went on to be nominated in the Best Mixed-Use development global category. It received the International Arch of Europe by Business Initiative Directions in 2007 (a vanity award), and was nominated in the Master Plan Award category of the 2011 Cityscape Global Awards.

== Administration ==
The island falls under the Capital Governorate.

== Transportation ==
There are two causeways connecting Bahrain Bay Islands with Manama on Bahrain Island.

== Image gallery ==
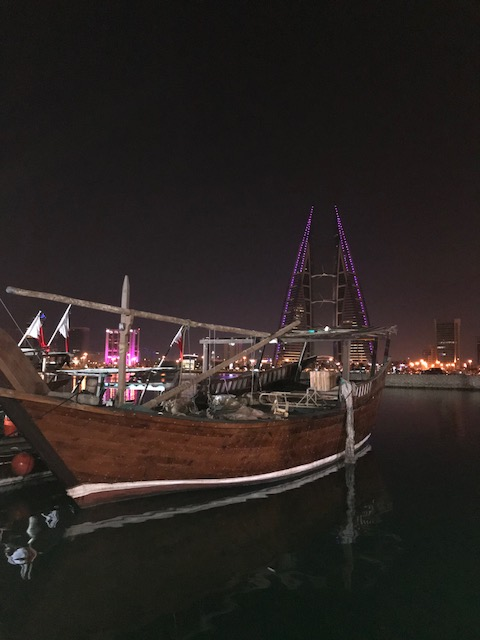
Bahrain Sea Festival - The Bahrain World Trade Centre in the background

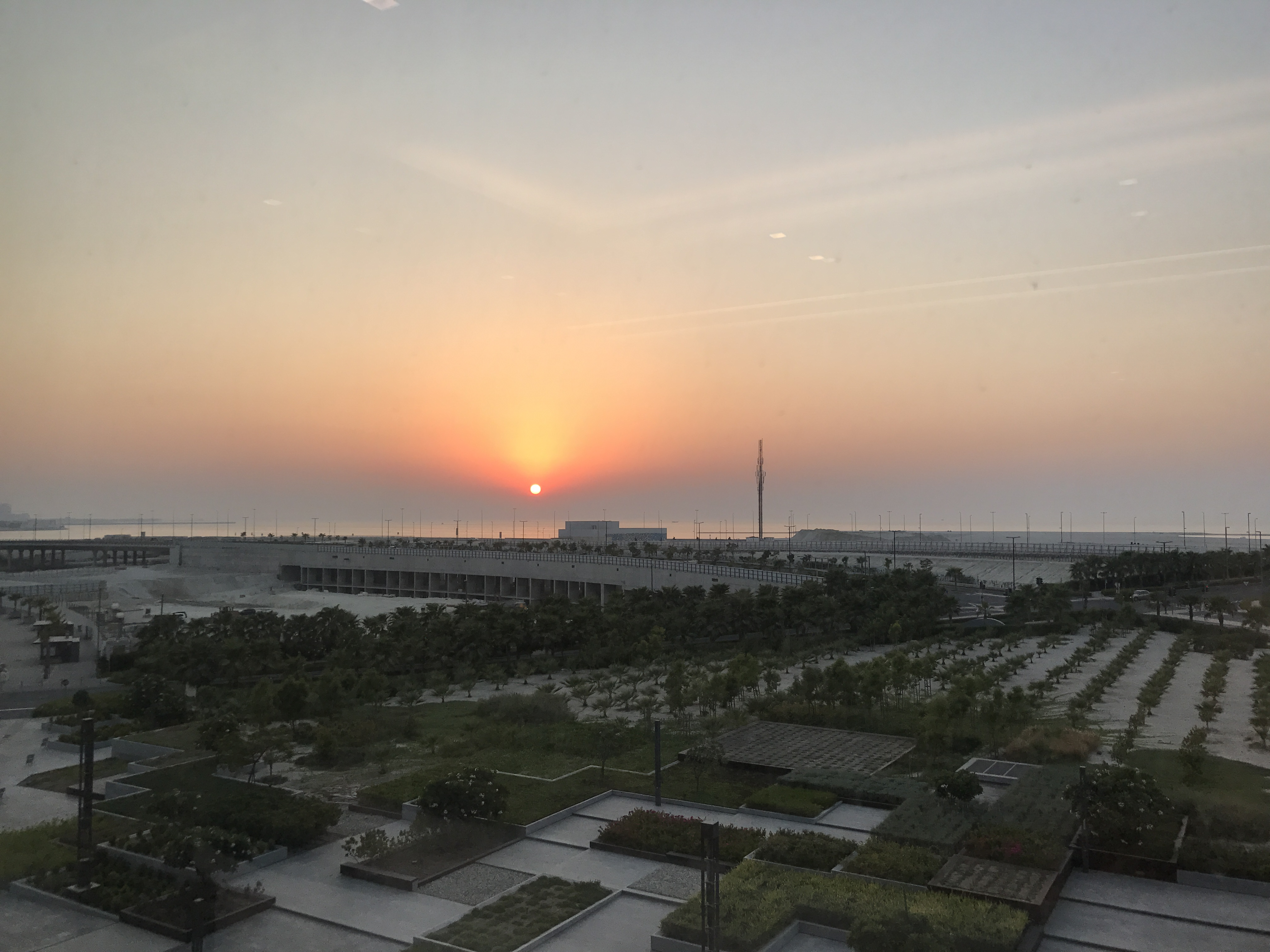
Landscape at Bahrain Bay

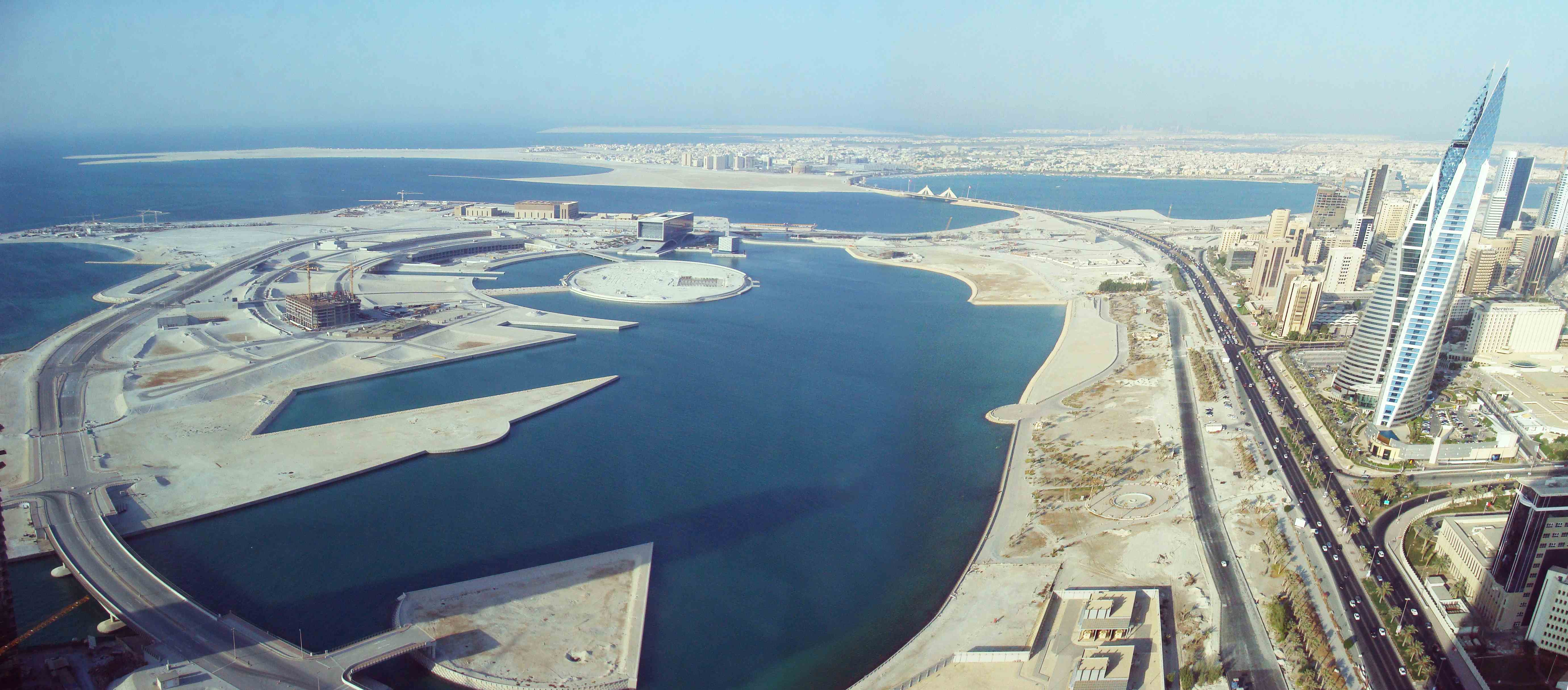
The state of progress of Bahrain Bay as of September 2011

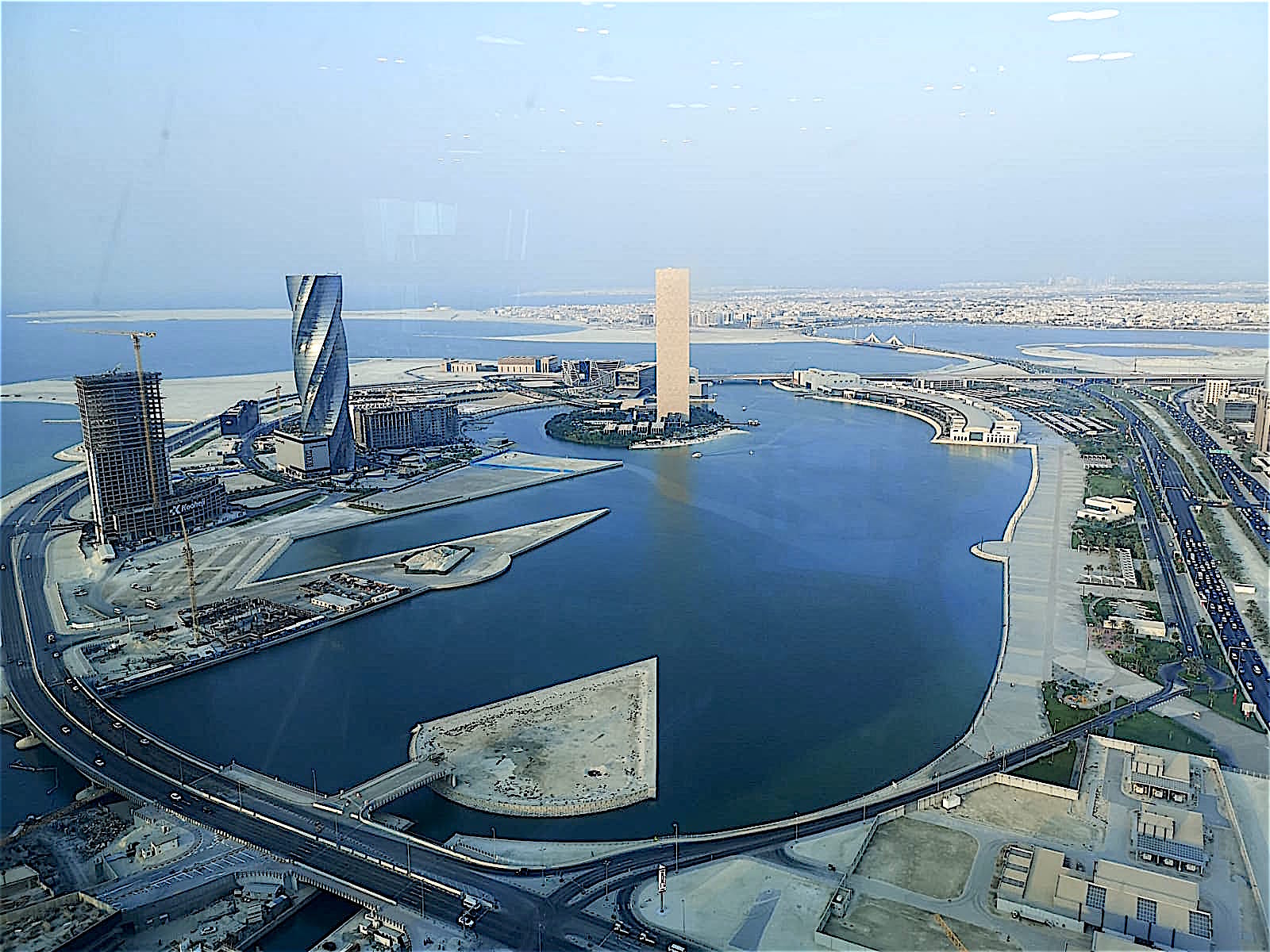
Bahrain Bay in October 2019 with the United Tower (center) and the Four Seasons Hotel Manama (right) in the background

Masjid Adnan Abdulmalik in Bahrain Bay
