= Fakhro Group =

The Fakhro Group
- Type: Private
- Industry: Conglomerate
- Founded: 1888; 138 years ago
- Founder: Abdulla bin Yousif Fakhro
- Headquarters: Manama, Bahrain,
- Area served: Manama, Dubai, Abu Dhabi, Sharjah, Doha
- Key people: Essam Abdulla Fakhro, (Chairman), Abdulla Adel Fakhro, (Managing Director), Yousif Abdulla Fakhro, (Managing Director)
- Products: automotive & industrial products, technology, restaurants, shipping, insurance, transport, agencies
- Website: fakhro.com

Fakhro Group, also known as the Abdulla Yousif Fakhro Group, is a Bahraini family-owned conglomerate with businesses in automotive distribution, information and communications technology, insurance, logistics, real estate, and food and beverage franchising. The group is headquartered in Manama, Bahrain.

== History ==
Fakhro Group traces its origins to 1888, when Haji Yousif bin Abdulrahman Fakhro began a trading business in Muharraq importing foodstuffs and building materials, mainly from India, for the local market. During the early 20th century, the business expanded into re-exporting across Gulf ports and later into agency agreements with international manufacturers of automobiles, engines, building products, and electrical appliances. According to the group, its relationship with Dunlop Tyres dates to 1934, while an agency for Nuffield automotive products was signed in 1932.

After the death of Haji Yousif in 1952, the family business passed to his five sons under the name Ahmad Fakhro & Bros. In 1958, the business was split into two companies, and Ahmad and Abdulla formed Ahmad & Abdulla Fakhro. In 1975, Ahmad sold his share to Abdulla, who then formed Abdulla Yousif Fakhro & Sons. The group later expanded into car rental and leasing, telecommunications, insurance, and food service; in 1994, it opened its first McDonald's restaurant in Bahrain.

In 2012, the group moved its headquarters to Fakhro Tower in Manama. In 2014, its restaurant business expanded to Saudi Arabia and Kuwait. The group cquired a majority shareholding in Gulf Agency Company (Bahrain) in 2007, and in 2018 moved that business to a logistics hub in Hidd. In 2024, Forbes Middle East included Fakhro Group in its list of the "Top 100 Arab Family Businesses".

== Agencies ==
- McDonald's
- Sony Ericsson
- Avaya
- Dunlop Tyres
- Mobil
- Budget Rent a Car
- AIG

== See also ==
- Fakhro Tower
