= Matthew Schreiber =

American artist (born 1967)

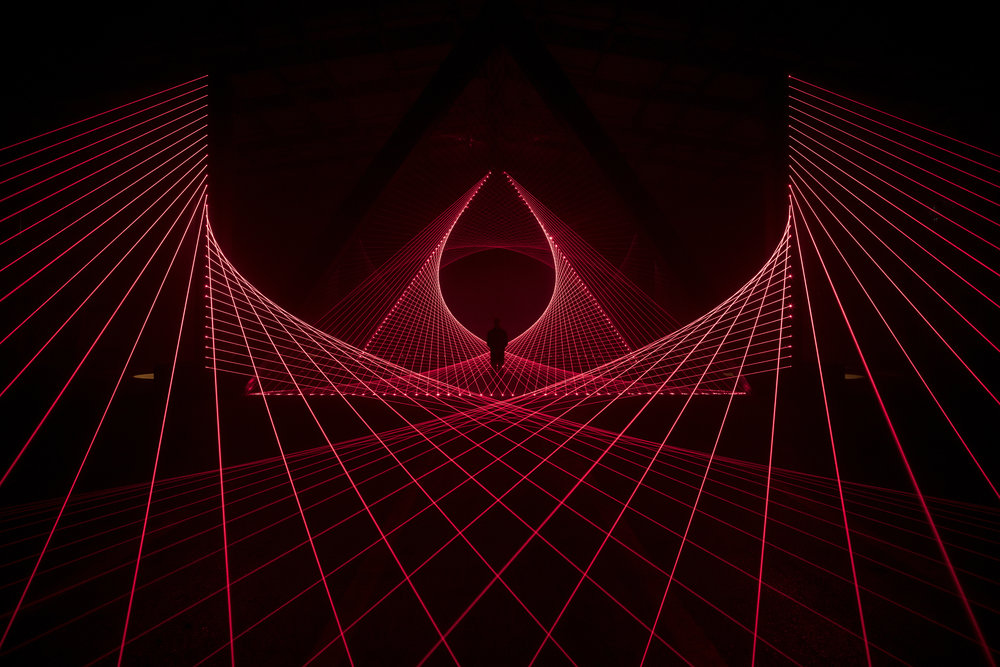
Leviathan at Dark MOFO by Matthew Schreiber

Matthew Schreiber (born 1967, Cleveland, Ohio) is an American artist who is known for his work in holography and for his large scale laser light sculptures. Matthew Schreiber produces work in a wide variety of mediums, including drawing, performance, sculpture, video, and light. Recurring subjects within Schreiber's work center on novelty, the occult, and spectacle by using tools of physics, technology and perception. He has exhibited his work internationally, and most recently at large music festivals, an example of which can be found in his 2018 installation at Dark MOFO in Tasmania, in which Schreiber created a massive laser-light installation that completely immersed viewers.

Schreiber attempted constructing his own laser at age 7, inspired by science fiction, fantasy and novelty shops. Schreiber received his MFA in Art and Technology and experimental film from the School of the Art Institute of Chicago with a specialization in holography from the Royal College of Art in 1994.

Upon completing his MFA in 1994, Matthew Schreiber relocated to Miami to develop C-Project, a holographic production studio, as the Art Director. C-Project produced fine art holograms with internationally recognized artists such as Louise Bourgeois. It was through his work with C-Project that Schreiber began to work with James Turrell, who he continued to work with for many years.

In 2008 Schreiber relocated to Brooklyn, NY building a new studio and holography laboratory. He created a refined archive of C-Project which was permanently acquired by the Getty Museum and GRI in 2019. Schreiber worked as James Turrell's chief lighting expert, culminating in Turrell's retrospective exhibition in 2013. Schreiber went on to produce several solo shows featuring his holograms, laser installations, and drawings, such as his 2008, Guilloche, at Fireplace Projects in East Hampton, NY, 2014, Side Show, at Johannes Vogt Gallery in New York, NY, and 2017 solo show at Cornell's Johnson Museum of Art, curated by Andrea Inselmann. Schreiber's first exhibition focused primarily on holography, Incense and Holograms, was in 2019 at Johannes Vogt Gallery.
