= Bahrain Financial Harbour =

- مرفأ البحرين المالي
- The Bahrain Financial Harbour towers in 2020

Record height
- Preceded by: Bahrain WTC

General information
- Status: Completed
- Type: Mixed use
- Location: Manama, Bahrain
- Coordinates: 26°14′16″N 50°34′24″E
- Construction started: 2004
- Completed: 2009
- Cost: US$1.5 billion +

Height
- Roof: 260 m (853 ft)

Technical details
- Floor count: 53 (4 basement floors)
- Floor area: 380,000 m^{2} (4,090,000 sq ft)
- Lifts/elevators: 2+

Design and construction
- Architect: AJ Architects
- Main contractor: Al Hamad Con. Co.

Other information
- Parking: 11,000

Website
- BFHarbour.com

Bahrain Financial Harbour (Arabic: مرفأ البحرين المالي, commonly abbreviated as BFH) is a waterfront commercial development project located on the northern shore of Manama, the capital city of Bahrain. Costing $1.5 billion and covering an area of 380,000 square metres, the two main Harbour Towers were officially opened in May 2007. It is now completed and is considered a beacon of engineering and design.

== Overview ==
The commercial complex is located on the northern shoreline of Manama, adjacent to the King Faisal Highway which links Manama to Saudi Arabia via the King Fahd Causeway. The majority of the project, like the nearby Bahrain Bay, is being constructed on reclaimed land on the former site of the Manama pier.

Construction of the Bahrain Financial Harbour started in 2003 and the two main Harbour Towers were completed in May 2007. However, construction of the rest of the project including the Bahrain Performance Centre, residential Diamond Tower and Villamar apartment buildings was delayed largely due to the Great Recession.

The BFH project consists of multiple construction phases such as:

=== Harbour Towers ===
The two tallest twin-towers, Harbour Tower East and Harbour Tower West, are listed as the second tallest completed towers in Bahrain, with a height of 260 m (853 ft) with 53 floors. The towers provide a total of 100,000 square metres of office space.

=== Harbour Gate ===
Also called Harbour Mall (harbour), it is a six-storey building that houses the Bahrain Stock Exchange and various investment firms. It has approximately 22,000 square metres of retail space and is connected to both Harbour Towers at the second floor.

=== Harbour Heights ===
The Harbour Heights Towers (formerly Villamar) are 3 residential skyscrapers located to the north of the Harbour Towers. The towers are 54, 43 and 52 storeys high and boast 437 apartments, 52 villas, and 17 penthouses in addition to a health club and restaurants. With a cost of $650 million, construction began in 2006 and was originally scheduled to be completed by 2009. However, repeated delays saw the project being put on hold in October 2011 due to the Bahrain uprising, the Great Recession, and a liquidity problem at the parent company, Gulf Holding Company. Construction briefly restarted in 2012 when it was estimated to have been halfway done before construction ceased again. The Bahraini government in 2015 formed a committee to oversee stalled projects in the country. In 2016, Gulf Finance House Financial Group announced that work on the towers would recommence in the same year.

=== Harbour Row ===
The project consists of a row of luxury homes alongside a commercial waterfront promenade. Construction of the $150 million project started in 2016 after its building permit was issued.

=== Unfinished projects ===
- Bahrain Performance Center
- Diamond Tower
- Dhow Harbour
- Residential North
- Residential South

== Tenants ==
- BNP Paribas
- Khaleeji Commercial Bank
- Gulf Finance House
- Newton Legal
- Baker & McKenzie
- Al-Tamimi & Company
- Ministry of Industry & Commerce
- PwC
- Embassy of Israel
- Bank Alfalah

== Gallery ==
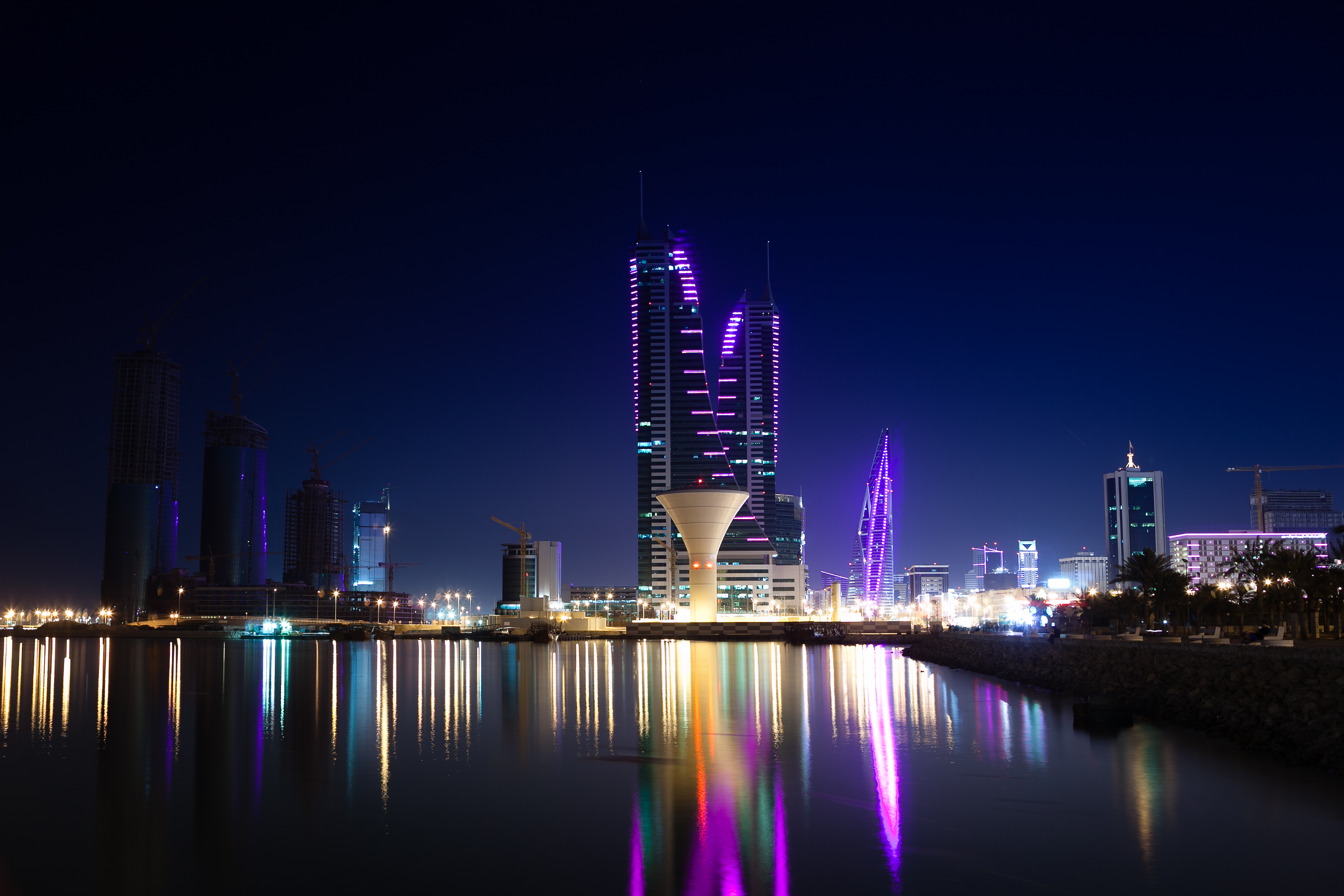
Bahrain Financial Harbour at night

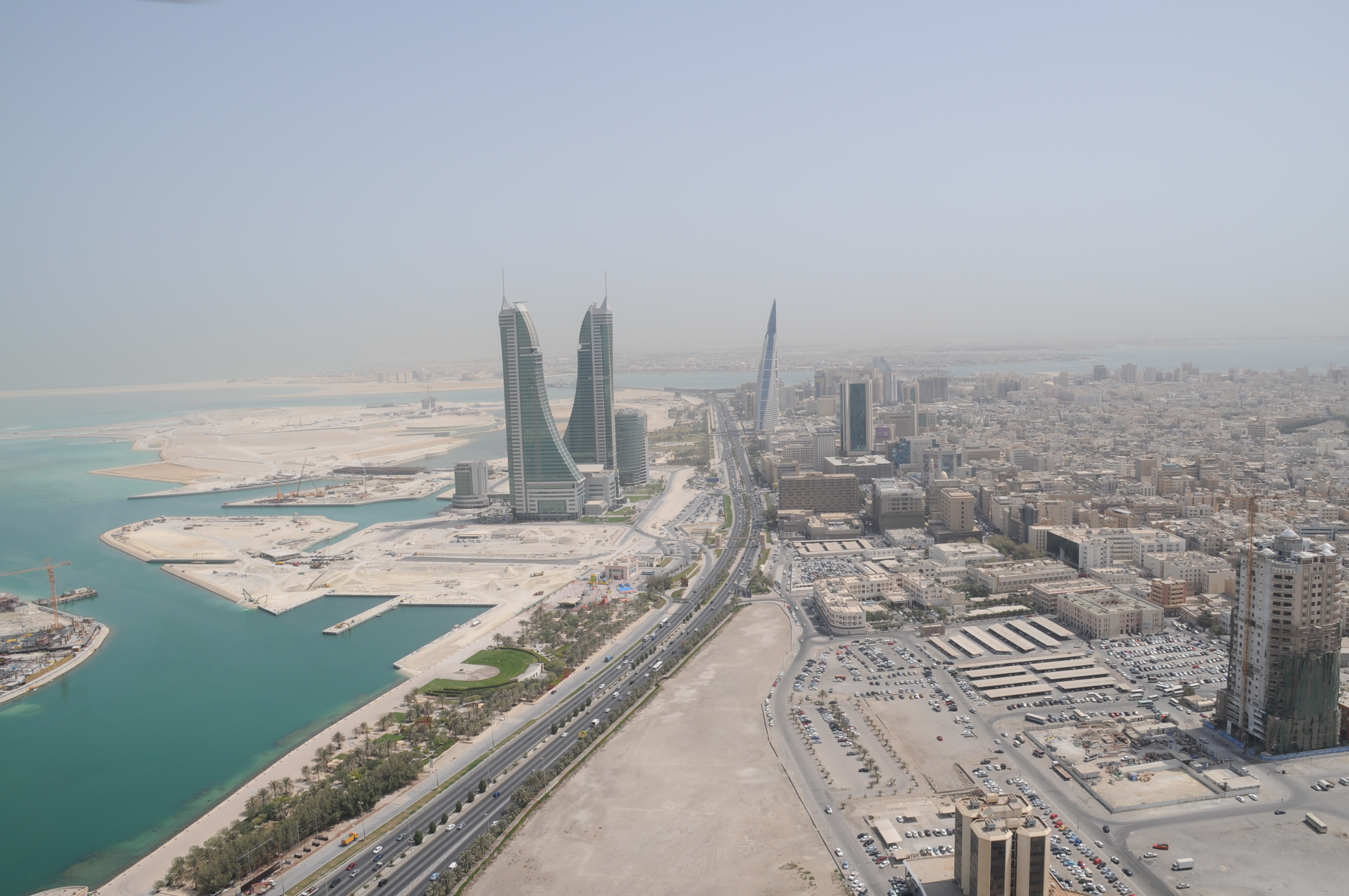
Overview of Manama

Close up view of the Harbour

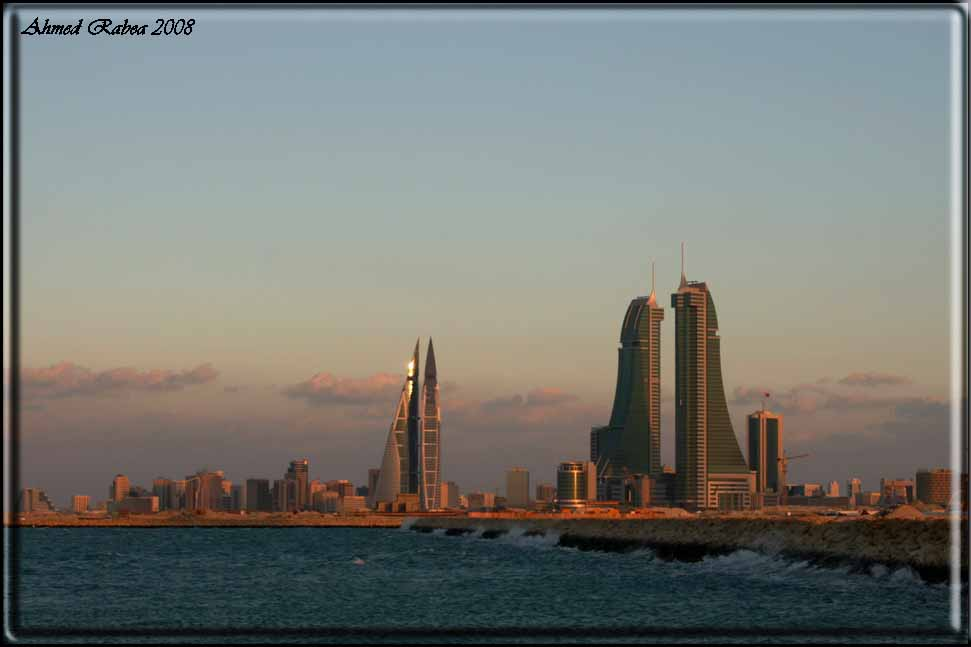
The Harbour and the Bahrain World Trade Centre

== See also ==
- List of tallest buildings and structures in Bahrain
- List of twin buildings and structures

Records
Preceded by Bahrain World Trade Center	Tallest building in Bahrain; 2009–2015; 260 metres (850 ft)	Succeeded by Four Seasons Hotel Manama
