= 924 Hajj caravan raid =

Qarmatian attack in Arabia

- Part of the wars between the Qarmatians and the Abbasid Caliphate
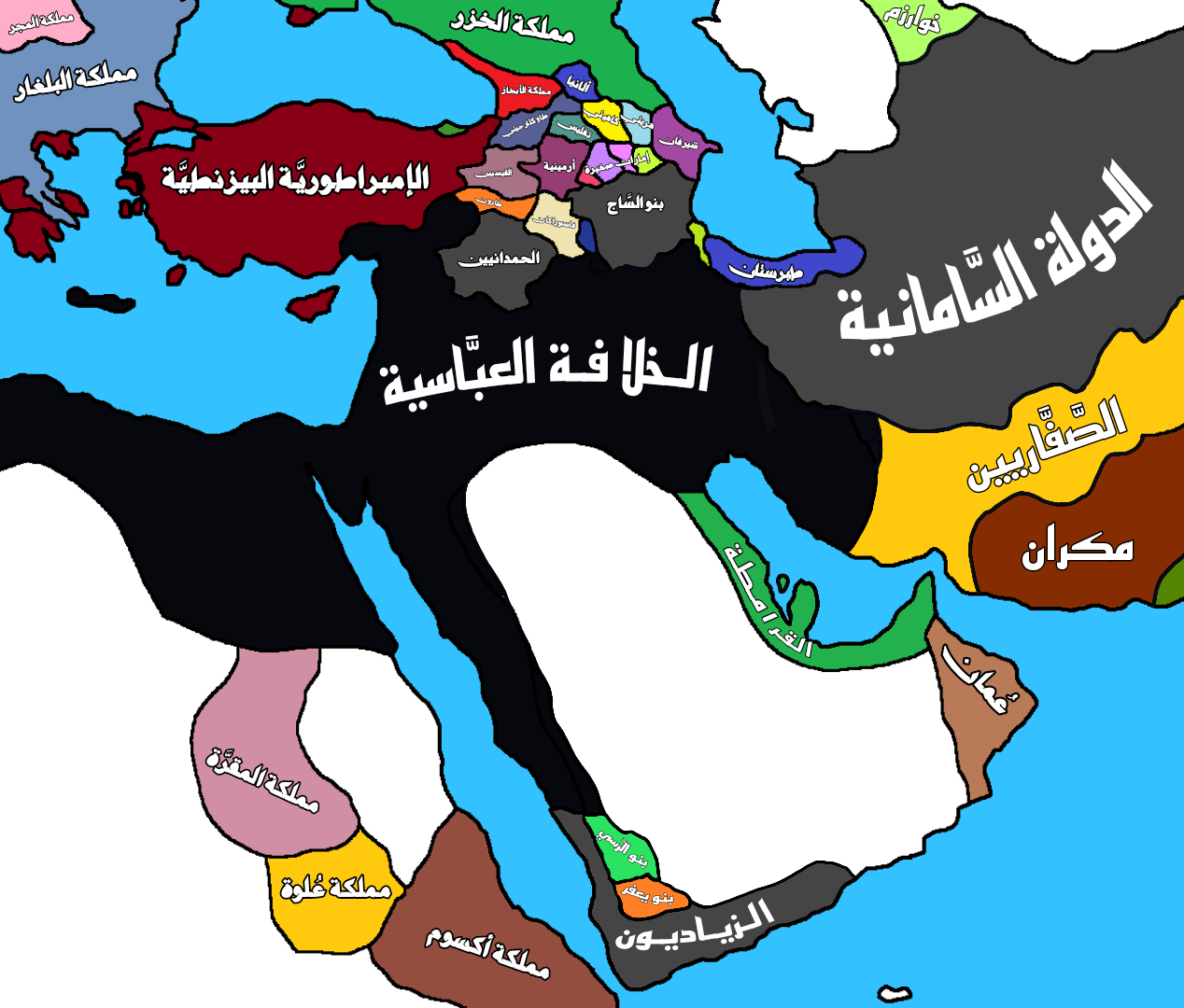
- Arabic map of the Middle East in 920 (4 years before the raid), including the Qarmatians
Date	March 924
Location	al-Habir, Arabia
Result	Qarmatian victory: Raid of the caravan by the Qarmatians

Belligerents
Qarmatians of Bahrayn	Abbasid Caliphate

Commanders and leaders
Abu Tahir al-Jannabi	Abu'l-Hayja al-Hamdani (POW)

Strength
1,800	Unknown

In March 924, the Qarmatians of Bahrayn attacked and looted a caravan of Hajj pilgrims making their way back from Mecca to Iraq. The Qarmatians overcame the caravan's armed escort and took many pilgrims prisoner, along with the escort commander, Abu'l-Hayja al-Hamdani, before releasing them for ransom. The raid, along with a recent failure to prevent a sack of Basra in August 923, led to popular unrest in Baghdad, and the deposition and execution of the Abbasid Caliphate's vizier, Ibn al-Furat.

== Background ==
In the 890s, the Isma'ili missionary Abu Sa'id al-Jannabi established an independent Qarmatian state in Bahrayn. During Abu Sa'id's rule, the Qarmatians of Bahrayn remained uninvolved in the Isma'ili uprisings of the 900s against the Abbasid Caliphate in Syria and Iraq, or in the establishment of the Isma'ili Fatimid Caliphate in Ifriqiya. Apart from a raid against Basra in 912, they also maintained peace with the Abbasids, receiving donations of money and weapons by the Abbasid vizier, Ali ibn Isa ibn al-Jarrah, in exchange.

In January 923, Abu Sa'id's youngest son, Abu Tahir al-Jannabi, having reached the age of 16, succeeded to the leadership of the Qarmatians. At the same time, Ali ibn Isa lost his position, and was replaced by his more hawkish rival, Ibn al-Furat, who favoured military action. Abu Tahir, evidently ambitious to make his mark, likely took this as a pretext to attack the Abbasids. His first action was to attack the great port city of Basra, which his troops sacked and plundered for over two weeks in August 923. Rather than reacting to the Qarmatian threat, Ibn al-Furat remained concerned with securing his own position at court, exiling or torturing and killing many of his potential rivals.

== Hajj raid ==
In March 924, the Hajj pilgrims set out on their return journeys from Mecca. The first caravan heading to Iraq was attacked and massacred by Abu Tahir and his men at al-Habir. News of this reached the subsequent caravans, which included several high officials and members of the Abbasid court, as they arrived at Faid, south of al-Habir. There they stopped, partly out of hesitation as to their course of action, and partly to allow the caravans following them to join up, so that together they might stand a better chance at confronting the Qarmatians. The commander of the escort, the Bedouin chieftain Abu'l-Hayja al-Hamdani, proposed to lead them via an alternative route to Wadi al-Qura, but the pilgrims refused his suggestion as it would entail too large a deviation. Once the supplies at Faid began to run out, the caravans set out toward al-Habir. As he was tasked with their protection, Abu'l-Hayja himself accompanied them.

At al-Habir, Abu Tahir, with 800 cavalry and 1,000 infantry, quickly overcame the pilgrims' resistance, killed many of them, and took many captives, including Abu'l-Hayja, the uncle of Caliph al-Muqtadir's mother, and other members of the court. The captives were transported to the Qarmatian capital at al-Ahsa, before they were released for large sums in ransom. The common pilgrims were largely left behind, but as the Qarmatians took their supplies and their camels, many perished of thirst and exhaustion while trying to reach settled areas. In addition, the Qarmatians took an enormous treasure in money, jewels, and precious items, including the shamsa, a large, suspended, jewel-studded ceremonial crown symbolizing the caliph's authority during the Hajj.

== Aftermath ==
The sack of Basra and the attack on the Hajj caravan, which fell in the same Islamic year (311 AH), led chroniclers to label it the "year of destruction" (sanat al-damār). Riots broke out in the streets of Baghdad against Ibn al-Furat, who now lost any support he might have had. Having alienated the civilian bureaucracy due to his torturing of former officials to extract money, and the military due to his failure to guarantee their salaries, the destruction of the Hajj caravan cost the vizier the backing of the common people as well. On 16 July, the vizier was deposed and executed, along with his son al-Muhassin, in what amounted to a military coup. The event marked the final ascendance of the military over the civilian bureaucracy, with dire consequences for the future.

The Qarmatians continued attacking Hajj caravans over the following years, and launched an invasion of Iraq in 927, which at one point threatened Baghdad itself and ranged as far as Upper Mesopotamia. In 930, the Qarmatians would even sack and pillage Mecca, but due to internal troubles, the Qarmatian threat eventually subsided, and peaceful relations were established between Bahrayn and the Abbasid Caliphate.

== Sources ==
- Amedroz, Henry F.; Margoliouth, David S., eds. (1921). The Eclipse of the 'Abbasid Caliphate. Original Chronicles of the Fourth Islamic Century, Vol. IV: The concluding portion of The Experiences of Nations by Miskawaihi, Vol. I: Reigns of Muqtadir, Qadir and Radi. Oxford: Basil Blackwell. OCLC 557740738.
- Daftary, Farhad (2007). The Ismāʿı̄lı̄s: Their History and Doctrines (Second ed.). Cambridge: Cambridge University Press. ISBN 978-0-521-61636-2.
- Halm, Heinz (1991). Das Reich des Mahdi: Der Aufstieg der Fatimiden [The Empire of the Mahdi: The Rise of the Fatimids] (in German). Munich: C. H. Beck. ISBN 978-3-406-35497-7.
- Halm, Heinz (1997). "S̲h̲amsa". In Bosworth, C. E.; van Donzel, E.; Heinrichs, W. P. & Lecomte, G. (eds.). The Encyclopaedia of Islam, Second Edition. Volume IX: San–Sze. Leiden: E. J. Brill. pp. 298–299. doi:10.1163/1573-3912_islam_SIM_6814. ISBN 978-90-04-10422-8.
- Kennedy, Hugh (2004) [1986]. The Prophet and the Age of the Caliphates: The Islamic Near East from the 6th to the 11th Century (Second ed.). Harlow: Longman. ISBN 978-0-582-40525-7.
- Kennedy, Hugh (2013). "The Reign of al-Muqtadir (295–320/908–32): A History". Crisis and Continuity at the Abbasid Court: Formal and Informal Politics in the Caliphate of al-Muqtadir (295-320/908-32). Leiden: Brill. pp. 13–47. ISBN 978-90-04-25271-4.
