= Sack of Mecca =

Qarmatian attack on the Abbasids

Sack of Mecca (930)
- Part of the wars between the Qarmatians and the Abbasid Caliphate
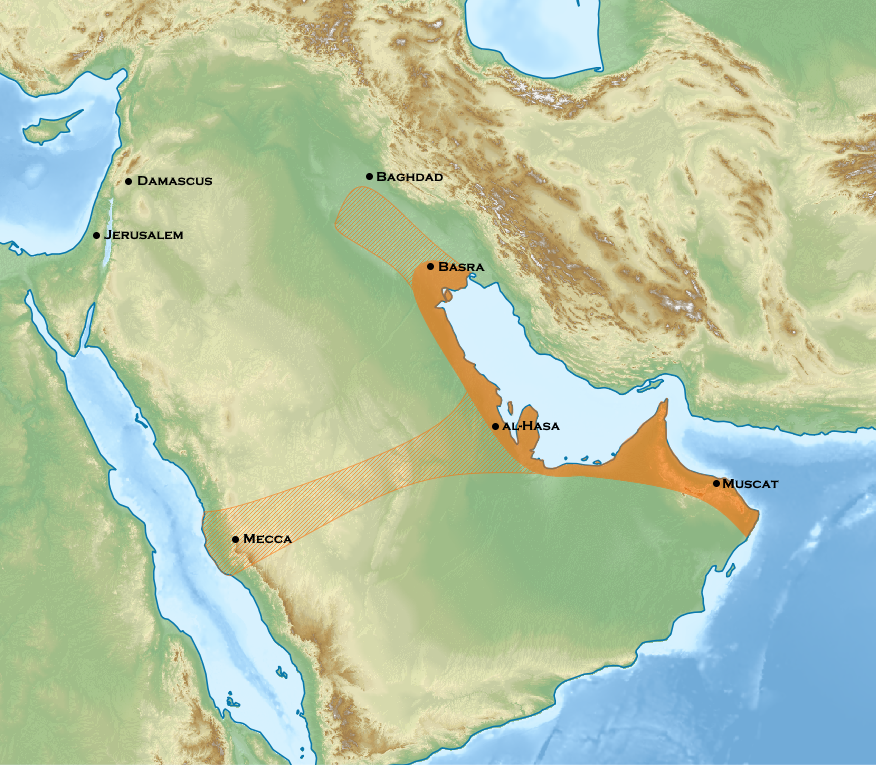
- Map of Arabia in 930. Qarmatian territory in orange
Date	11 January 930
Location	Mecca, Abbasid Caliphate
Result	Qarmatian victory

Belligerents
Qarmatians: Banu Amir	Abbasid Caliphate

Commanders and leaders
Abu Tahir al-Jannabi	Muhammad ibn Isma'il †

The Sack of Mecca occurred on 11 January 930, when the Qarmatians of Bahrayn sacked the Muslim holy city amidst the rituals of the Hajj pilgrimage.

The Qarmatians, a radical Isma'ili sect established in Bahrayn since the turn of the 9th century, had previously attacked the caravans of Hajj pilgrims and even invaded and raided Iraq, the heartland of the Abbasid Caliphate, in 927–928. In 928, the Qarmatian leader Abu Tahir al-Jannabi became convinced that the long-awaited mahdi, the messiah who would usher in the end times and nullify existing religious law, had arrived in the person of a young Persian man, Abu'l-Fadl al-Isfahani. As a result, al-Jannabi led his men against Mecca in the Hajj season of winter 929–930.

The Qarmatians gained entry into the city ostensibly to perform their pilgrimage, but immediately turned to attacking the pilgrims. The city was plundered for eight to eleven days, many of the pilgrims were killed and their bodies left unburied, while even the Kaaba, the holiest site of Islam, was ransacked and all its decorations and relics were taken away to Bahrayn, including the Black Stone. This act was tantamount to a complete break between the Qarmatians and the Islamic world, and was followed in 931 by the revelation of al-Isfahani as God manifest before the Qarmatian faithful. However, it soon became apparent that the mahdi was nothing of the sort, and he was murdered. Islamic law was restored in Bahrayn, and the Qarmatians entered into negotiations with the Abbasid government, which resulted in the conclusion of a peace treaty in 939, and eventually the return of the Black Stone to Mecca in 951.

== Background ==
=== Origins of the Qarmatians of Bahrayn ===
In the 880s and 890s, the Isma'ili Shi'a missionary Abu Sa'id al-Jannabi had established a strong following among the Bedouin tribes of Bahrayn. In 899, the Isma'ili movement split between a branch that followed the leadership of the future Fatimid caliph, Abdallah al-Mahdi, and those who rejected his claims to the imamate, known as the "Qarmatians". Whether out of genuine conviction or political expediency, Abu Sa'id sided with the latter faction. Allied with the local Bedouin tribes of the Banu Kilab and Banu Uqayl, as well as with the Persian Gulf merchants, Abu Sa'id was able to capture the region's capital, and in 900 cemented its independence by defeating an Abbasid army sent to recover control of Bahrayn.

Under Abu Sa'id's rule, the Qarmatians of Bahrayn remained uninvolved in the unsuccessful Isma'ili uprisings of the 900s against the Sunni Abbasid Caliphate in Syria and Iraq, or in the establishment of the Fatimid Caliphate in Ifriqiya. Apart from a raid against Basra in 912, they also retained peace with the Abbasids, secured through donations of money and weapons sent by the Abbasid vizier, Ali ibn Isa ibn al-Jarrah. Abu Sa'id was assassinated in 913/4, and succeeded, at least nominally, by all of his sons collectively. The oldest, Abu'l-Qasim Sa'id al-Jannabi, was at first the pre-eminent, but his reign was brief; he was replaced by the more ambitious and warlike youngest son, Abu Tahir al-Jannabi, in 923.

=== Abu Tahir and the war with the Abbasids ===
Under the leadership of the 16-year-old Abu Tahir, the Qarmatians began raids against the Abbasid Caliphate with a surprise attack on Basra in August 923. The city was plundered for 17 days, until the Qarmatians left, unmolested, and with an enormous train of booty and slaves. In March 924, the Qarmatians destroyed the Hajj caravan making its way back from Mecca to Baghdad, taking many notables of the Abbasid court captive.

The Abbasid government's response to the Qarmatian attacks was ineffectual: the Qarmatian raiding parties were small, but highly mobile, ensuring that any Abbasid military response arrived too late. At the same time, the Qarmatian base in Bahrayn was safe from Abbasid retaliation. Factional rivalries in the Abbasid court, most notably between the vizier, Ibn al-Furat, and the commander-in-chief, Mu'nis al-Muzaffar, further hampered an effective response.

The Hajj caravan of 925 was attacked on its way to Mecca, and despite an escort of 6,000 men had to turn back to Kufa pursued by the Qarmatians, taking heavy losses. The Qarmatians demanded the surrender of Basra and of Khuzistan, and when they were refused, they entered Kufa and pillaged it for seven days. The plunder was on such a level that even the city's iron gates were dismantled and taken back to Bahrayn.

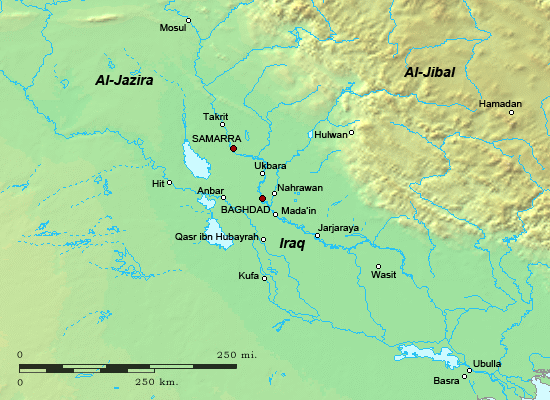
Map of Iraq in the 9th–10th centuries

In the next Hajj season, in January 926, a strong military escort ensured the safety of the pilgrims, but the authorities paid a hefty sum to the Qarmatians to be allowed through. During the following Hajj, the caravan had to be called off entirely as the Abbasid government lacked the funds to provide the escort, and panic spread in Mecca as its inhabitants deserted the city in anticipation of a Qarmatian attack that never came.

=== Qarmatian invasion of Iraq and the discovery of the mahdi ===
Instead, in October/November 927 the Qarmatians under Abu Tahir invaded Iraq: Kufa was captured and local Shi'a sympathizers declared the end of the Abbasid dynasty and the imminent arrival of the Islamic messiah, the mahdi. The Qarmatians at the time expected the arrival of the mahdi, and the start of the final age of the world, in 928, when the planets Saturn and Jupiter would be in conjunction.

The Qarmatian march on Baghdad was stopped when the Abbasids breached the canals, flooding the fields, and tearing down the bridges leading to the Abbasid capital. The Qarmatians withdrew back across the Euphrates, but continued north along the river into Upper Mesopotamia, raiding as they went and extracting ransoms from the local cities.

Finally, in the summer of 928, the Qarmatians retreated to their homes in Bahrayn, with Abu Tahir leaving behind a poem in which he promised to return, and describing himself as the herald of the mahdi. The preparations for the return of the mahdi gathered pace: a fortified dar al-hijra was built at the Al-Ahsa Oasis, and many Shi'a sympathizers joined the Qarmatians on their return, eager to be present at the mahdi's arrival.

Among the captives taken in the invasion was a young Persian named Abu'l-Fadl al-Isfahani, taken at Qasr Ibn Hubayra; this boy, about twenty years old and of haughty demeanor, was recognized by Abu Tahir as the awaited mahdi.

== Massacre of the pilgrims and plundering of the city ==
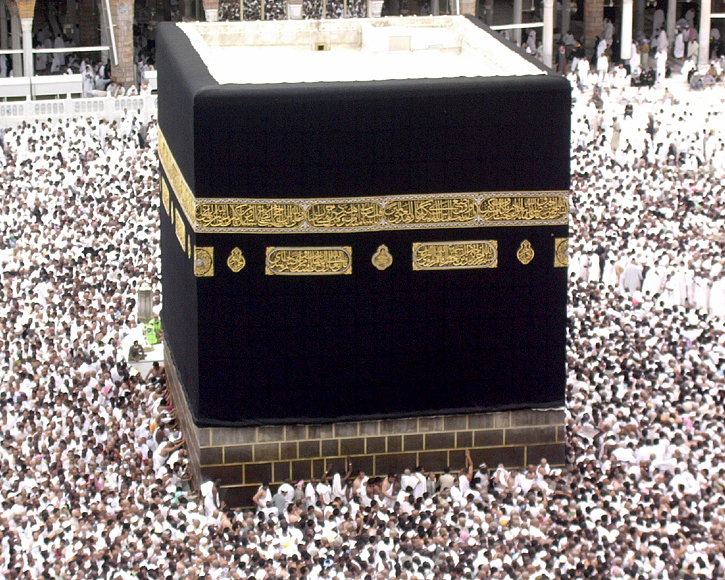
The Kaaba (pictured here during the Hajj in 2003)

In 929, after several years of interruption, the Hajj caravans were resumed under military escort, arriving in Mecca in December 929. On 11 January, the day when the Hajj rites were to begin, a Qarmatian army under Abu Tahir appeared before the city. The local garrison initially tried to stop them, but Abu Tahir claimed his right of entry as a Muslim and gave a pledge of safety for the city and everyone in it.

Once Abu Tahir and his men were in the city, however, they began killing the pilgrims assembled for the ritual circling of the Kaaba, while their leaders mockingly exclaimed Quranic verses promising divine protection through the Kaaba. The corpses were left untended and unburied, while some were thrown into the sacred Zamzam Well. The governor of Mecca, Muhammad ibn Isma'il, known as Ibn Muharib, was among those killed.

The Qarmatians plundered the Kaaba, emptying it of its relics and stripping it of its precious objects and decorations; even the doors were taken away, and only the gold waterspout on the roof was left in place. Finally, the Black Stone was dislodged and carried off. Abu Tahir is said to have composed a poem proclaiming that "This house [the Kaaba] does not belong to God, for God never chooses a house for Himself".

One report, considered exaggerated by modern scholars, suggests that the plunder from the Kaaba alone was so enormous that it required fifty camels to be transported back to Bahrayn. Of the relics kept in Mecca, only the Maqam Ibrahim was rescued, being smuggled out of the city. According to at least one account, some of the city's inhabitants joined in the massacre, attacking the pilgrims. The Qarmatians continued their killing and plundering for eight to eleven days, retiring to their camp outside the city each night, and returning the next day. On their return journey, the Qarmatians were ambushed by the Banu Hudhayl tribe as part of a larger conflict between both parties, the latter was able to liberate many of the prisoners and recovered much of the loot before the Qarmatians managed to escape.

== Motives for the attack ==
The motivation of the Qarmatians for this attack, and for the stealing of the Black Stone, remains somewhat unclear. According to the historian Hugh N. Kennedy, "They must certainly have hoped for concessions from the government in exchange for [the Black Stone's] return and may even have hoped to divert the Hajj, with the trading opportunities it presented, to their own capital at [al-Ahsa]". However, the supposition that the Qarmatians intended to divert the Hajj to al-Ahsa has been challenged by several historians, including one of the first modern scholars of Isma'ilism, Michael Jan de Goeje.

As the historian Heinz Halm points out, the attack was not a mere raid against 'unbelievers' or the Abbasids, who were considered usurpers by the Qarmatians: the sack of the Kaaba was an act of sacrilege that effectively broke the ties between the Qarmatians and Islam. Qarmatian doctrine preached that all previous revealed religions—Judaism, Christianity, and Islam itself—and their scriptures were but veils: they imposed outer (zahir) forms and rules that were meant to conceal the inner (batin), true religion as it had been practiced in Paradise. The coming of the mahdi would not only herald the end times, but would also reveal these esoteric truths (haqa'iq) and release mankind from the outward strictures of religious law (shari'a). The mocking recitation of suras is explained by Halm as the apparent desire of the Qarmatians to "prove the Quranic revelation wrong", and the sack of Mecca is consistent with their belief that with the coming of the mahdi as God manifest on Earth, all previous religions were shown as false, so that they and their symbols had to be abjured. According to the historian Farhad Daftary, the transfer of the Black Stone to al-Ahsa was "presumably to symbolize the end of the era of Islam" and the start of the new messianic age. While al-Isfahani was not publicly revealed until 931, Halm argues that the events of 930 are likely linked with the messianic expectations placed in him by Abu Tahir and were meant to set the stage for the emergence of the mahdi.

== Aftermath ==
The sack of Mecca and the desecration of the most holy Muslim sites caused immense shock and outrage in the Muslim world, and exposed the weakness of the Abbasid government. Both the Abbasids and the Fatimid caliph, Abdallah al-Mahdi, sent letters to Abu Tahir in reproach, and urged the immediate return of the Black Stone. The letters were disregarded, and Abu Tahir proceeded to expand his power: after conquering Oman, he seemed poised to repeat his invasion of Iraq, but although his men captured and plundered Kufa for 25 days in 931, he suddenly turned back to Bahrayn.

The reason was likely the increasingly bizarre and autocratic behaviour of al-Isfahani, who was worshipped as a living god and had several leading Qarmatians executed. This aroused resistance, including from Abu Tahir's own mother; the supposed mahdi was put to the test, revealed to be incapable of performing miracles, and was murdered. Abu Tahir was able to retain power over Bahrayn, and the Qarmatian leadership denounced the entire episode as an error and reverted to its previous adherence to Islamic law. The affair of the false Mahdi damaged the reputation of Abu Tahir and shattered the morale of the Qarmatians, many of whom abandoned Bahrayn to seek service in the armies of various regional warlords.

Over the following years, the Qarmatians of Bahrayn entered into negotiations with the Abbasid government, resulting in the conclusion of a peace treaty in 939, and eventually the return of the Black Stone to Mecca in 951. These events marked, in the words of Hugh Kennedy, "the assimilation of the Qarmati state into the Muslim political order". As the dominant power in the eastern and northern Arabian peninsula, the Qarmatians even began offering their services as—well paid—guards of the Hajj caravans; when the Bedouin tribe of the Banu Sulaym raided the caravans in 966, the Qarmatians forced them to return their plunder. When the Fatimid conquest of Egypt and the subsequent Fatimid invasion of the Levant threatened to disrupt this profitable enterprise, the Qarmatian leader al-Hasan al-A'sam did not hesitate to make common cause with the Abbasids against the rival Isma'ili empire; in the cities taken from the Fatimids, the Qarmatians even had the Friday sermon read in the name of the Abbasid caliph al-Muti. In the end, the Fatimids prevailed, and by 975 Qarmatian power in the region was broken for good.

== Sources ==
- Daftary, Farhad (2007). The Ismāʿı̄lı̄s: Their History and Doctrines (Second ed.). Cambridge: Cambridge University Press. ISBN 978-0-521-61636-2.
- Halm, Heinz (1991). Das Reich des Mahdi: Der Aufstieg der Fatimiden [The Empire of the Mahdi: The Rise of the Fatimids] (in German). Munich: C. H. Beck. ISBN 978-3-406-35497-7.
- Halm, Heinz (2003). Die Kalifen von Kairo: Die Fatimiden in Ägypten, 973–1074 [The Caliphs of Cairo: The Fatimids in Egypt, 973–1074] (in German). Munich: C. H. Beck. ISBN 3-406-48654-1.
- Kennedy, Hugh (2013). "The Reign of al-Muqtadir (295–320/908–32): A History". Crisis and Continuity at the Abbasid Court: Formal and Informal Politics in the Caliphate of al-Muqtadir (295–320/908–32). Leiden: Brill. pp. 13–47. doi:10.1163/9789004252707_003. ISBN 978-90-04-25271-4.
- Kennedy, Hugh (2023) [1986]. The Prophet and the Age of the Caliphates: The Islamic Near East from the 6th to the 11th Century (Fourth ed.). Abingdon, Oxon and New York: Routledge. ISBN 978-0-367-36690-2.
- Madelung, Wilferd (1996). "The Fatimids and the Qarmatīs of Bahrayn". In Daftary, Farhad (ed.). Mediaeval Isma'ili History and Thought. Cambridge University Press. pp. 21–73. ISBN 978-0-521-00310-0.
- Rezazadeh Langaroodi, Reza (2015). "Abū Ṭāhir al-Jannābī". In Madelung, Wilferd; Daftary, Farhad (eds.). Encyclopaedia Islamica Online. Translated by Farzin Negahban. Brill Online. ISSN 1875-9831.
- Morrow, John (2023). Shi'ism in the Maghrib and Al-Andalus. Vol. 1. Cambridge Scholars Publishing. ISBN 9781527598812.
