= Sack of Basra (923) =

923 Sack of a city in Southern Iraq by the Qarmatians

- Part of the wars between the Qarmatians and the Abbasid Caliphate
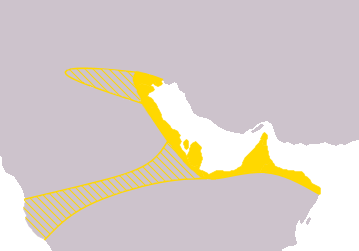
- Map of the Qarmatians in yellow.Including Basra, the region in Iraq that was invaded by the Qarmatians.
Date	11–28 August 923
Location	Basra, Abbasid Caliphate
Result	Qarmatian victory: Basra looted and mass killing and enslavement of civilians

Belligerents
Qarmatians of Bahrayn	Abbasid Caliphate

Commanders and leaders
Abu Tahir al-Jannabi	Sabuk al-Muflihi †

Strength
1,700	Unknown

The Sack of Basra was the capture and looting of the Abbasid city of Basra by the Qarmatians of Bahrayn, and took place in August 923. It was the first of a series of Qarmatian attacks, that culminated in an invasion of Iraq in 927–928.

== Background ==
In the 890s, the Isma'ili missionary Abu Sa'id al-Jannabi had established an independent Qarmatian state in Bahrayn. Under Abu Sa'id's rule, the Qarmatians of Bahrayn remained uninvolved in the Qarmatian uprisings of the 900s against the Abbasid Caliphate in Syria and Iraq, or in the establishment of the Fatimid Caliphate in Ifriqiya. Apart from a raid against Basra in 912, they also retained peace with the Abbasids, helped by donations of money and weapons by the Abbasid vizier, Ali ibn Isa ibn al-Jarrah.

In January 923, Abu Sa'id's youngest son, Abu Tahir al-Jannabi, having reached the age of 16, succeeded to the leadership of the Qarmatians. At the same time, Ali ibn Isa lost his position, and was replaced by his more hawkish rival, Ibn al-Furat, who favoured military action. Abu Tahir, evidently ambitious to make his mark, likely took this as a pretext to attack the Abbasids.

== Sack of Basra ==
Barely four days after Ibn al-Furat's deposition, on 11 August 923, some 1,700 Qarmatians under Abu Tahir attacked Basra during the night. They used ladders to climb the walls, overpowered the gate guards and jammed the gates open with sand and stones so that they would not be trapped inside. Thinking that this was a Bedouin raid, the local governor, Sabuk al-Muflihi, went out with his men to meet the assailants without caution, and was killed. After his death, his family was enslaved. The Basrans resisted bravely, but without military support they were defeated and killed en mass by the Qarmatians without mercy. The Qarmatians massacred unarmed Abbasid soldiers and pillaged the city unmolested for 17 days, carrying off much booty, and many captives to be sold as slaves, including many women and children.

Only after they had left did Abbasid troops arrive on the scene. This would be a common theme in the Abbasid military response to the Qarmatian raids: the Qarmatian raiding parties were small, but highly mobile, ensuring that they would escape before the arrival of any Abbasid military response. At the same time, the Qarmatian base in Bahrayn was safe from Abbasid retaliation.

== Aftermath ==
Rather than reacting to the Qarmatian threat, Ibn al-Furat was more concerned with securing his own position at court, exiling or torturing and killing many of his potential rivals. In March 924, however, the Qarmatians attacked the Hajj caravan making its way back from Mecca to Baghdad, overcame its escort, and took many of the pilgrims captive. The two events, which fell in the same Islamic year (311 AH), led chroniclers to label it the "year of destruction" (sanat al-damār). Riots broke out in the streets of Baghdad against Ibn al-Furat, who now lost any support he might have had. On 16 July the vizier was deposed and executed, along with his son al-Muhassin. The event marked the final ascendance of the military over the civilian bureaucracy, with dire consequences for the future.

The Qarmatians continued attacking Hajj caravans over the following years, before setting out to an invasion of Iraq itself in 927, which at one point threatened Baghdad itself and ranged as far as Upper Mesopotamia. In 930, the Qarmatians would even sack and pillage Mecca, but due to internal troubles, the Qarmatian threat subsided, and peaceful relations were established between Bahrayn and the Abbasid Caliphate.

== Sources ==
- Daftary, Farhad (2007). The Ismāʿı̄lı̄s: Their History and Doctrines (Second ed.). Cambridge: Cambridge University Press. ISBN 978-0-521-61636-2.
- Halm, Heinz (1991). Das Reich des Mahdi: Der Aufstieg der Fatimiden [The Empire of the Mahdi: The Rise of the Fatimids] (in German). Munich: C. H. Beck. ISBN 978-3-406-35497-7.
- Kennedy, Hugh (2001). The Armies of the Caliphs: Military and Society in the Early Islamic State. London and New York: Routledge. ISBN 0-415-25093-5.
- Kennedy, Hugh (2004) [1986]. The Prophet and the Age of the Caliphates: The Islamic Near East from the 6th to the 11th Century (Second ed.). Harlow: Longman. ISBN 978-0-582-40525-7.
- Kennedy, Hugh (2013). "The Reign of al-Muqtadir (295–320/908–32): A History". Crisis and Continuity at the Abbasid Court: Formal and Informal Politics in the Caliphate of al-Muqtadir (295–320/908–32). Leiden: Brill. pp. 13–47. ISBN 978-90-04-25271-4.
