= Abdallah ibn Hamdan =

Abbasid military commander

Abu'l-Hayja Abdallah ibn Hamdan (Arabic: أبو الهيجاء عبد الله بن حمدان; died 929) was an early member of the Hamdanid dynasty, who served the Abbasid Caliphate as a military commander and governor of Mosul (in 905/06–913/14, 914/15, and again in 925–29). Esteemed for his qualities, he was involved in the court intrigues at Baghdad, and played a leading role in the brief usurpation of al-Qahir in February 929, during which he was killed. His sons, Nasir al-Dawla and Sayf al-Dawla, went on to found the Hamdanid emirates of Mosul and Aleppo.

== Life ==
Abdallah was a son of the patriarch of the Hamdanid dynasty, the Taghlibi chieftain Hamdan ibn Hamdun, and a Kurdish woman. After the family entered Abbasid service at the turn of the 10th century, Abdallah was appointed governor of Mosul in 905/6. From this position, he fought against the local Kurdish tribes.

In 908, he was ordered to pursue his brother, Husayn, who had been involved in the failed usurpation of Ibn al-Mu'tazz, but failed to capture him. Instead, their brother Ibrahim negotiated a pardon for Husayn, who was readmitted to Abbasid service. In 913/4 he was removed from office, whereupon he rose in a short-lived revolt; he surrendered to the Abbasid commander-in-chief, Mu'nis al-Muzaffar, and was reinstated as governor in the next year. The reason for his initial dismissal is unknown. In 914–915, his brother Husayn rose in revolt, was defeated by Mu'nis, captured and brought to Baghdad, where he was executed in 918. As a result, Abdallah too fell under suspicion, and was briefly imprisoned, along with his brother Ibrahim.

Family tree of the Hamdanid dynasty

Released shortly after, Abdallah joined Mu'nis in a campaign against the rebellious governor of Adharbayjan, Yusuf ibn Abi'l-Saj in 919, and in 920 received governorship of the districts of Tariq Khurasan and Dinawar. In 923/4, he was tasked with protecting the Hajj routes against the Qarmatians. On the return from Mecca to Baghdad, the Hajj caravan was attacked by the Qarmatians under Abu Tahir Sulayman. Abdallah was taken prisoner along with many important court personages, but he managed to negotiate his own release and that of the other captives in the next year. Finally, in 925 he was reappointed to Mosul, receiving in addition the regions of Bazabda and Qarda east of the Tigris.

As a prominent member of the Abbasid court, Abdallah was mostly absent from Mosul, instead entrusting the region to his son al-Hasan as his deputy. During these years, the Hamdanids were allied with Mu'nis; on one occasion, Abdallah and his brothers promised to fight for him "until his beard grew" (Mu'nis was a eunuch). In 927, the Qarmatians invaded Iraq, threatening Baghdad itself, and Abdallah, with his surviving brothers, joined the Abbasid army sent against them. The sources credit Abdallah with playing a major role in the repulse of the Qarmatian attack; especially with the idea of destroying the bridge over the Nahr Zubara, thus preventing the Qarmatians from advancing onto Baghdad.

Harun ibn Gharib, a cousin of al-Muqtadir who aimed to supplant Mu'nis as commander-in-chief and succeeded in being named governor of the Jibal, dismissed Abdallah from his governorship of Dinawar, which enraged the Hamdanid and caused him to come with his troops to Baghdad, to avenge himself on Harun. This grievance led him to ally with the police chief of Baghdad, Nazuk, and together they began to turn Mu'nis against Harun and the caliph. Al-Muqtadir readily gave in to Mu'nis' demands to banish Harun, but the conspirators, driven by Nazuk, now determined to depose the caliph outright. On the morning of 27 February 929, they invaded the palace and deposed al-Muqtadir in favour of his half-brother, al-Qahir. For his role, Abdallah secured an extensive governorship, but within a few days, opposition to the new regime arose, and al-Qahir and his supporters were besieged in the caliphal palace. Abdallah was killed there, defending al-Qahir, whom he had sworn to protect (and who would actually reign as caliph in 932–934). His qualities as an honest and generous man and a brave warrior were universally admired, so that even the restored caliph, al-Muqtadir, issued a pardon for him in hopes that he might be taken alive, and then mourned his death.

== Descendants ==
His son al-Hasan, better known as Nasir al-Dawla, managed to secure rule over Mosul and of Upper Mesopotamia, and founded a quasi-independent emirate there. Like his father, he involved himself in the court intrigues of Baghdad, and even managed to take control of the city, and of the Abbasid caliph, in 942, but without lasting success. His descendants ruled Mosul until replaced by the Uqaylids in 990. Abdallah's younger son Ali, better known as Sayf al-Dawla, would go on to establish his own emirate in Aleppo and northern Syria in the mid-940s, and became famous as a champion of Islam against the Byzantine Empire and as a patron of the arts and letters at his court. The Hamdanids ruled Aleppo until 1002.

== Sources ==
- Bowen, Harold (1928). The Life and Times of ʿAlí Ibn ʿÍsà, ‘The Good Vizier’. Cambridge: Cambridge University Press.
- Canard, Marius (1971). "Ḥamdānids". In Lewis, B.; Ménage, V. L.; Pellat, Ch. & Schacht, J. (eds.). The Encyclopaedia of Islam, Second Edition. Volume III: H–Iram. Leiden: E. J. Brill. pp. 126–131. OCLC 495469525.
- Kennedy, Hugh (2004) [1986]. The Prophet and the Age of the Caliphates: The Islamic Near East from the 6th to the 11th Century (Second ed.). Harlow: Longman. ISBN 978-0-582-40525-7.
- Kennedy, Hugh (2006). When Baghdad Ruled the Muslim World: The Rise and Fall of Islam's Greatest Dynasty. Cambridge, MA: Da Capo Press. ISBN 978-0-306-81480-8.
