= Shamsa (crown) =

Ceremonial Crown

The shamsa (Arabic: شمسة) was a ceremonial crown that formed part of the regalia of the Abbasid and Fatimid caliphates.

Earlier scholarly opinion was that it was a ceremonial parasol, but it is now known to have been a gigantic suspended crown made of gold or silver and studded with pearls and precious stones. It was based on the ceremonial crown that was similarly suspended over the head of the pre-Islamic Sasanian kings of Persia. Under the Abbasids, the shamsa symbolically represented the absent caliph during the official Hajj observances while the amir al-hajj was personally in charge of the pilgrim caravan. Once the pilgrims had reached Mecca, the shamsa would be hung up in front of the Kaaba, but taken down after the Day of Arafat and the start of the Hajj ceremonies.

Several different shamsas are known to have been made. The first was commissioned by the Abbasid caliph al-Mutawakkil in the mid-9th century, and inlaid with precious stones by al-Mu'tadid half a century later. It was eventually carried off by the Qarmatian leader Abu Tahir al-Jannabi during the 924 Hajj caravan raid. The second was made by the Egyptian regent Abu al-Misk Kafur for the Ikhshidid prince Unujur. After the Fatimid conquest of Egypt, the Fatimid general Jawhar had it replaced with a new, bigger one. Jawhar's shamsa is described in detail by the Fatimid historian Ibn Zulaq: it was four times larger than its predecessors, formed of twelve golden crescents, with a diameter of over two meters, and decorated with fifty pearls, rubies, topazes and sapphires as large as doves' eggs; Quranic verses concerning the Hajj were written using emeralds, and filled out with pearls; and the bottom of the crown was covered with red brocades that were filled with camphor. Jawhar's shamsa was lost when the Fatimid treasury was looted in 1068; a fourth, unfinished shamsa was also taken at the same time.
