= Baqliyya =

Subgroup of Qarmatians in Southern Iraq

The Baqliyya or Būrāniyya were a subgroup of the Qarmatians that was active in southern Iraq in the early 10th century.

The group emerged after the defeat of the Qarmatian revolt of Zikrawayh ibn Mihrawayh by the Abbasid Caliphate in 907. Zikrawayh died, but many of his followers in the Sawad (the fertile rural region around Kufa) believed that he was not dead and would return to lead them. In 907/908, a Zutt dā'ī (an Isma'ili missionary) called Abu Hatim al-Zutti was active in the Sawad, and prohibited his followers from eating garlic, leeks, and turnips, slaughtering animals, and following certain customary Islamic religious observances. From this his followers they derived the nickname Baqiliyya, which soon was used to generally refer to the Qarmatians of the Sawad. The followers of Zikrawayh were soon joined by the followers of Hamdan Qarmat and Abu Muhammad Abdan, who still believed in the return of Muhammad ibn Isma'il as the Mahdi.

This movement survived, and even staged a few uprisings against the Abbasids in the areas around Kufa and Wasit, under Mas'ud ibn Hurayth and Abu Muhammad Abdan's nephew, Isa ibn Musa. When the Qarmatians of Bahrayn under Abu Tahir al-Jannabi invaded Iraq in 927, they rose in revolt, but were defeated by the Abbasid general Harun ibn Gharib. Their banners are described as being white, with inscriptions from the Quran on the redemption of the Israelites from the oppression of Pharaoh. A number of Qarmatians of Persian origin joined the Bahraynis and then followed them to their homeland, where they became known as the Ajamiyyūn.

== See also ==
- Islamic schools and branches

== Sources ==
- Daftary, Farhad (2012). "Baqliyya". Historical Dictionary of the Ismailis. Scarecrow Press. pp. 29–30. ISBN 978-0810861640.
- Hodgson, M. G. S. (1960). "Baḳliyya". In Gibb, H. A. R.; Kramers, J. H.; Lévi-Provençal, E.; Schacht, J.; Lewis, B. & Pellat, Ch. (eds.). The Encyclopaedia of Islam, Second Edition. Volume I: A–B. Leiden: E. J. Brill. p. 962. doi:10.1163/1573-3912_islam_SIM_1109. OCLC 495469456.
- Madelung, Wilferd (1978). "Ḳarmaṭī". In van Donzel, E.; Lewis, B.; Pellat, Ch. & Bosworth, C. E. (eds.). The Encyclopaedia of Islam, Second Edition. Volume IV: Iran–Kha. Leiden: E. J. Brill. pp. 660–665. doi:10.1163/1573-3912_islam_COM_0451. OCLC 758278456.
