= Ain Al Kuayba =

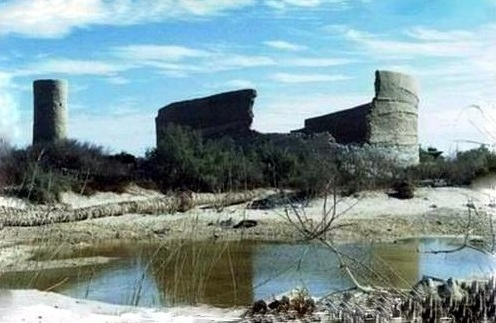
Ain Al Kaabya before being bulldozered

Ain Al Kuayba Arabic: عين الكعيبة is a freshwater spring located in Qatif, Saudi Arabia. It hosted the black stone in 930 (317H) after it had been looted from Kaaba by Abu Tahir al-Jannabi. In 2012 it was mistakenly bulldozed by a construction contractor, but reconstructed in 2015. Historians such as Ali Aldarorah believe that it dates back to the third millennium BC.
