= Abu'l-Fadl al-Isfahani =

Persian false Mahdi (died 931)

Abu'l-Fadl al-Isfahani, also known as the Isfahani Mahdi, was a young Persian man who in 931 CE was declared to be "God incarnate" by the Qarmatian leader of Bahrayn, Abu Tahir al-Jannabi. This new apocalyptic leader, however, caused great disruption by rejecting traditional aspects of Islam, and promoting ties to Zoroastrianism.

Abu Tahir thought that he had identified the Mahdi as a young Persian prisoner from Isfahan by the name of Abu'l-Fadl al-Isfahani, who claimed to be a descendant of the Sassanid Persian kings. Al-Isfahani had been brought back to Bahrayn from the Qarmatians' raid into Iraq in 928. In 931, Abu Tahir turned over the state to this Mahdi-Caliph, said in fact to be a Zoroastrian revivalist with anti-Arab sentiments. He reinstituted the veneration of fire and engaged in burning religious books during an eighty-day rule. Isfahani also is thought to have some links with established Zoroastrian orthodoxy as the high priest of the Zoroastrians. Esfandiar Adarbad was executed by the Abbasid Caliph after being accused of complicity with Abu Tahir. His reign culminated in the execution of members of Bahrayn's notable families, including members of Abu Tahir's family. Abu Tahir's mother conspired to get rid of Abu'l-Fadl; she faked her death and sent a messenger to call the Mahdi to resurrect her. When he refused, he was exposed as being a normal human, and Abu Tahir's brother Sa'id killed Abu'l-Fadl after the Mahdi had reigned for only eighty days. Other accounts say, that fearing for his own life, Abu Tahir announced that he had been wrong and denounced al-Isfahani as a false Mahdi. Begging forgiveness from the other notables, Abu Tahir had him executed. According to another account, al-Isfahani's attempt to institute Zoroastrian worship led Abu Tahir to have him murdered less than three months after proclaiming him the Mahdi.

== Sources ==
- Canard, Marius (1965). "al-D̲j̲annābī". In Lewis, B.; Pellat, Ch. & Schacht, J. (eds.). The Encyclopaedia of Islam, Second Edition. Volume II: C–G. Leiden: E. J. Brill. pp. 452–454. doi:10.1163/1573-3912_islam_SIM_1998. OCLC 495469475.
- Daftary, Farhad (2007). The Ismāʿı̄lı̄s: Their History and Doctrines (2nd ed.). Cambridge University Press. ISBN 978-0-521-61636-2.
- Halm, Heinz (1991). Das Reich des Mahdi: Der Aufstieg der Fatimiden [The Empire of the Mahdi: The Rise of the Fatimids] (in German). Munich: C. H. Beck. ISBN 978-3-406-35497-7.
- Madelung, Wilferd (1978). "Ḳarmaṭī". In van Donzel, E.; Lewis, B.; Pellat, Ch. & Bosworth, C. E. (eds.). The Encyclopaedia of Islam, Second Edition. Volume IV: Iran–Kha. Leiden: E. J. Brill. pp. 660–665. doi:10.1163/1573-3912_islam_COM_0451. ISBN 978-90-04-05745-6. OCLC 758278456.
- Madelung, Wilferd (1996). "The Fatimids and the Qarmatīs of Bahrayn". In Daftary, Farhad (ed.). Mediaeval Isma'ili History and Thought. Cambridge University Press. pp. 21–73. ISBN 978-0-521-00310-0.
