= Abu Hatim al-Zutti =

Abu Hatim al-Zutti (Arabic: أبو حاتم الزطي) was an Isma'ili preacher who was the founder of the Baqliyya sub-sect of Qarmatians.

== Biography ==
Abu Hatim al-Zutti was a Zutt, who were Jats living in the lower Iraq during the Caliphate period. He started propagating his faith in 907 in lower Iraq, prohibiting his followers from eating garlic, leeks, and turnips, slaughtering animals, and following certain customary Islamic religious observances. Due to these restrictions, they came to be known as "the Greengrocers" (al-Baqliyyah), and this label was soon used to generally refer to the Qarmatians of the Sawad.
