= Ibn Hubayra =

Ibn Hubayra (Arabic: ابن هبيرة) may refer to:

- Umar ibn Hubayra (fl. 710s–720s), Umayyad general and governor of Iraq
- Yazid ibn Umar ibn Hubayra (died 750), Umayyad general and governor of Iraq, son of the above
- Awn ad-Din ibn Hubayra (1105–1165), Arab scholar and vizier
