= Qasr Ibn Hubayra =

City of medieval Iraq

Qasr Ibn Hubayra (Arabic: قصر ابن هبيرة) was a city of medieval Iraq, north of Hillah and Babylon.

== History ==
The name Qasr Ibn Hubayrah means "the castle or palace of Ibn Hubayra", referring to the city's founder, Yazid ibn Umar ibn Hubayra. He had been governor of Iraq in the late 740s, under the Umayyad caliph Marwan II, but died before his palace was completed. It was located midway between Kufa in the south and Baghdad in the north, close to the Euphrates river and amidst the various channels that were used for carrying goods to the town's markets.

The later geographer Yaqut al-Hamawi reports that the first Abbasid caliph, al-Saffah, oversaw its completion, then took up residence there. Al-Saffah named it al-Hashimiya after his ancestor, Hashim, but the name never achieved widespread use. The city thus reportedly served as the capital of the nascent Abbasid Caliphate, before the construction of Baghdad. It is likely, however, that Yaqut confused his account with the report in al-Baladhuri that al-Saffah settled at Madinat Ibn Hubayra, another site, closer to Kufa, where Yazid also had begun construction, but had abandoned it at the orders of Marwan II.

In the 10th and 11th centuries, Qasr Ibn Hubayra was the largest town on the road between Baghdad and Kufa. It stood on a canal called the Nahr Abu Raha, or "the canal of the mill", which formed a loop off the side of the Nahr Sura. Al-Muqaddasi noted that the city had a large population, with good markets and a large Jewish population. The city's Friday mosque was in the marketplace.

By the early 1100s, however, Qasr Ibn Hubayra had been eclipsed by the rise of Hillah to the south, and at some point fell into ruin. Its precise location is unknown, although Guy Le Strange posited that it was "doubtless one of the numerous ruins which lie a few miles due north of the great mounds of ancient Babylon". McGuire Gibson located Qasr Ibn Hubayra somewhere in the vicinity of the present Hindiya Barrage.

== Sources ==
- Gibson, McGuire (1972). The City and Area of Kish. Miami: Field Research Projects. pp. 53–55, 155. Archived from the original on 2020-07-14.
- Lassner, J. (1978). "Ḳaṣr ibn Hubayra". In van Donzel, E.; Lewis, B.; Pellat, Ch. & Bosworth, C. E. (eds.). The Encyclopaedia of Islam, Second Edition. Volume IV: Iran–Kha. Leiden: E. J. Brill. pp. 728–729. doi:10.1163/1573-3912_islam_SIM_3997. ISBN 978-90-04-05745-6. OCLC 758278456.
- Le Strange, Guy (1905). The Lands of the Eastern Caliphate: Mesopotamia, Persia, and Central Asia, from the Moslem Conquest to the Time of Timur. Cambridge: Cambridge University Press.
