= Black Stone =

Islamic relic at the Kaaba in Mecca

Coordinates: 21°25′21.0″N 39°49′34.2″E

Black Stone (Hajar al-Aswad)
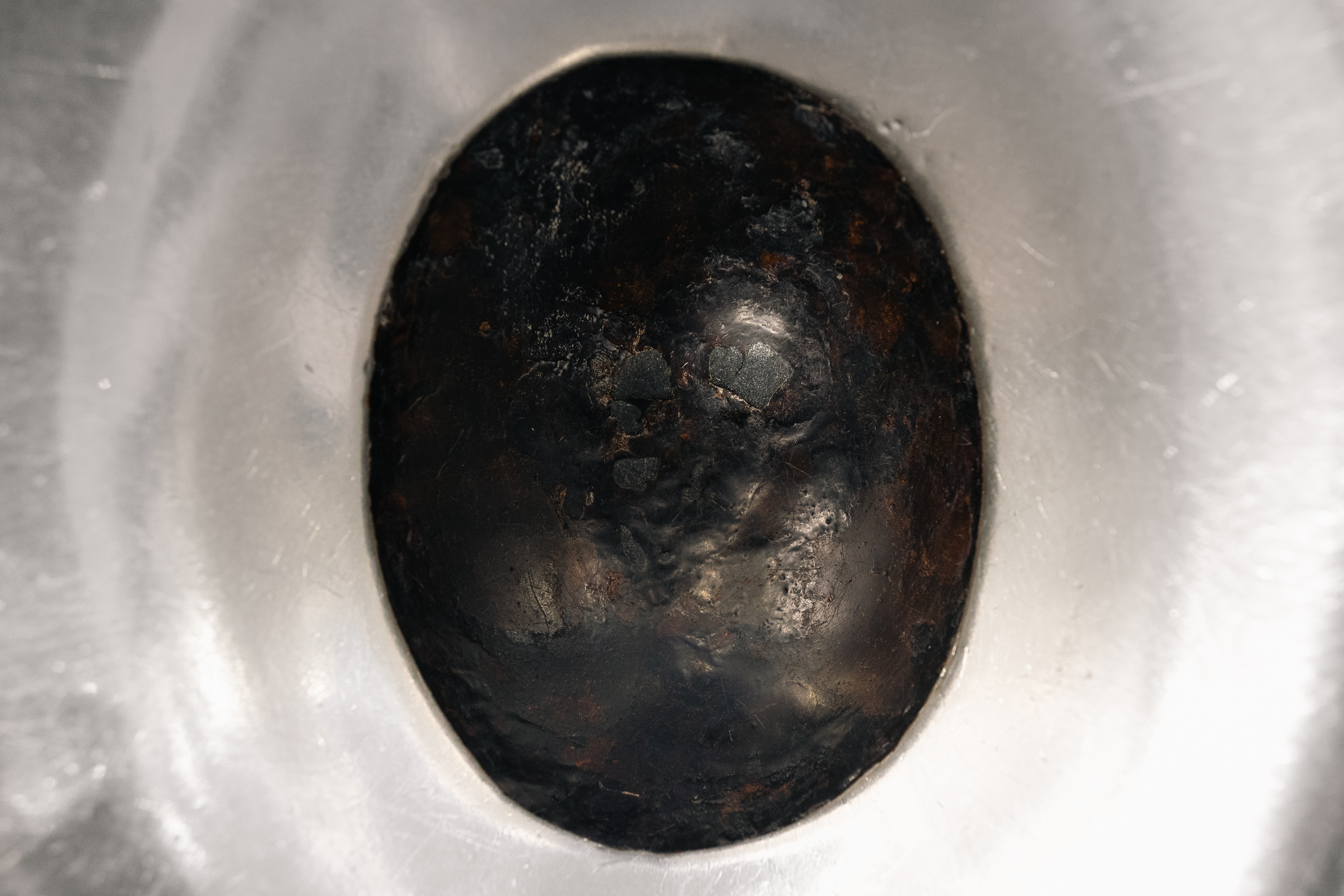
- The Black Stone embedded in the eastern corner of the Kaaba
- Interactive map of Black Stone (Hajar al-Aswad)
- Type: Sacred stone / Islamic relic
- Periods: Pre-Islamic Arabia to present
- Cultures: Islamic
- Satellite of: Masjid al-Haram
- Associated with: Pilgrims during Hajj and Umrah rituals
- Location: Masjid al-Haram, Mecca, Saudi Arabia
- Region: Hejaz
- Part of: Kaaba

History
- Built: Antiquity (pre-Islamic period; according to Islamic tradition from heaven)
- Built by: Prophet Ibrahim and Prophet Ismail.
- Event: Ritual touching or kissing during Tawaf

Site notes
- Material: Stone fragments held together with cement and surrounded by a silver frame
- Height: 112 cm (44 in)
- Length: 20 cm (7.9 in)
- Width: 16 cm (6.3 in)
- Condition: Preserved; fragments set in silver frame
- Management: General Presidency for the Affairs of the Two Holy Mosques
- Public access: Yes (restricted during pilgrimage flow)
- Website: https://www.gph.gov.sa
- Originally a single stone; now consists of several fragments fixed with cement and encased in a silver frame.

The Black Stone (Arabic: الحجر الأسود, romanized: al-Ḥajar al-Aswad) is a rock set into the eastern corner of the Kaaba, the ancient building in the center of the Masjid al-Haram in Mecca, Saudi Arabia. It is revered by most Muslims as an Islamic relic which, according to tradition, dates back to the time of Adam and Eve.

The stone was venerated at the Kaaba in pre-Islamic Arabia. It is sometimes considered a baetyl. According to tradition, it was set intact into the Kaaba's wall by Muhammad in 605, five years before his first revelation. Since then, it has been broken into fragments and is now encased in a silver frame on the side of the Kaaba. Its physical appearance is that of a fragmented, dark rock, polished smooth by the hands of pilgrims. It has often been described as a meteorite, but it has never been analysed with modern techniques, so its scientific origins remain the subject of speculation.

Muslim pilgrims circle the Kaaba as a part of the tawaf ritual during the Hajj and many try to stop to kiss the Black Stone, emulating the kiss that Islamic tradition records that it received from Muhammad. While the Black Stone is revered, theologians emphasize that it has no divine significance and that its importance is historical in nature.

== History and tradition ==
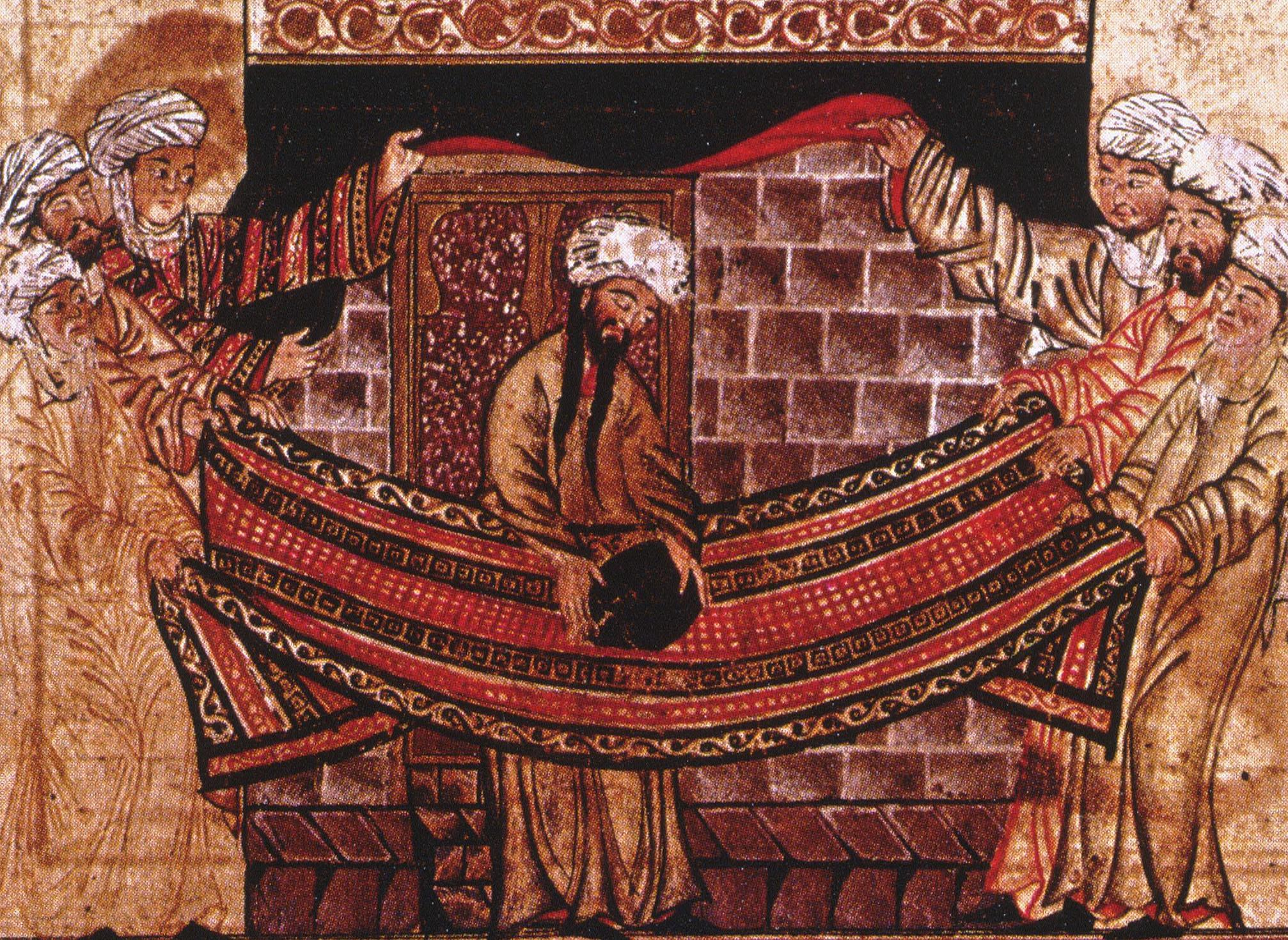
A 1315 illustration from the Jami' al-tawarikh inspired by the sīrah story of Muhammad and the Meccan clan elders lifting the Black Stone into place.

The Black Stone was held in reverence long before the advent of Islam. It had long been associated with the Kaaba, which was built in the pre-Islamic period and was a site of pilgrimage for the Nabataeans of northern Arabia and the southern Levant, who visited the shrine once a year to perform their pilgrimage. Idolatry is forbidden in the Hebrew Bible and the Quran. However, the use of aniconic stones, called baetyls, is known from the eastern Mediterranean; "baetyl" originates in the Bethel narrative of Jacob's Ladder. The Kaaba allegedly held 360 idols of the Meccan gods. The meteoritic origin theory of the Black Stone has seen it likened by some writers to the meteorite which was placed and worshipped in the Temple of Artemis.

A "red stone" was associated with the deity of the South Arabian city of Ghaiman, and there was a "white stone" in the Kaaba of al-Abalat (near Tabala, south of Mecca). Worship at that time period was often associated with stone reverence, mountains, special rock formations, or distinctive trees. The Kaaba marked the location where the sacred world intersected with the profane, and the embedded Black Stone was a further symbol of this as an object as a link between heaven and earth. Aziz Al-Azmeh claims that the divine name ar-Rahman (one of the names of God in Islam and cognate to one of the Jewish names of God Ha'Rachaman, both meaning "the Merciful One" or "the Gracious One") was used for astral gods in Mecca and might have been associated with the Black Stone. Muhammad is said to have called the stone "the right hand of al-Rahman".

=== Muhammad ===
According to Islamic belief, Muhammad is credited with setting the Black Stone in its current place in the wall of the Kaaba. A story found in ibn Ishaq's Al-Sirah al-Nabawiyyah tells how the clans of Mecca renovated the Kaaba following a major fire which had partly destroyed the structure. The Black Stone had been temporarily removed to facilitate the rebuilding work. The clans could not agree on which one of them should have the honour of setting the Black Stone back in its place.

They decided to wait for the next man to come through the gate and ask him to make the decision. That person was 35-year-old Muhammad, five years before his prophethood. He asked the elders of the clans to bring him a cloth and place the Black Stone at its center. Each of the clan leaders held the corners of the cloth and carried the Black Stone to the right spot. Then, Muhammad set the stone in place, satisfying the honour of all of the clans. After his Conquest of Mecca in 630, Muhammad is said to have ridden round the Kaaba seven times on his camel, touching the Black Stone with his stick in a gesture of reverence.

=== Desecrations ===
The Stone has suffered repeated desecrations and damage over time. It is said to have been struck and smashed to pieces by a stone fired from a catapult during the Umayyad Caliphate's siege of Mecca in 683. The fragments were rejoined by Abd Allah ibn al-Zubayr using a silver ligament. In January 930, it was stolen by the Qarmatians, who carried the Black Stone away to their base in Hajar (modern Eastern Arabia). According to Ottoman historian Qutb al-Din, writing in 1857, the Qarmatian leader Abu Tahir al-Jannabi set the Black Stone up in his own mosque, the Masjid al-Dirar "Mosque of Dissent", with the intention of redirecting the Hajj away from Mecca. This attempt failed, as pilgrims continued to venerate the spot where the Black Stone had been located.

According to the historian al-Juwayni, the Stone was returned twenty-three years later, in 952. The Qarmatians held the Black Stone for ransom and attempted to force the Abbasids to pay a huge sum for its return. It was wrapped in a sack and thrown into the Great Mosque of Kufa, accompanied by a note saying "By command we took it, and by command we have brought it back." Its abduction and removal caused further damage, breaking the stone into seven pieces. Its abductor, Abu Tahir, is said to have met a terrible fate; according to Qutb al-Din, "the filthy Abu Tahir was afflicted with a gangrenous sore, his flesh was eaten away by worms, and he died a most terrible death." To protect the shattered stone, the custodians of the Kaaba commissioned a pair of Meccan goldsmiths to build a silver frame to surround it, and it has been enclosed in a similar frame ever since.

In the 11th century, a man allegedly sent by the Fatimid caliph al-Hakim bi-Amr Allah attempted to smash the Black Stone but was killed on the spot, having caused only slight damage. In 1674, according to Johann Ludwig Burckhardt, someone allegedly smeared the Black Stone with excrement so that "every one who kissed it retired with a sullied beard". According to the archaic Sunni belief, by the accusation of one boy, the Persian of an unknown faith was suspected of sacrilege, where Sunnis of Mecca "have turned the circumstance to their own advantage" by assaulting, beating random Persians and forbidding them from Hajj until the ban was overturned by the order of Muhammad Ali. The explorer Richard Francis Burton pointed out on the alleged "excrement action" that "it is scarcely necessary to say that a Shi'a, as well as a Sunni, would look upon such an action with lively horror", and that the real culprit was "some Jew or Christian, who risked his life to gratify a furious bigotry".

== Physical description ==
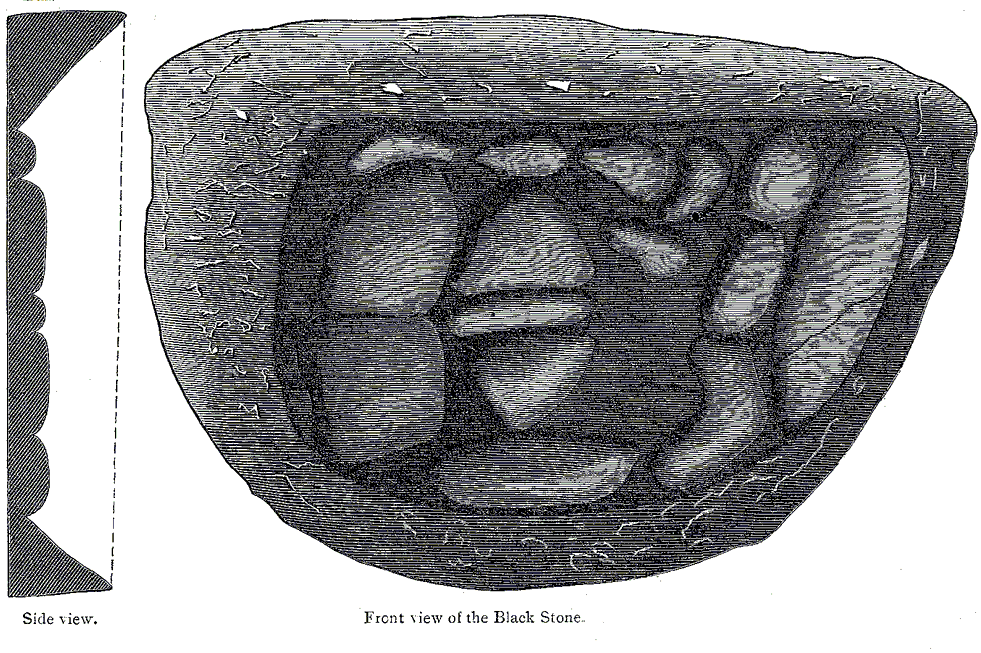
The fragmented Black Stone as it appeared in the 1850s, front and side illustrations

The Black Stone was originally a single piece of rock but today consists of several pieces that have been cemented together. They are surrounded by a silver frame which is fastened by silver nails to the Kaaba's outer wall. The fragments are, in turn, made up of smaller pieces that have been combined to form the seven or eight fragments visible today. The Stone's exposed face measures about 20 centimetres (7.9 in) by 16 centimetres (6.3 in). Its original size is unclear and the recorded dimensions have changed considerably over time, as the pieces have been rearranged in their cement matrix on several occasions. In the 10th century, an observer described the Black Stone as being one cubit (46 cm or 18 in) long. By the early 17th century, it was recorded as measuring 140 by 122 cm (4 ft 7 in by 4 ft 0 in). According to Ali Bey in the 18th century, it was described as 110 cm (3 ft 7 in) high, and Muhammad Ali Pasha reported it as being 76 cm (2 ft 6 in) long by 46 cm (1 ft 6 in) wide.

The Black Stone is attached to the east corner of the Kaaba, known as al-Rukn al-Aswad (the 'Corner of the Black [Stone]'). The choice of the east corner may have had ritual significance; it faces the rain-bringing east wind (al-qabul) and the direction from which Canopus rises.

The silver frame around the Black Stone and the black kiswah or cloth enveloping the Kaaba were for centuries maintained by the Ottoman Sultans in their role as Custodian of the Two Holy Mosques. The frames wore out over time due to the constant handling by pilgrims and were periodically replaced. Worn-out frames were brought back to Istanbul, where they are still kept as part of the sacred relics in the Topkapı Palace.

=== Appearance of the Black Stone ===
The Black Stone was described by European travellers to Arabia in the 19th- and early-20th centuries, who visited the Kaaba disguised as pilgrims. Swiss traveller Johann Ludwig Burckhardt visited Mecca in 1814, and provided a detailed description in his 1829 book Travels in Arabia:

It is an irregular oval, about seven inches [18 cm] in diameter, with an undulated surface, composed of about a dozen smaller stones of different sizes and shapes, well joined together with a small quantity of cement, and perfectly well smoothed; it looks as if the whole had been broken into as many pieces by a violent blow, and then united again. It is very difficult to determine accurately the quality of this stone which has been worn to its present surface by the millions of touches and kisses it has received. It appeared to me like a lava, containing several small extraneous particles of a whitish and of a yellow substance. Its colour is now a deep reddish brown approaching to black. It is surrounded on all sides by a border composed of a substance which I took to be a close cement of pitch and gravel of a similar, but not quite the same, brownish colour. This border serves to support its detached pieces; it is two or three inches in breadth, and rises a little above the surface of the stone. Both the border and the stone itself are encircled by a silver band, broader below than above, and on the two sides, with a considerable swelling below, as if a part of the stone were hidden under it. The lower part of the border is studded with silver nails.

Visiting the Kaaba in 1853, Richard Francis Burton noted that:

The colour appeared to me black and metallic, and the centre of the stone was sunk about two inches below the metallic circle. Round the sides was a reddish-brown cement, almost level with the metal, and sloping down to the middle of the stone. The band is now a massive arch of gold or silver gilt. I found the aperture in which the stone is, one span and three fingers broad.

Ritter von Laurin, the Austrian consul-general in Egypt, was able to inspect a fragment of the Stone removed by the Ottoman ruler Muhammad Ali in 1817 and reported that it had a pitch-black exterior and a silver-grey, fine-grained interior in which tiny cubes of a bottle-green material were embedded. There are reportedly a few white or yellow spots on the face of the Stone, and it is officially described as being white with the exception of the face.

== Ritual role ==
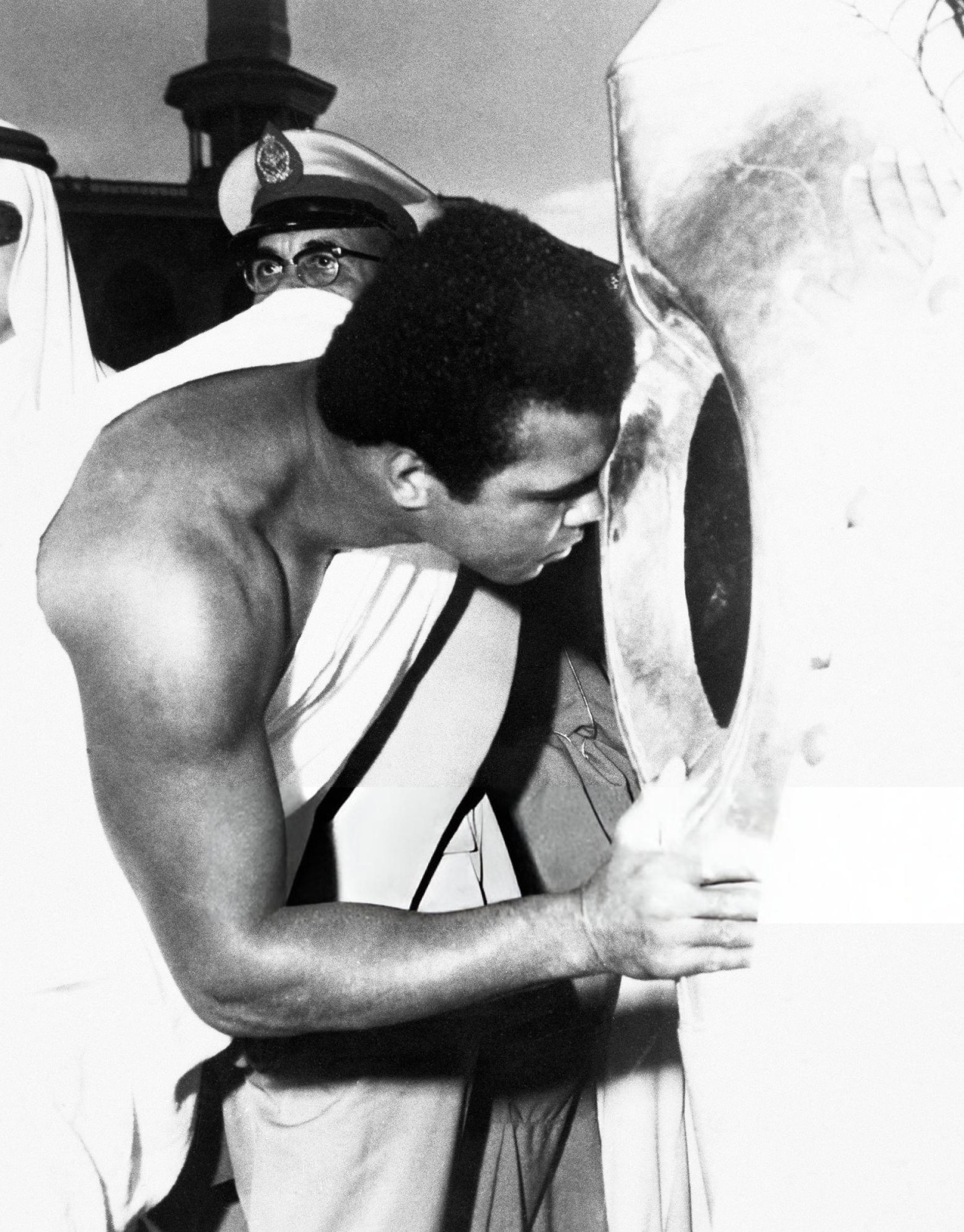
Muhammad Ali kissing the Black Stone in 1972

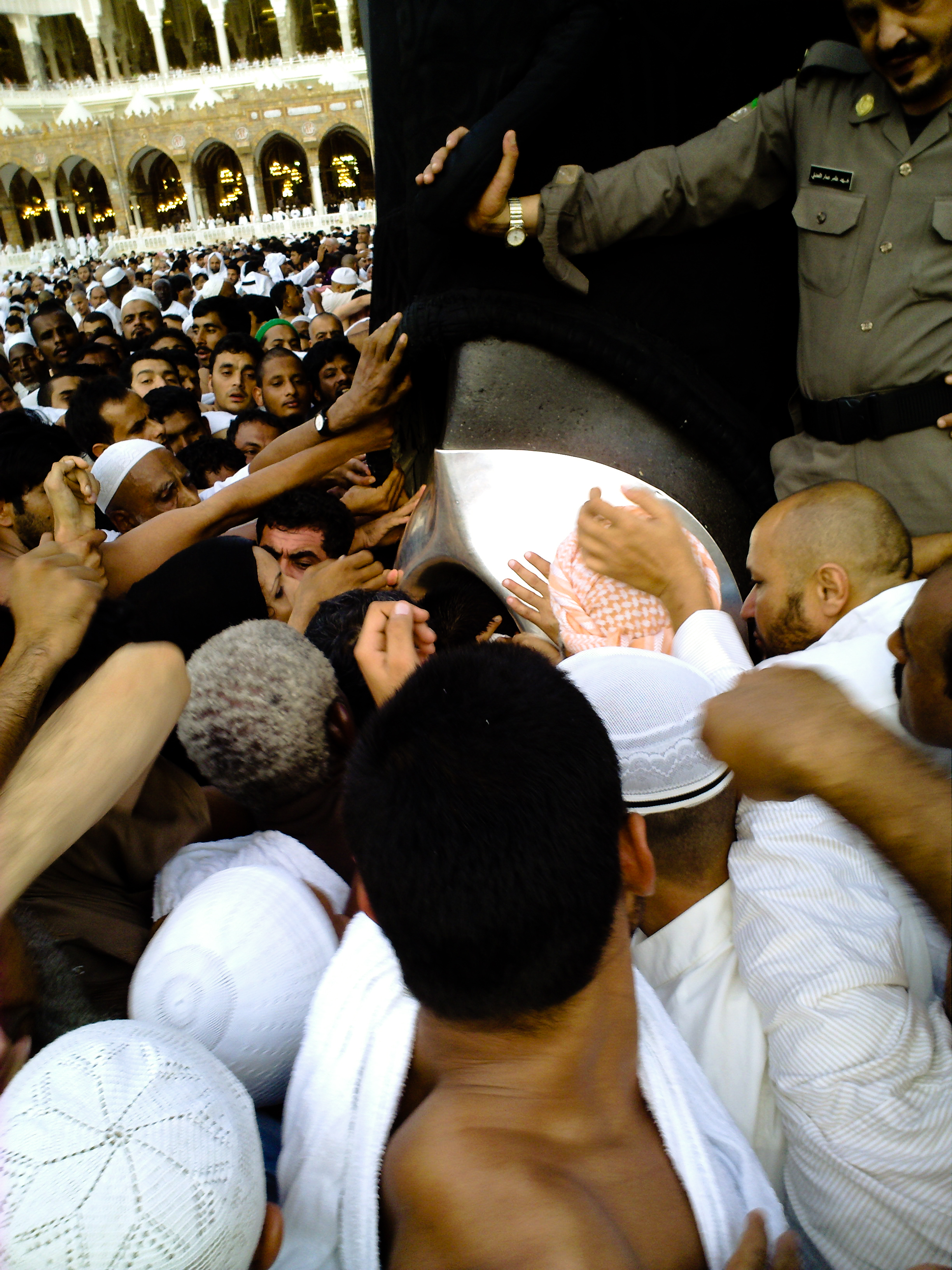
Pilgrims jostle for a chance to kiss the Black Stone; if they are unable to kiss it, they can point towards it on each circuit with their right hand

The Black Stone plays a central role in the ritual of istilam, when pilgrims kiss the Black Stone, touch it with their hands or raise their hands towards it while repeating the takbir "God is Greatest". They perform this in the course of walking seven times around the Kaaba in a counterclockwise direction (tawaf), emulating the actions of Muhammad. At the end of each circuit, they perform istilam and may approach the Black Stone to kiss it at the end of tawaf. In modern times, large crowds make it practically impossible for everyone to kiss the stone, so it is currently acceptable to point in the direction of the Stone on each of their seven circuits around the Kaaba. Some even say that the Stone is best considered simply as a marker, useful in keeping count of the ritual circumambulations that one has performed.

Writing in Dawn in Madinah: A Pilgrim's Passage, Muzaffar Iqbal described his experience of venerating the Black Stone during a pilgrimage to Mecca:

At the end of the second [circumambulation of the Kaaba], I was granted one of those extraordinary moments which sometimes occur around the Black Stone. As I approached the Corner the large crowd was suddenly pushed back by a strong man who had just kissed the Black Stone. This push generated a backward current, creating a momentary opening around the Black Stone as I came to it; I swiftly accepted the opportunity reciting, Bismillahi Allahu akbar wa lillahi-hamd ["In the name of God, God is great, all praise to God"], put my hands on the Black Stone and kissed it. Thousands of silver lines sparkled, the Stone glistened, and something stirred deep inside me. A few seconds passed. Then I was pushed away by the guard.

The Black Stone and the Kaaba's opposite corner, al-Rukn al-Yamani, are both often perfumed by the mosque's custodians. This can cause problems for pilgrims in the state of ihram ('consecration'), who are forbidden from using scented products and will require a kaffara (donation) as a penance if they touch either.

== Meaning and symbolism ==
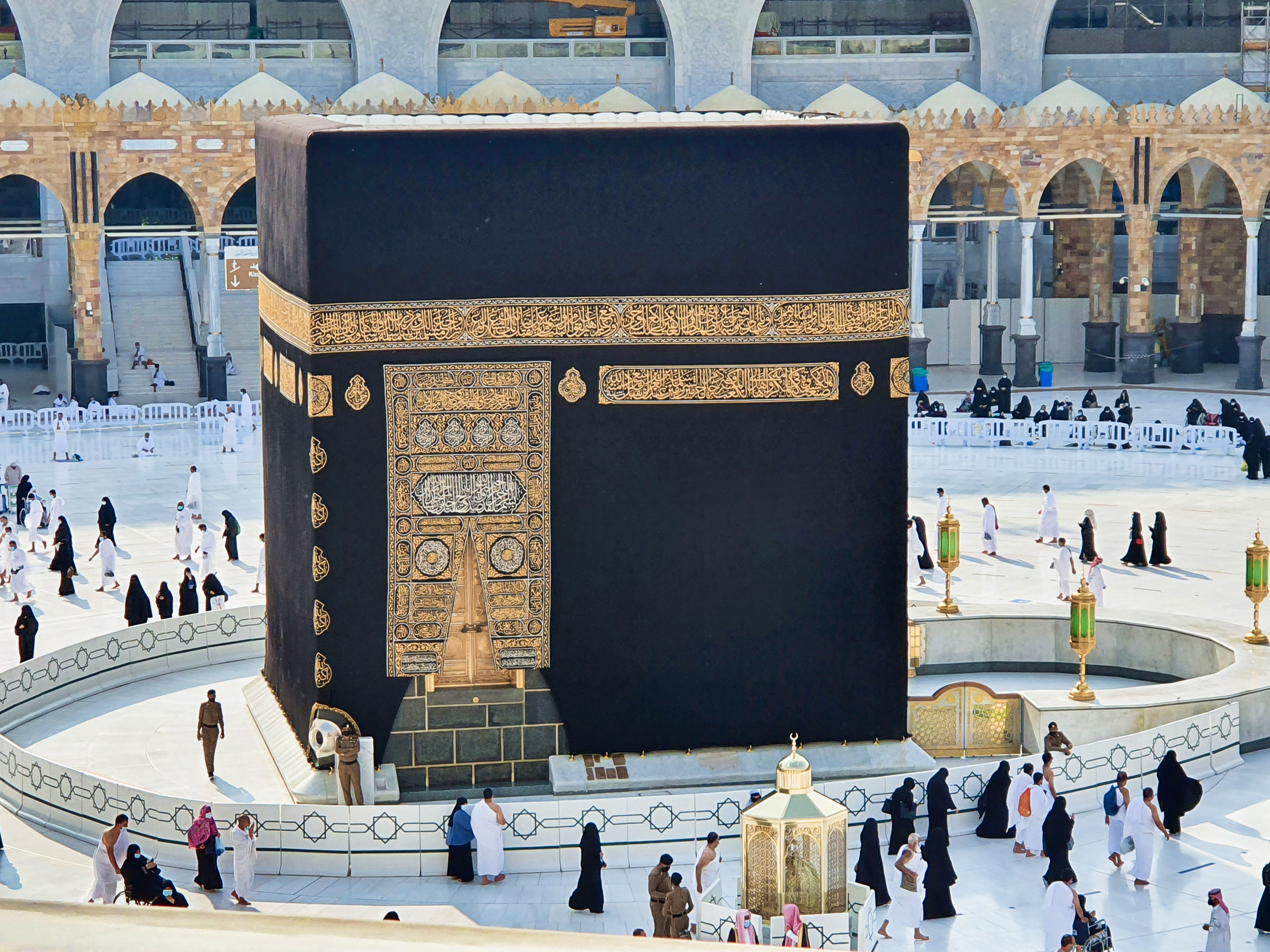
The Kaaba in Mecca. The Black Stone is set into the eastern corner of the building (bottom left).

One tradition holds that the Black Stone was placed by Adam in the original Kaaba. Muslims believe that the stone was originally pure and dazzling white, but has since turned black because of the sins of the people who touch it.

According to a prophetic tradition, "Touching them both (the Black Stone and al-Rukn al-Yamani) is an expiation for sins." Adam's altar and the stone were said to have been lost during the Great Flood and forgotten. Abraham was said to have later found the Black Stone at the original site of Adam's altar when the angel Gabriel revealed it to him. Abraham ordered his son Ishmael, who in Muslim belief is an ancestor of Muhammad, to build a new temple, the Kaaba, into which the stone was to be embedded.

Another tradition says that the Black Stone was originally an angel that had been placed by God in the Garden of Eden to guard Adam. The angel was absent when Adam ate the forbidden fruit and was punished by being turned into the Black Stone. God granted it the power of speech and placed it at the top of Abu Qubays, a mountain in the historic region of Khorasan, before moving the mountain to Mecca. When Abraham took the Black Stone from Abu Qubays to build the Kaaba, the mountain asked him to intercede with God so that it would not be returned to Khorasan but would stay in Mecca.

Another tradition holds that it was brought down to Earth by "an angel from heaven".

According to some scholars, the Black Stone was the same stone that Islamic tradition describes as greeting Muhammad before his prophethood. This led to a debate about whether the Black Stone's greeting comprised actual speech or merely a sound, and following that, whether the stone was a living creature or an inanimate object. Regardless of the case, the stone was regarded as a symbol of prophethood.

A hadith records that, when the second Rashid caliph, Umar (580–644), came to kiss the stone, he said in front of all assembled: "No doubt, I know that you are a stone and can neither harm anyone nor benefit anyone. Had I not seen Allah's Messenger [Muhammad] kissing you, I would not have kissed you." In the hadith collection Kanz al-Ummal, it is recorded that Ali responded to Umar, saying, "This stone (Hajar Aswad) can indeed benefit and harm. [...] Allah says in Quran that he created human beings from the progeny of Adam and made them witness over themselves and asked them, 'Am I not your creator?' Upon this, all of them confirmed it. Thus Allah wrote this confirmation. And this stone has a pair of eyes, ears and a tongue and it opened its mouth upon the order of Allah, who put that confirmation in it and ordered to witness it to all those worshippers who come for Hajj."

Muhammad Labib al-Batanuni, writing in 1911, commented on the practice that the pre-Islamic practice of venerating stones (including the Black Stone) arose not because such stones are "sacred for their own sake, but because of their relation to something holy and respected". The Indian Islamic scholar Muhammad Hamidullah summed up the meaning of the Black Stone:

[T]he Prophet has named the (Black Stone) the "right hand of God" (yamin-Allah), and for purpose. In fact one poses there one's hand to conclude the pact, and God obtains there our pact of allegiance and submission. In the quranic terminology, God is the king, and [...] in (his) realm there is a metropolis (Umm al-Qurra) and in the metropolis naturally a palace (Bait-Allah, home of God). If a subject wants to testify to his loyalty, he has to go to the royal palace and conclude personally the pact of allegiance. The right hand of the invisible God must be visible symbolically. And that is the al-Hajar al-Aswad, the Black Stone in the Ka'bah.

In recent years, several literalist views of the Black Stone have emerged. A small minority accepts as literally true a hadith, usually taken as allegorical, which asserts that "the Stone will appear on the Day of Judgement (Qiyamah) with eyes to see and a tongue to speak, and give evidence in favour of all who kissed it in true devotion, but speak out against whoever indulged in gossip or profane conversations during his circumambulation of the Kaaba".

== Scientific origins ==
The Black Stone has never been analysed with modern scientific techniques. Its nature and origin has been much debated but it remains the subject of scientific speculation. It has been described variously as basalt stone, a piece of natural glass or—most popularly—a stony meteorite or meteorite impact trace material known as impactite. Paul Partsch, the curator of the Austro-Hungarian imperial collection of minerals, published the first comprehensive analysis of the Black Stone in 1857, in which he favoured a meteoritic origin for the stone.

A significant clue to its nature is provided by an account of the stone's recovery in 951 CE, after it had been stolen 21 years earlier. According to a chronicler, the stone was identified by its ability to float in water, which would rule out the Black Stone being an agate, a basalt, or a stony meteorite, though it would be compatible with it being glass or pumice.

Elsebeth Thomsen of the University of Copenhagen proposed a different hypothesis in 1980. She suggested that the Black Stone may be a glass fragment, or impactive, from the impact of a fragmented meteorite that fell 6,000 years ago at Wabar, a site in the Rub' al Khali desert 1,100 kilometres (680 mi) east of Mecca. A 2004 scientific analysis of the Wabar site suggests that the impact event occurred much more recently than previously thought and may have happened within the last 200–300 years. Given that the vast majority of impact craters on have been buried by weather and other processes of sedimentation, the thermographic finding at Wabar does not rule out the notion that the Black Stone may be a relic of an ancient meteorite impact. Nevertheless, the meteoritic hypothesis is viewed by geologists as doubtful. The Natural History Museum, London suggests that it may be a pseudometeorite; in other words, a terrestrial rock mistakenly attributed to a meteoritic origin.

== See also ==
- Qibla, direction in which Muslims pray
- List of individual rocks
