= Bandar Ganaveh =

City in Bushehr province, Iran

Bandar-e Ganaveh Persian: بندرگناوه
- City
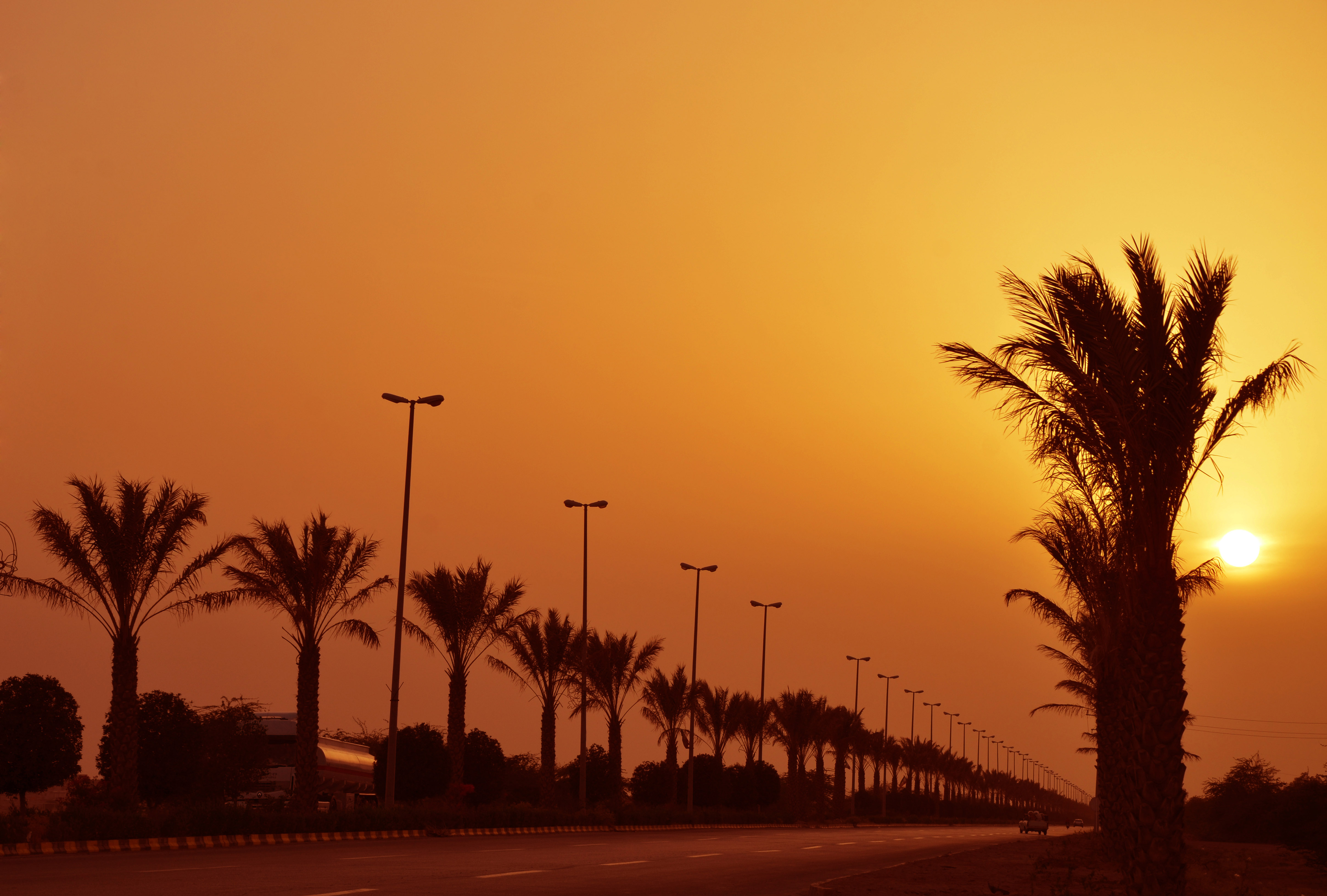
- Bandar-e Ganaveh Boulevard

- Location within Iran
- Coordinates: 29°34′51″N 50°31′02″E
- Country: Iran
- Province: Bushehr
- County: Ganaveh
- District: Central

Population (2016)
  - Total: 73,472
- Time zone: UTC+3:30 (IRST)

Bandar Ganaveh (Persian: بندرگناوه) (Note: Also romanized as Bandar Genaveh, Bandar-e Ganāveh, Bandar-e Genāveh, and Bandar-e-Gonāveh; also known as Ganāveh, Genāveh, Gonāveh, and Kenâreh) is a city in the Central District of Ganaveh County, Bushehr province, Iran, serving as capital of both the county and the district.

== History ==
Bandar Ganaveh is the place where the Persian warlord, and founder of the Qarmatian State Abu Sa'id al-Jannabi originated from. Ganaveh was historically famous for its pearl fishing and tiraz production, but it seems to have already been in decline by the 10th century. The reason may have been because of the Qarmatian wars, or perhaps because of the lack of water supplies. It had been the port of Bishapur and then Kazerun.

== Demographics ==
=== Language and ethnicity ===
The people of Bandar Ganaveh are Lurs who speak the Southern Luri dialect. Located on the Persian Gulf coast, they share cultural and linguistic ties with the Lurs of Kohgiluyeh, Boyer-Ahmad, and Bakhtiari. Their dialect, distinct from Persian, is a key branch of Southwestern Iranian languages. Despite modern influences, Ganaveh’s Luri identity remains strong.

=== Population ===
At the time of the 2006 National Census, the city's population was 59,291 in 12,548 households. The following census in 2011 counted 64,110 people in 15,752 households. The 2016 census measured the population of the city as 73,472 people in 19,977 households.

== See also ==
- Arrajan

Media related to Bandar Ganaveh at Wikimedia Commons
