= Qarmatians =

Sevener Ismaili Shia group

Qarmatians قرامطة
- 899–1077
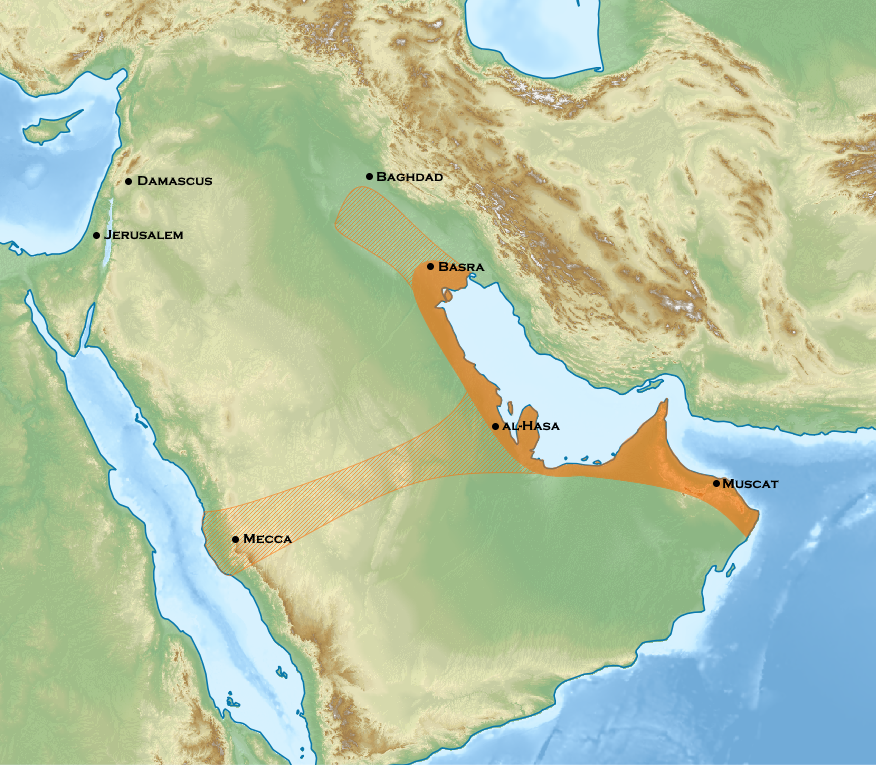
- Qarmatians under Abu Tahir al-Jannabi in 930
- Capital: Al-Ahsa
- Common languages: Arabic, Persian
- Religion: Isma'ili Shia Islam
- Government: Theocracy
- Ruler
  - 899–914: Abu Sa'id al-Jannabi
  - 914–944: Abu Tahir al-Jannabi
  - 944–970: Ahmad Abu Tahir
  - 968–977: Al-Hasan al-A'sam
  - 970–972: Abul Kassim Sa'id
  - 972–977: Abu Yaqub Yousuf
- Historical era: Islamic Golden Age
  - Ismāʿīlī schism: 765
  - Established: 899
  - Sack of Mecca: 930
  - al-Isfahani proclaimed to be the Mahdi: 931
  - Black Stone returned: 952
  - Defeated by the Abbasids: 976
  - Overthrow: 1077
| Preceded by | Succeeded by |
| Abbasid Caliphate | Uyunid Emirate; Ayyashid Emirate |

Qarmatians
- قرامطة
- Founder: Abu Sa'id al-Jannabi
- Dates active: 899–1077
- Active regions: Bahrayn, Mesopotamia, Najd, Hejaz, Levant, Egypt
- Ideology: Isma'ilism; Extremism; Socialism; Islamic socialism Utopian socialism

The Qarmatians (Note: Arabic: قرامطة, romanized: Qarāmiṭa; Persian: قرمطیان, romanized: Qarmatiyān; also transliterated as Carmathians, Qarmathians, Karmathians, Karmatian, or Kalmati, Karmathian, Qarmatī, or Qarāmiṭah.) were an Isma'ili Shia militant movement led by an Arabized dynasty of Persian descent. Claiming an Alid descent, the Qarmatians were centred in al-Ahsa in Eastern Arabia, where they established a religious state in 899 CE. The Qarmatians adhered to a syncretic branch of Sevener Ismaili Shia Islam, and were ruled by a dynasty founded by Abu Sa'id al-Jannabi. They rejected the claim of the Fatimid caliph Abdallah al-Mahdi Billah to the imamate and, clinging to their belief in the coming of the Mahdi, revolted against both the Fatimid and Abbasid caliphates.

The Qarmatians are perhaps most notable for sacking Mecca in 930 CE under the leadership of Abu Tahir al-Jannabi. This violent act outraged the contemporary Muslim world, particularly because of their theft of the Black Stone and the desecration of the Zamzam Well with the corpses of pilgrims during the Hajj season.

== Name and origin ==
The origin of the name "Qarmatian" is uncertain. According to some sources, the name derives from the surname of the sect's founder, Hamdan Qarmat. The name qarmat probably comes from the Aramaic for "short-legged", "red-eyed" or "secret teacher". Other sources, however, say that the name comes from the Arabic verb قرمط (qarmaṭ), which means "to make the lines close together in writing" or "to walk with short steps". The word "Qarmatian" can also refer to a type of Arabic script.

The Qarmatians in Sawad (southern Iraq) were also known as "the Greengrocers" (al-Baqliyyah) because they followed the teachings of Abu Hatim al-Zutti, who in 908 forbade animal slaughter. He also forbade radishes and alliums such as garlic, onions, and leeks. By 928, it is uncertain whether the people still held on to those teachings.

The founder of the dynasty, Abu Sa'id al-Jannabi, was of Persian origin, from Jannabah in coastal Fars. The Qarmatians were culturally Arabized and claimed Alid descent.

== History ==
=== Early developments ===
Under the Abbasid Caliphate (750–1258 CE), various Shiite groups organised in secret opposition to their rule. Among them were the supporters of the proto-Isma'ili community, of whom the most prominent group were called the Mubarakiyyah.

According to the Ismaili school of thought, Imām Ja'far al-Sadiq (702–765) designated his second son, Isma'il ibn Ja'far (c. 721–755), as heir to the Imamate. However, Ismā‘īl predeceased his father. Some claimed he had gone into hiding, but the proto-Isma'ili group accepted his death and therefore accordingly recognized Isma'il's eldest son, Muhammad ibn Isma'il (746–809), as Imam. He remained in contact with the Mubarakiyyah group, most of whom resided in Kufa.

The split among the Mubarakiyyah came with the death of Muhammad ibn Isma'il (c. 813 CE). The majority of the group denied his death; they recognized him as the Mahdi. The minority believed in his death and would eventually emerge in later times as the Isma'ili Fatimid Caliphate, the precursors to all modern groups.

The majority Isma'ili missionary movement settled in Salamiyah (now in Syria) and had great success in Khuzestan (southwestern Iran), where the Isma'ili leader al-Husayn al-Ahwazi converted the Kufan man Hamdan in 874 CE, who took the name Qarmat after his new faith. Qarmat and his theologian brother-in-law Abdan prepared southern Iraq for the coming of the Mahdi by creating a military and religious stronghold. Other such locations grew up in Yemen, in Eastern Arabia (Arabic Bahrayn) in 899, and in North Africa. They attracted many new Shi'i followers because of their activist and messianic teachings. The new proto-Qarmati movement continued to spread into Greater Iran and then into Transoxiana.

=== Qarmatian Revolution ===
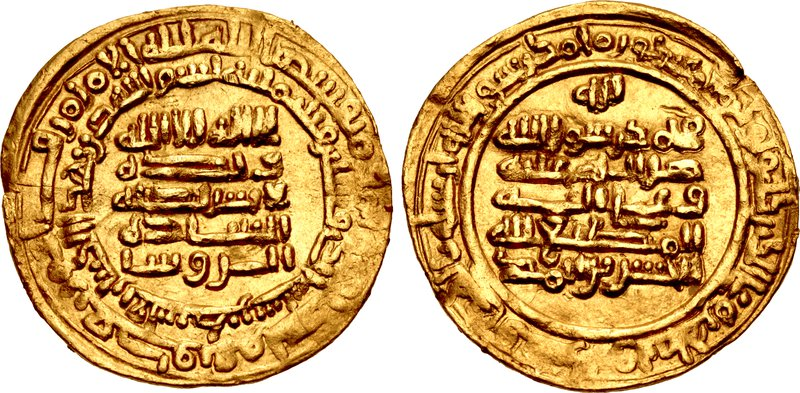
Gold dinar minted by the Qarmatians during their occupation of Palestine in the 970s

A change in leadership in Salamiyah in 899 led to a split in the movement. The minority Isma'ilis, whose leader had taken control of the Salamiyah centre, began to proclaim their teachings that Imam Muhammad had died and that the new leader in Salamiyah (Abdallah al-Mahdi Billah) was in fact his descendant come out of hiding and was the Mahdi (a Messianic figure who will appear on Earth before the Day of Judgment and rid the world of wrongdoing, injustice and tyranny). Qarmat and his brother-in-law opposed this and openly broke with the Salamiyids; when Abdan was assassinated, he went into hiding and subsequently repented. Qarmaṭ became a missionary of the new imam, Abdallah al-Mahdi Billah (873–934), who founded the Fatimid Caliphate in North Africa in 909.

Nonetheless, the dissident group retained the name Qarmati. Its greatest stronghold remained in Bahrain, which then included much of eastern Arabia as well as the islands that comprise the present state. It was under Abbasid control at the end of the ninth century, but the Zanj Rebellion in Basra disrupted the power of Baghdad. The Qarmatians seized their opportunity under their leader, Abu Sa'id al-Jannabi, an Arabized Persian who hailed from Jannaba in coastal Fars. Eventually, from Qatar, he captured Bahrain's capital Hajr and al-Hasa in 899, which he made the capital of his state and once in control of the state he sought to set up a utopian society.

The Qarmatians instigated what one scholar termed a "century of terror" in Kufa. They considered the pilgrimage to Mecca to be bid'ah (illicit innovation), and once in control of the Bahrayni state, they launched raids along the pilgrim routes crossing the Arabian Peninsula. In 906, they ambushed the pilgrim caravan returning from Mecca and massacred 20,000 pilgrims.

Under al-Jannabi (ruled 923–944), the Qarmatians came close to capturing Baghdad in 927, and sacked Mecca in 930. They also sacked Medina shortly afterward. In their attack on Islam's holiest sites, the Qarmatians desecrated the Zamzam Well with corpses of Hajj pilgrims and took the Black Stone from Mecca to Ain al-Kuayba in Qatif. They held the Black Stone for ransom, and the Abbasids paid a huge sum for its return in 952. They also besieged Damascus and devastated many of the cities to the north. They took opportunity to sack Salamiyah, as well as Tiberias, before the Abbasid authorities were able to regain control.

The revolution and desecration shocked the Muslim world and humiliated the Abbasids, but little could be done. For much of the tenth century the Qarmatians were the most powerful force in the Persian Gulf and Middle East and controlled the coast of Oman and collecting tribute from the caliph in Baghdad as well as from a rival Isma'ili imam in Cairo, the head of the Fatimid Caliphate, whose power they did not recognize.

=== Qarmatian society ===
The land over which they ruled was extremely wealthy with a huge slave-based economy, as explained by academic Yitzhak Nakash:

The Qarmatian state had vast fruit and grain estates both on the islands and in Hasa and Qatif. Nasir Khusraw, who visited Hasa in 1051, recounted that these estates were cultivated by some thirty thousand Ethiopian slaves. He mentions that the people of Hasa were exempt from taxes. Those impoverished or in debt could obtain a loan until they put their affairs in order. No interest was taken on loans, and token lead money was used for all local transactions. The Qarmathian state had a powerful and long-lasting legacy. This is evidenced by a coin known as Tawila, minted around 920 by one of the Qarmathian rulers, and which was still in circulation in Hasa early in the twentieth century.

Some scholars have claimed that the society in which the Qarmatians lived could be described as proto-socialist or utopian socialist, a view that was also upheld by state ideologues in South Yemen. Perry Anderson described the Qarmatian state as "an egalitarian slave-owning republic". Others, including Azmi Bishara, have criticized the claims about Qarmatian socialism as an anachronistic projection of modern ideologies onto the past. Marshall Hodgson argues that the Qarmatians relied on the support of a rebellious peasantry and young men who "felt that the old way of life was to be swept away, the privileged classes overthrown, and pure justice was to reign".

=== Collapse ===
According to Farhad Daftary, the catalyst of the collapse of Qarmatian movement as a whole happened in the year 931, when Abu Tahir al-Janabi, the Qarmatian leader in Bahrain, handed over the reins of the state in Bahrain to Abu'l-Fadl al-Isfahani, a young Persian man who had been believed by the Qarmatians to be the Mahdi. However, Abu Tahir soon realized al-Isfahani's appointment was a disastrous mistake, after the "Mahdi" executed some nobles and insulted Muhammad and the other prophets. The incident shocked the Qarmatians and the Islamic community as a whole, and Abu Tahir ordered the youth's execution.

Al-Isfahani lasted as leader only 80 days before his execution but greatly weakened the credibility of Qarmatians within the Muslim community in general and heralded the beginning of the end of their revolutionary movements.

After their defeat by the Abbasids in 976, the Qarmatians began to look inwards and their status was reduced to that of a local power. This had severe consequences for the Qarmatians' ability to extract tribute from the region; according to Arabist historian Curtis Larsen:

As tribute payments were progressively cut off, either by the subsequent government in Iraq or by rival Arab tribes, the Carmathian state shrank to local dimensions. Bahrain broke away in CE 1058 under the leadership of Abu al-Bahlul al-Awwam who re-established orthodox Islam on the islands. Similar revolts removed from Carmathian control at about the same time. Deprived of all outside income and control of the coasts, the Carmathians retreated to their stronghold at the Hofuf Oasis. Their dynasty was finally dealt a final blow in 1067 by the combined forces of Abdullah bin Ali Al Uyuni, who with the help of Seljuk army contingents from Iraq, laid siege to Hofuf for seven years and finally forced the Carmathians to surrender.

In Bahrain and eastern Arabia, the Qarmatian state was replaced by the Uyunid dynasty, and it is believed that by the mid-11th century, Qarmatian communities in Iraq, Iran, and Transoxiana had either been integrated by Fatimid proselytism or disintegrated.

By the mid-10th century, persecution forced the Qarmatians to leave what is now Egypt and Iraq and move to the city of Multan, now in Pakistan. However, prejudice against the Qarmatians did not dwindle, as Mahmud of Ghazni led an expedition against Multan's Qarmatian ruler Abdul Fateh Daud in 1005. The city was surrendered, and Fateh Daud was permitted to retain control over the city with the condition that he adhere to Sunnism.

According to the maritime historian Dionisius A. Agius, the Qarmatians finally disappeared in 1067, after they lost their fleet at Bahrain Island and were expelled from Hasa near the Arabian coast by the chief of Banu Murra ibn Amir.

== Imamate of Seven Imams ==
According to Qarmatians, the number of imams was fixed, with Seven Imāms preordained by God. These groups considers Muhammad ibn Isma'il to be the messenger – prophet (Rasūl), Imam al-Qa'im and Mahdi to be preserved in hiding, which is referred to as Occultation.

| Imām | Personage | Period |
| 1 | Ali ibn Abi Talib: Imām | (632–661) |
| 2 | Hasan ibn Ali | (661–669) |
| 3 | Husayn ibn Ali | (669–680) |
| 4 | Ali ibn Husayn Zayn al-Abidin | (680–713) |
| 5 | Muhammad al-Baqir | (713–733) |
| 6 | Ja'far al-Sadiq | (733–765) |
| 7 | Muhammad ibn Isma'il: Imām al-Qā'im al-Mahdi also a messenger – prophet (Rasūl) | (775–813) |

== Ismaili imams not accepted as legitimate by Qarmatians ==
In addition, the following Ismaili imams after Muhammad ibn Isma'il had been considered heretics of dubious origins by certain Qarmatian groups, who refused to acknowledge the imamate of the Fatimids and clung to their belief in the coming of the Mahdi.

- Isma'il ibn Ja'far (765–775)
- Abadullah ibn Muhammad (Ahmad al-Wafi) (813–829)
- Ahmad ibn Abadullah (Muhammad at-Taqi) (829–840)
- Husayn ibn Ahmad (Radi Abdullah) (840–881)
- Abdallah al-Mahdi Billah (881–934) (Founder of Fatimid Caliphate)

== Qarmatian rulers in Eastern Arabia ==
- Abu Sa'id al-Jannabi (894–914)
- Abu Tahir al-Jannabi (914–944)
- Abu Mansur Ahmad (944–970)
- Abu al-Qasim Sa'id (970–972)
- Abu Yaqub Yousuf (972–977)
- Descendants of Abu Yaqub Yousuf ruled until 1077

== Substitution after Abu Tahir al-Jannabi ==
Farhad Daftary writes about the fate of the successors of Abu Tahir al-Jannabi:

It may be noted that at the time the Qarmaṭī state was still being ruled jointly by Abū Ṭāhir’s brothers. Abū Ṭāhir’s eldest son Sābūr (Shāpūr), who aspired to a ruling position and the command of the army, rebelled against his uncles in 358/969, but he was captured and executed in the same year. But the ruling sons of Abū Sa'īd al-Jannābī themselves did not survive much longer. Abū Manṣūr Aḥmad died in 359/970, probably of poisoning, and his eldest brother Abu’l-Qāsim Sa'īd died two years later. By 361/972, there remained of Abū Ṭāhir’s brothers only Abū Ya'qūb Yūsuf, who retained a position of pre-eminence in the Qarmaṭī state. Henceforth, the grandsons of Abū Sa'īd were also admitted to the ruling council. After the death of Abū Ya'qūb in 366/977, the Qarmaṭī state came to be ruled jointly by six of Abū Sa'īd’s grandsons, known collectively as al-sāda al-ru'asā'. Meanwhile, al-Ḥasan al-A'ṣam, son of Abū Manṣūr Aḥmad and a nephew of Abū Ṭāhir, had become the commander of the Qarmaṭī forces. He was usually selected for leading the Qarmaṭīs in military campaigns outside Baḥrayn, including their entanglements with the Fāṭimids.

== See also ==
- al-Hasa
- Khurramites
- Mazdakism
- Islamic schools and branches

== Sources ==
- Agius, Dionisius A. (2008). Classic Ships of Islam: From Mesopotamia to the Indian Ocean. Brill. ISBN 978-9004158634.
- Carra de Vaux, B. & Hodgson, M. G. S. (1965). "al-D̲j̲annābī, Abū Saʿīd Ḥasan b. Bahrām". In Lewis, B.; Pellat, Ch. & Schacht, J. (eds.). The Encyclopaedia of Islam, Second Edition. Volume II: C–G. Leiden: E. J. Brill. p. 452. OCLC 495469475.
- Daftary, Farhad (1995). The Assassin Legends Myths of the Isma'ilis. Bloomsbury Academic. ISBN 978-1850439509.
- Daftary, Farhad (1990). The Ismāʿı̄lı̄s: Their History and Doctrines (First ed.). Cambridge: Cambridge University Press. ISBN 978-0-521-37019-6.
- Madelung, Wilferd (1978). "Ḳarmaṭī". In van Donzel, E.; Lewis, B.; Pellat, Ch. & Bosworth, C. E. (eds.). The Encyclopaedia of Islam, Second Edition. Volume IV: Iran–Kha. Leiden: E. J. Brill. pp. 660–665. doi:10.1163/1573-3912_islam_COM_0451. ISBN 978-90-04-05745-6. OCLC 758278456.
- Madelung, Wilferd (1983). "ABŪ SAʿĪD JANNĀBĪ". In Yarshater, Ehsan (ed.). Encyclopædia Iranica. Vol. I/4: Abū Manṣūr Heravı̄–Adat. London and New York: Routledge & Kegan Paul. pp. 380–381. ISBN 978-0-71009-093-5.
- Madelung, Wilferd (1996). "The Fatimids and the Qarmatīs of Bahrayn". In Daftary, Farhad (ed.). Mediaeval Isma'ili History and Thought. Cambridge University Press. pp. 21–73. ISBN 978-0521003100.
- Kathryn Babayan 2002: Mystics, Monarchs, and Messiahs: Cultural Landscapes of Early Modern Iran, ISBN 0932885284
