= Abu Tahir al-Jannabi =

10th Century ruler of the Qarmatian state in Bahrayn

- Ruler of the Qarmatian state in Bahrayn
- Reign: 923–944
- Predecessor: Abu'l-Qasim Sa'id
- Successor: Succeeded by his 3 surviving brothers and nephews
- Born: c. 906; Ganaveh
- Died: 944; Bahrayn
Names
- Abu Tahir Suleyman Al-Jānnābi Ibn Hossein
- Dynasty: Qarmatian Emirate

Abu Tahir Sulayman al-Jannabi (Arabic: أبو طاهر سلیمان الجنّابي, romanized: Abū Tāhir Sulaymān al-Jannābī, Persian: ابوطاهر سلیمان گناوه‌ای, romanized: Abū-Tāher Soleimān Genāvei) was an Arabized Persian warlord and the ruler of the Qarmatian state in Bahrayn. He became the leader of the state in 923, after ousting his older brother Abu'l-Qasim Sa'id and immediately began an expansionist phase, raiding Basra that year. He raided Kufa in 927, defeating an Abbasid army in the process, and threatened the Abbasid capital Baghdad in 928 before pillaging much of Iraq when he could not gain entry to the city. In 930, he led the Qarmatians' most notorious attack when he attacked and pillaged Mecca and desecrated Islam's most sacred sites. Unable to gain entry to the city initially, Abu Tahir called upon the right of all Muslims to enter the city and gave his oath that he came in peace. Once inside the city walls the Qarmatian army set about massacring the pilgrims, taunting them with verses of the Quran as they did so. The bodies of the pilgrims were left to rot in the streets.

== Early life ==
Abu Tahir Suleyman al-Jannabi was an Arabized Persian, born in June-July 906 in Ganaveh, in coastal Fars (modern-day Iran). (Note: Other possible dates include 907 and 908.) His family was claimed to be of an Alid and a Sasanian descent. Abu Tahir's father Abu Sa'id was a tribal leader who had initiated the militarization of the Qarmatians. Abu Sa'id began preaching against Sunni Islam around 890 after being taught by his mentor Hamdan Qarmat, a native of Kufa, from whose name the Qarmatian sect is derived.

Abu Sa'id started off plundering caravans, traders and Persian hajj pilgrims en route to Mecca before gathering a large following. The Qarmatians soon mobilized an army and set out to lay siege to Basra. However, the governor of Basra learned of their preparations and informed the Abbasid Caliph, al-Muktafi, in Baghdad. The Caliph sent the general Abbas bin Umar to save Basra, but Abbas was defeated and his men executed and the Qarmatian siege was successful in capturing the city.

== Rise to power ==
Map of eastern and central Arabia in the 9th–10th centuries

Most Arabic sources agree that Abu Sa'id appointed his oldest son, Abu'l-Qasim Sa'id, as his heir, and that Abu Tahir led a revolt against him and usurped his power. Another tradition, by the Kufan anti-Isma'ili polemicist Abu Abd Allah Muhammad ibn Ali ibn Rizam al-Ta'i, on the other hand reports that Abu Sa'id always intended for Abu Tahir to succeed him, and had named Sa'id only as regent. According to this view, Sa'id handed over power to his younger brother (who was then barely ten years old) in 917/918. This report chimes with the story in Ibn Hawqal that Abu Sa'id had instructed his other sons to obey the youngest. Indeed, it is likely that power was nominally invested among all of Abu Sa'id's sons, with Abu Tahir being the dominant among them. Whatever the true events, Abu'l-Qasim was not executed, but lived until his death in 972.

== Early reign ==
Soon after succeeding al-Muktafi, Caliph al-Muqtadir recaptured Basra and ordered the re-fortification of the city. Abu Tahir successfully laid siege to the city once more, defeating the Abbasid army. After capturing Basra the Qarmatians proceeded to loot it and then withdrew. Abu Tahir returned again and ravaged it totally, destroying the grand mosque and reducing the marketplace to ashes. He ruled Bahrayn successfully during this time and corresponded with local and foreign rulers as far as north Africa, but continued successfully fighting off assaults from the Persians, who were allied with the Caliph in Baghdad.

== Conquests ==
Abu Tahir began to frequently raid Muslim pilgrims, reaching as far as the Hijaz region. On one of his raids he succeeded in capturing the Abbasid commander Abu'l-Haija ibn Hamdun. In 926 he led his army deep into Abbasid Iraq, reaching as far north as Kufa, forcing the Abbasids to pay large sums of money for him to leave the city in peace. On his way home he ravaged the outskirts of Kufa anyway. On his return, Abu Tahir began building palaces in the city of Ahsa, not only for himself but for his fellows, and declared the city his permanent capital. In 928 Caliph al-Muqtadir felt confident enough to once again confront Abu Tahir, calling in his generals Yusuf ibn Abi'l-Saj from Azerbaijan, Mu'nis al-Muzaffar and Harun. After a heavy battle all were beaten and driven back to Baghdad. Abu Tahir destroyed Jazirah Province as a final warning to the Abbasids and returned to Ahsa.

Abu Tahir thought that he had identified the Mahdi as a young Persian prisoner from Isfahan by the name of Abu'l-Fadl al-Isfahani, who claimed to be a descendant of the Sassanid Persian kings. Al-Isfahani had been brought back to Bahrayn from the Qarmatians' raid into Iraq in 928. In 931, Abu Tahir turned over the state to this Mahdi-Caliph, said, in fact, to be a Zoroastrian revivalist with anti-Arab sentiments. He reinstituted the veneration of fire and engaged in burning of religious books during an eighty-day rule. Isfahani also is thought to have some links with established Zoroastrian orthodoxy as the high priest of the Zoroastrians, Esfandiar Adarbad was executed by the Abbasid Caliph after being accused of complicity with Abu Tahir. His reign culminated in the execution of members of Bahrayn's notable families, including members of Abu Tahir's family. Abu Tahir's mother conspired to get rid of Abu'l-Fadl; she faked her death and sent a messenger to call the Mahdi to resurrect her. When he refused, he was exposed as being a normal human, and Abu Tahir's brother Sa'id killed Abu'l-Fadl after the Mahdi had reigned for only eighty days. Other accounts say fearing for his own life, Abu Tahir announced that he had been wrong and denounced the al-Isfahani as a false Mahdi. Begging forgiveness from the other notables, Abu Tahir had him executed.

== Sack of Mecca ==
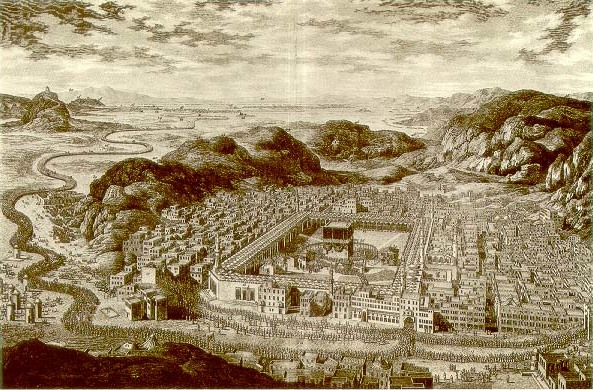
Abu Tahir desecrated Islam's holiest site after gaining entry (Mecca circa 1778)

Before Abu Tahir's rule, the Qarmatians had launched several raids along the pilgrim routes crossing Arabia. In 906, Qarmatians ambushed the pilgrim caravan returning from Mecca and massacred 20,000 pilgrims.

During the Hajj of 930 CE, Abu Tahir led the Qarmatians' most infamous attack when he pillaged Mecca and desecrated Islam's most sacred sites. Unable to gain entry to the city initially, he called upon the right of all Muslims to enter the city and gave his oath that he came in peace. Once inside the city walls, the Qarmatian army set about massacring the pilgrims, riding their horses into Masjid al-Haram and charging the praying pilgrims. They set the Kaaba on fire and smeared it with the blood of dead pilgrims. While killing pilgrims, he taunted them with verses of the Quran and verses of poetry: "I am by God, and by God I am ... he creates creation, and I destroy them".

The attack on Mecca symbolized the Qarmatians' break with the Islamic world; it was believed to have been aimed to prompt the appearance of the Mahdi who would bring about the final cycle of the world and end the era of Islam.

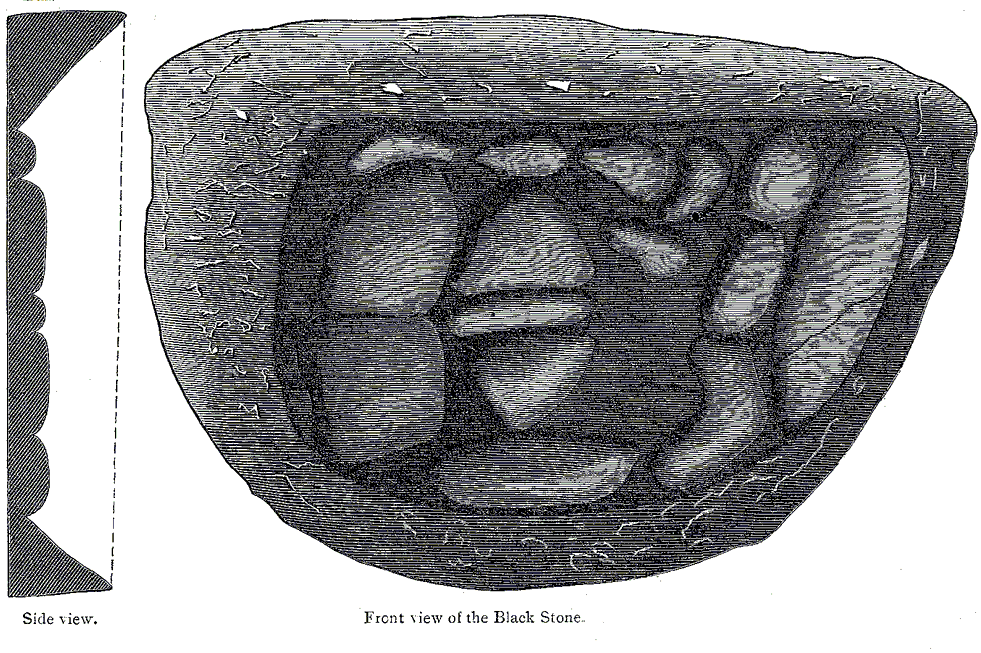
The fragmented Black Stone as it appeared in the 1850s, front and side illustrations

The Qarmatians defiled the Zamzam Well with the bodies of pilgrims and the black stone was stolen and taken to the oasis in Eastern Arabia known as al-Aḥsāʾ, where it remained until the Abbasids ransomed it in 952 CE. According to historian al-Juwayni, the stone was returned 22 years later in 951 under mysterious circumstances. Wrapped in a sack, it was thrown into the Great Mosque of Kufa in Iraq, accompanied by a note saying "By command we took it, and by command we have brought it back." The theft and removal of the Black Stone caused it to break into seven pieces. The basic shape and structure of the Kaaba have not changed since then.

The sack of Mecca followed millenarian excitement among the Qarmatians (and in Persia) over the conjunction of Saturn and Jupiter in 928. Bahrain became the seat of the Qarmatian Mahdi-Caliph from Isfahan who abolished Sharīa law. The new Mahdi also changed the qibla of prayer from Mecca to that of fire, a specifically Zoroastrian practice. Some scholars take the view that "they may not have been Ismailis at all at the outset, and their conduct and customs gave plausibility to the belief that they were not merely heretics but bitter enemies of Islam."

== Final years and death ==
Abu Tahir resumed the reins of the Qarmatian state and again began attacks on pilgrims crossing Arabia. Attempts by the Abbasids and Fatimids to persuade him to return the Black Stone were rejected.

He died in 944, around the age of 38, due to smallpox. He was succeeded by his three surviving sons and nephews.

== See also ==
- History of Bahrain
- 1979 Grand Mosque seizure
- Siege of Mecca (692)

== Sources ==
- Canard, M. (1965). "al-D̲j̲annābī, Abū Ṭāhir". In Lewis, B.; Pellat, Ch. & Schacht, J. (eds.). The Encyclopaedia of Islam, Second Edition. Volume II: C–G. Leiden: E. J. Brill. pp. 452–454. doi:10.1163/1573-3912_islam_SIM_1998. OCLC 495469475.
- Carra de Vaux, B. & Hodgson, M. G. S. (1965). "al-D̲j̲annābī, Abū Saʿīd Ḥasan b. Bahrām". In Lewis, B.; Pellat, Ch. & Schacht, J. (eds.). The Encyclopaedia of Islam, Second Edition. Volume II: C–G. Leiden: E. J. Brill. p. 452. OCLC 495469475.
- Daftary, Farhad (1995). The Assassin Legends Myths of the Isma'ilis. Bloomsbury Academic. ISBN 978-1-85043-950-9.
- Daftary, Farhad (1990). The Ismāʿı̄lı̄s: Their History and Doctrines (First ed.). Cambridge: Cambridge University Press. ISBN 978-0-521-37019-6.
- Daftary, Farhad (2018). "The Early Ismaili Imamate: Background to the Establishment of the Fatimid Caliphate". In Daftary, Farhad; Jiwa, Shainool (eds.). The Fatimid Caliphate: Diversity of Traditions. London and New York: I.B.Tauris, in association with the Institute of Ismaili Studies. pp. 10–21. ISBN 978-1-78831-133-5.
- Halm, Heinz (1996). The Empire of the Mahdi: The Rise of the Fatimids. Brill. ISBN 978-90-04-10056-5.
- Halm, Heinz (2018). "al-Jannābī, Abū Ṭāhir". In Madelung, Wilferd; Daftary, Farhad (eds.). Encyclopaedia Islamica Online. Brill Online. doi:10.1163/1573-3912_ei3_COM_32749. ISSN 1875-9831.
- Madelung, Wilferd (1996). "The Fatimids and the Qarmatīs of Bahrayn". In Daftary, Farhad (ed.). Mediaeval Isma'ili History and Thought. Cambridge University Press. pp. 21–73. ISBN 978-0-521-00310-0.
- Rezazadeh Langaroodi, Reza (2015). "Abū Ṭāhir al-Jannābī". In Madelung, Wilferd; Daftary, Farhad (eds.). Encyclopaedia Islamica Online. Translated by Farzin Negahban. Brill Online. ISSN 1875-9831.
- Madelung, Wilferd (1983). "ABŪ SAʿĪD JANNĀBĪ". In Yarshater, Ehsan (ed.). Encyclopædia Iranica. Vol. I/4: Abū Manṣūr Heravı̄–Adat. London and New York: Routledge & Kegan Paul. pp. 380–381. ISBN 978-0-71009-093-5.
- Rezazadeh Langaroodi, Reza (2014). "جنابی ابوطاهر سلیمان بن ابی سعید حسن" [Jannabi, Abu Taher Suleyman ibn Abi Sa'd Hassan]. Encyclopaedia of the World of Islam (in Persian). Tehran. OCLC 1049714918.
