= Farhad Daftary =

Iranian-British Islamic scholar (born 1938)

Farhad Daftary (Persian: فرهاد دفترى; born 1938) is a Belgian-born Iranian-British Islamic scholar who is co-director and head of the Department of Academic Research and Publications at the Institute of Ismaili Studies in London.

He was born in Brussels. Daftary received a Ph.D. in Economics from the University of California, Berkeley in 1971. He is a freelance consulting editor of the Encyclopædia Iranica, co-editor (with W. Madelung) of the Encyclopædia Islamica, and the general editor of the Ismaili Heritage Series and the Ismaili Texts and Translations Series.

== Selected works ==
Books authored

- Daftary, Farhad (2007), The Isma'ilis: Their History and Doctrines, Cambridge University Press, ISBN 978-0-521-42974-0
- Daftary, Farhad (1994), The Assassin Legends: Myths of the Ismaʻilis, I.B. Tauris, ISBN 978-1-85043-705-5
- Daftary, Farhad (1998), A short history of the Ismailis, Edinburgh University Press, ISBN 978-0-7486-0687-0
- Daftary, Farhad (2004), Ismaili literature, I.B.Tauris, ISBN 978-1-85043-439-9
- Daftary, Farhad (2005), Ismailis in medieval Muslim societies, I.B.Tauris, ISBN 978-1-84511-091-8
- Daftary, Farhad; Hirji, Zulfikar (2008), The Ismailis: An Illustrated History, Azimuth Editions, ISBN 978-1-898592-26-6
- Daftary, Farhad (2020), The Ismaili Imams: A Biographical History, Bloomsbury Academic, ISBN 9780755617982

Books edited

- Daftary, Farhad, ed. (2001), Intellectual Traditions in Islam, I.B. Tauris, ISBN 978-1-86064-760-4
- Daftary, Farhad, ed. (2001), Mediaeval Isma'ili History and Thought, Cambridge University Press, ISBN 978-0-521-00310-0
- Daftary, Farhad; Meri, Josef, eds. (2003), Culture and memory in medieval Islam: essays in honour of Wilferd Madelung, I.B. Tauris, ISBN 978-1-86064-859-5
- Daftary, Farhad; Fernea, Elizabeth; Nanji, Azim, eds. (2010), Living in Historic Cairo: Past and Present in an Islamic City, University of Washington Press, ISBN 978-1-898592-28-0
- Daftary, Farhad, ed. (2011), A Modern History of the Ismailis: Continuity and Change in a Muslim Community, I.B. Tauris, ISBN 978-1-84511-717-7
