= Uyunid-Ayyashid war =

Military conflict 1077

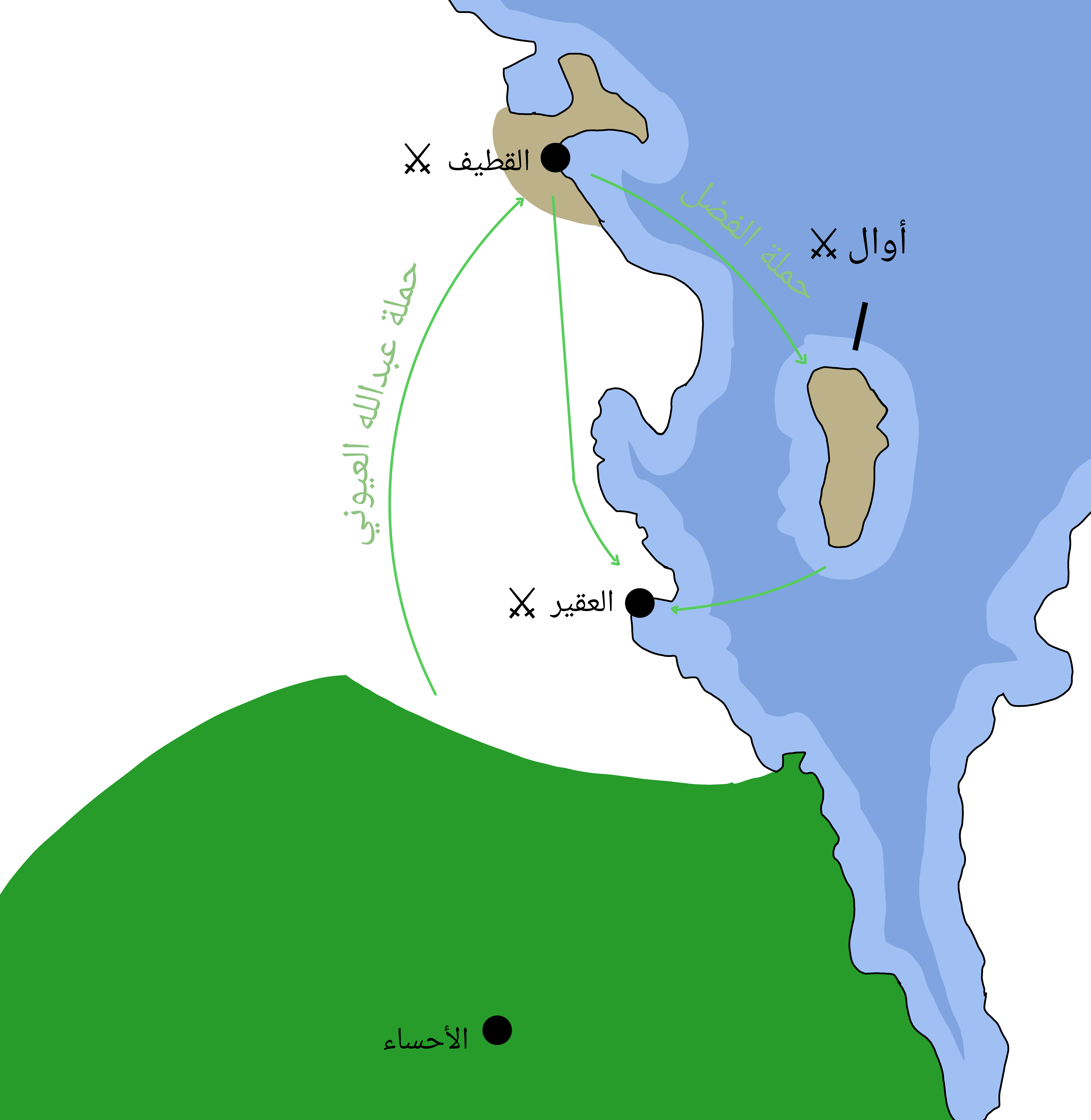
- An map in Arabic, detailing the military campaign of Abdullah al-Uyuni and his son, al-Fadl, against the Ayyashids.
Date	1077
Location	Eastern Arabia
Result	Uyunid victory
Territorial changes	Fall of the Ayyashid Emirate, the Uyunid Emirate add Qatif and Awal to their domains

Belligerents
Uyunid Emirate: Banu Abd al-Qays	Ayyashid Emirate; Bedouins of Uqair (later)

Commanders and leaders
Abdullah ibn Ali al-Uyuni al-Fadl ibn Abdullah al-Uyuni; Abu Yusuf Ali ibn Yusuf al-Uyuni (POW); Abu Sa'id al-Hasan ibn Ali al-Uyuni; Muhammad ibn Abi al-Hawari	Zakariyya ibn Yahya † al-Hasan ibn Yahya X al-Akrut †

The Uyunid–Ayyashid War, was a military conflict that took place in 1077 between the Uyunid emirate and the Ayyashid emirate; it was sparked by the Ayyashids' desire to seize control of Al-Ahsa and rule over it.

== Background ==
The Overthrow of the Qarmatians paved the way for the rise of several new states and figures. Among them was Yahya ibn Ayyash al-Judhami, who established an independent rule in al-Qatif. He was succeeded by his son, Zakariya, who conquered the island of Awal—seizing it from Abu al-Bahlul al-Awwam—and incorporated it into his own domains. During this same period, Abdullah ibn Ali al-Uyuni rose up against the Qarmatians, launching a protracted rebellion that ultimately ended in a victory for the Uyunids; they seized al-Ahsa, effectively bringing an end to the Qarmatian state. Meanwhile, the Ayyashids watched the situation from afar. Al-Hasan ibn Zakariya, seeking to bring the entire region of Eastern Arabia under Ayyashid authority, set his sights on al-Ahsa and decided to launch an attack against the Uyunid emirate.

== War ==
=== al-Hasan ibn Yahya ibn Ayyash's raids on the Uyunids ===
Al-Hasan ibn Ayyash began launching raids against the Uyunids and their territories, aiming to destabilize them and portray them as weak in the eyes of the inhabitants and tribes of Al-Ahsa; however, these efforts proved unsuccessful and changed nothing. Al-Hasan then attempted to win over members of the Al Ibrahim clan, corresponding with some of them and offering money, gifts, jewels, date palms, produce, and land grants in Qatif—yet none of them responded. Furthermore, Al-Hasan failed to entice Uyunid commanders, such as Muhammad ibn Abi al-Hawari, to his side, despite his attempts to sway them with offers of money.

One of the Ayyashid detachments that set out to attack Al-Ahsa was pursued by Abu Yusuf Ali ibn Yusuf ibn Dhabar ibn Abdullah al-Uyuni. Although the latter succeeded in driving them out of Al-Ahsa, he was struck by a blow that knocked him from his horse and led to his capture. Al-Hasan treated Ali ibn Yusuf with great honor, providing him with a residence and a physician; he even offered him a permanent place to stay, a salary of one thousand dinars, and a land grant in Qatif. Ali ibn Yusuf replied, "The day I see Abdullah ibn Ali again is dearer to me than Qatif and all its wealth." Consequently, Al-Hasan gave him some money and gifts, then set him free. Despite failing to recruit Abu Yusuf, Al-Hasan did succeed in winning over the emir Abu Sa'id al-Hasan ibn Ali ibn Abdullah al-Uyuni, who rebelled against his own grandfather and moved with his followers to Qatif. From there, he participated in raids against Al-Ahsa, though these, too, met with little success. Eventually, Al-Hasan attempted to negotiate a peace treaty with Abdullah al-Uyuni, offering him a large sum of money and gold, along with a significant number of date palms; however, Abdullah al-Uyuni rejected the proposal—though some accounts suggest it was actually Abdullah who initiated a truce and provided gifts. In the end, Al-Hasan did not live long enough to take further action, as he was killed by his own brother, Zakariya ibn Yahya, the Emir of Qatif.

=== Battle of Nazira ===
Once Zakariya ibn Yahya had consolidated sole power in Qatif, he decided to abandon the practice of sporadic raids and instead assemble a large, formidable army with the aim of attacking the Uyunid emirate and eliminating it once and for all. This army set out and established a camp at a village called Nazirah, while the soldiers of the Ayyashids conducted raids on nearby farms and villages to secure provisions. Upon learning of Zakariya ibn Yahya's approach, Abdullah al-Uyuni gathered an army—comprising his own kin, his clan, and a number of horsemen from the Banu Abd al-Qays—and launched an assault on Zakariya and his forces at Nazirah. A bloody battle ensued, which ended in a crushing defeat for Zakariya ibn Ayyash and his army.

=== Fall of Qatif and Battle of Awal ===
Following the defeat, Zakariya gathered the remnants of his army and fled to Qatif. Abdullah al-Uyuni pursued him with a force of a thousand horsemen, succeeding in killing many of the fugitives. Upon his arrival in Qatif, Zakariya realized that defending the city or using it as a stronghold was impossible; he therefore boarded his ships and sought refuge on the island of Awal. Abdullah al-Uyuni entered Qatif in 1077. Learning of Zakariya's escape to Awal, Abdullah ordered his son, al-Fadl, to pursue him and cross over to the island. Al-Fadl successfully attacked Awal, leading to a battle that ended in a defeat for the Ayyashids. Al-Akrut, Zakariya's vizier, was killed after fighting with great courage and heroism, though Zakariya managed to escape. Zakariya fled toward the port of Al-Uqayr, where he rallied the Bedouin tribes to his cause and led them back toward Qatif in an attempt to reclaim it. There, he found Abdullah al-Uyuni waiting for him. A second battle ensued; the Uyunids initially withstood the Bedouin assaults, but then launched a powerful counterattack that annihilated the entire Ayyashid army. This time, Zakariya ibn Yahya was killed.

== Aftermath ==
Thus, the Ayyashid emirate fell after ten years of rule, leaving the field open for Abdullah al-Uyuni and his new state. He incorporated Qatif, Awal, and Uqair into his emirate, thereby unifying almost the entire region of Eastern Arabia.
