= Battle of Bab al-Asfar =

- Part of Overthrow of the Qarmatians
Date	1077
Location	Between Bab al-Asfar and Qasr al-Khandaq, Northern Wall, al-Ahsa
Result	Uyunid victory: Dissulotion of the Qarmatians

Belligerents
Uyunid Emirate; Seljuk Empire	Qarmatians: Qahtan; Atik; Hadan

Commanders and leaders
Abdullah ibn Ali al-Uyuni; Al-Baqush	Unknown (POW)

Battle of Bab al-Asfar, also known as the Second Battle of al-Khandaq, took place in the northern part of al-Ahsa, between Bab al-Asfar and al-Khandaq Palace. It occurred in 1077 as a result of a rebellion by the Qarmatians and their supporters against the Uyunids rule over the region of al-Ahsa.

After Abdullah bin Ali al-Uyuni entered al-Ahsa and the Qarmatian state collapsed, he granted safety to the remaining Qarmatians in exchange for their surrender of the palace. Once Abdullah had established the foundations of his new state, he began stripping the Arab tribes of the power they had held under the Qarmatians. This fueled their resentment toward the new authority; the remnants of the Qarmatians reached out to them and incited them to rebel. Consequently, a coalition of tribes—most notably the Amir Rabi‘a—confronted the Uyunid Emirate and its Seljuk allies in the Battle of Malham and Sulaysil in 1077, but they suffered a crushing defeat.

After defeating these tribes, Abdullah turned to fight the Qarmatians—a group to whom he had previously granted security, only for them to betray him. The Qarmatians were supported by two Qahtani Yemeni tribes, Atik and Haddan, whom they had brought into the region in 1067. The two forces met between Qasr al-Khandaq and Bab al-Asfar, north of the city of al-Ahsa. There, a battle took place in which Abdullah inflicted a crushing defeat upon the Qarmatians and their allies, taking a large number of them captive.

This battle brought an end to the Qarmatians as an organized entity; thereafter, all traces of them vanished from Eastern Arabia. Abdullah relocated their leaders—along with their families and the remnants of the Yemeni and Azdi tribes—to Oman, where they lived in exile. In doing so, Abdullah al-Uyuni rid his state of one of its most significant threats.
