= Ayyashid Emirate =

Medieval State of Eastern Arabia

Ayyashid Emirate, also known as the Emirate of Banu Ayyash, was a former state that emerged in the city of Qatif, in the eastern Arabian Peninsula, following the decline of the Qarmatians' influence in Al-Ahsa. It was named after its ruling dynasty, the "Al-Ayyash" family, and existed between c. 1067 and 1077.

== History ==
=== Ayyashid Revolt ===
In the middle of the eleventh century, signs of weakness began to appear within the Qarmatian state. Yahya ibn Ayyash al-Judhami—a member of the Banu Muharib clan, which belonged to the Banu Abd al-Qays tribe—was able to lead a revolt against the Qarmatians, establish his independence in the city of Qatif, and proclaim himself its emir.

=== Yahya ibn Ayyash (1067-1076) ===
Yahya sent a request for support and assistance to the Abbasid Caliph al-Qa'im bi-Amr Allah, the Seljuk Sultan Malik-Shah, and the vizier Nizam al-Mulk. They responded to his appeal by dispatching a Seljuk army led by one of the Sultan’s chamberlains, named Kajkina. En route, Kajkina encountered some Bedouins who engaged him in skirmishes, but he managed to defeat them. Upon the Seljuk army’s arrival in Qatif, Yahya ibn Ayyash—wary of the army’s strength—refused to come out to meet Kajkina and instead swayed the Arab tribesmen within the Seljuk ranks to his side. He then engaged Kajkina in battle, ultimately defeating him, as Kajkina lacked experience in fighting within that particular terrain. The position of Kajkina and his army weakened further as many of the Arab tribesmen deserted; consequently, he was forced to retreat, eventually reaching Basra in a dire state in 1075. Subsequently, Yahya brought the Qatif region and its surroundings under his control and began planning an invasion of the island of Awal—then ruled by the Al al-Zajjaj dynasty—but he passed away in 1076 before he could carry out this ambition.

=== Zakriyya ibn Yahya (1076-1077) ===
Zakariya ibn Yahya ibn Ayyash assumed the emirate of Qatif and set about preparing a fleet and an army, which he led personally to Awal. There, he attacked the island and engaged in a fierce battle against its ruler, Abu al-Bahlul al-Awwam. In 1076, Zakariya defeated and killed al-Awwam, annexing his territories to the Ayyash emirate. However, in February–March 1077, a Seljuk army led by Artuq Bey attacked Qatif in retaliation for the death of the Seljuk commander Kajkina. Having learned of the Seljuk army’s approach in advance, Zakariya fled to Awal. Artuq Bey seized the city and stationed a garrison there; yet, once Artuq Bey departed for Baghdad, Ibn Ayyash launched an attack, ousted the Seljuk governor, and restored the city.

Zakariya had a brother named al-Hasan, who was known for his courage and boldness and shared a significant degree of power with him. In 1076, al-Ahsa—a territory the Al al-Ayyash family had long coveted—fell to Abdullah bin Ali al-Uyuni, who established his own state there. Observing the growing power of the Uyunids and desiring to seize control from them, al-Hasan began launching raids against them to undermine their stability; he later attempted to win over some members of the Al Ibrahim clan, but failed. Relations between the brothers, Zakariya and al-Hasan, deteriorated—either because Zakariya disapproved of al-Hasan’s policy toward the Uyunids and the excessive concessions he made to them, or because al-Hasan’s influence had grown to the point where he commanded the support of many tribes and inhabitants of Qatif. Consequently, Zakariya—in collusion with his vizier, al-Akrut—hatched a plot that resulted in the killing of al-Hasan ibn Yahya ibn Ayyash, leaving Zakariya as the sole ruler.

Zakariya continued the war against the Uyunid Emirate, assembling an army to launch an attack. However, he suffered a crushing defeat at the Battle of Nazirah and was forced to flee with the remnants of his forces—first to Qatif, and subsequently to Awal—leaving Qatif to fall under Uyunid control. Abdullah then dispatched his son, al-Fadl, to strike at Zakariya and his troops in Awal. There, Zakariya suffered another defeat, during which his vizier, al-Akrut, was killed. With the fall of Awal, the Ayyashid Emirate collapsed, having lost all its territories. Zakariya fled to the port of al-Uqayr, where he rallied local Bedouin tribes to his cause and attempted to attack Qatif once more. He met a final, decisive defeat, which resulted in his own death and the total annihilation of his army—marking the end of the Ayyashid Dynasty.

== List of Emirs ==
This is a list with the rulers of the Ayyashid Dynasty:

- Yahya ibn Ayyash (c. 1067-1076)
- Zakariyya ibn Yahya (1076-1077)
