= Abu al-Bahlul al-Awwam's Revolt =

- Part of Overthrow of the Qarmatians
- A map showing Abu al-Bahlul's most prominent clashes with the Qarmatians.
Date	1064-1065
Location	Awal (modern-day Bahrain)
Result	Abu al-Bahlul's victory
Territorial changes	The establishment of the Al-Zajjaj Emirate in Bahrain, and its definitive exit from Qarmatian rule

Belligerents
Abu al-Bahlul's forces Abu al-Qasim's forces	Qarmatians; Banu 'Amir Rabia

Commanders and leaders
Abu al-Bahlul al-Awwam; Abu al-Qasim ibn Abi al-'Aryan X	Abdallah ibn Sunbur; Awal's Governor; Ibn Sunbur's son †; Bishr ibn Muflih al-Uyuni

Strength
30,000 men Battle of Kaskous: 100 ships	Battle of Kaskous: 500 cavalry 180 ships

Casualties and losses
Unknwon	The Ambush: 41 killed Battle of Kaskous: 40 killed many captured

Abu al-Bahlul al-Awwam's Revolt, was a military revolt that happened c. 1063, led by al-Awwam ibn Muslim against the Qarmatian rule in Awal Island (modern-day Bahrain).

== Background ==
Abu al-Bahlul al-Awwam ibn Muhammad ibn Yusuf ibn al-Zujaj, of the Banu Abd al-Qays tribe, served as the tax collector for the Qarmatians in the island of Awal. He had a brother named Abu al-Walid Muslim, who was a khatib following the Hanafi school. Abu al-Bahlul succeeded in persuading the governor of Awal, Ja'far ibn Abi Muhammad ibn 'Arham, to authorize the construction of a mosque where Friday prayers could be held—a move intended to encourage Sunni merchants to visit the island. Ibn 'Arham granted permission, and Abu al-Bahlul spent 3,000 dinars on the mosque's construction. Upon its completion in 1056, Abu al-Walid ascended the minbar and delivered the khutbah in the name of the Sunni Abbasid Caliph in Baghdad, al-Qa'im bi-Amr Allah. This angered the island's inhabitants, who were Ismaili Shi'a; and on the following Friday, they attempted to prevent Abu al-Walid and Abu al-Bahlul from reaching the minbar. In response, the brothers addressed the incensed crowd, saying: "We did not part with our wealth or hand it over except for this very purpose—for the sake of this faith, to attract foreigners to our shores, and to foster commercial relations with them. If you find this objectionable, then return to us what you have taken, and we shall abandon our objective, though doing so would surely diminish our trade and our profits." Abu al-Bahlul subsequently sent a message to the Qarmatian leadership in al-Ahsa conveying the same point. The Qarmatians ultimately agreed to allow Abu al-Bahlul and his kin to practice their faith and conduct their sermons as they saw fit.

Thus, the influence of the Al-Zujaj family on Awal grew. However, objections from the Shia community persisted; this time, because Al-Basasiri had entered Baghdad in 1058 and ordered that the khutbah be delivered in the name of Al-Mustansir Billah, the Shia Fatimid Caliph in Cairo. Consequently, Abu al-Bahlul and his brother were expected to do the same. Abu al-Bahlul refused, however, and sent a highly valuable gift to the Qarmatians to ensure they would not intervene. Their response was favorable; they decreed that "no established practice of Abu al-Bahlul should be altered, nor any of his terms annulled, and his brother may deliver the khutbah whenever and however he chooses." As a result, Abu al-Bahlul's influence expanded even further. The Qarmatians then ordered Ibn 'Arham, the governor of Awal, to increase taxes. When he informed the island's notables and prominent figures, they collectively agreed to refuse the new levies. Ibn 'Arham reported this refusal to the Qarmatians, explaining that he could not extract the funds by force. In response, they dismissed him and appointed a new governor—whose name is not recorded—a harsh man who seized the wealth of the affluent through brutal, coercive methods, alienating the entire population.

Abu al-Bahlul gathered his family, his associates, and the notables he trusted to discuss the situation, revealing his intention to resist. They pledged their support and obedience to him, and he emphasized the necessity of bringing Abu al-Qasim ibn Abi al-Aryan into the resistance. Abu al-Qasim was one of the most important notables and leaders of Awal. Abu al-Bahlul approached him and proposed that he join his uprising, saying: "These people have come forward, listened to me, and pledged their obedience; yet, I am not suited for this task unless you join me—let us work hand in hand. If you do so, we can support and assist one another, and safeguard ourselves and our property." Abu al-Qasim agreed to join tal-Awwam in fighting the Qarmatians, with the goal of reinstating Ibn 'Arham as the governor of Awal.

== Revolt ==
=== First clashes ===
Abu al-Bahlul and Ibn Abi al-‘Aryan gathered a force of thirty thousand men. Upon learning of this, the governor became alarmed and resolved to eliminate the rebels; however, Abu al-Bahlul caught him off guard with a surprise attack. A battle ensued, ending in the defeat of the Qarmatians and the flight of the governor to al-Ahsa. Abu al-Bahlul sent word to the Qarmatians, declaring that he would not end his rebellion unless Ibn ‘Arham was reinstated as the governor of Awal. The Qarmatians responded by threatening to dispatch an army to punish Abu al-Bahlul and his followers. Meanwhile, the Qarmatian vizier, Abd Allah ibn Sanbar, sent one of his sons to Oman to procure weapons, as the Qarmatians were poorly armed. Abu al-Bahlul al-‘Awwam, having learned of this, set an ambush along the return route. He killed the vizier’s son along with the forty men who had accompanied him, and the rebels seized the funds and weaponry they had brought—amounting to five thousand dinars and three thousand spears.

=== Ibn Abi al-‘Aryan's treason ===
When the Qarmatians learned of what had transpired, they decided to sow internal conflict and discord within the ranks of the rebels. Ibn Sanbar reached out to Abu al-Qasim ibn Abi al-‘Aryan, winning him over with a large sum of money and a promise to appoint him governor of Awal. Ibn Abi al-‘Aryan agreed and requested that the Qarmatians send a naval fleet to attack Abu al-Bahlul from the outside, while he would launch an assault from within. Abu al-Qasim then gathered his followers and told them that defeating the Qarmatians was impossible and that, for the time being, they ought to mend what they had broken. They pledged their obedience, and Abu al-Qasim officially declared his defection from Abu al-Bahlul to the side of the Qarmatians. Upon learning of this, Abu al-Bahlul gathered his own men and remarked, "We cannot confront Ibn Abi al-‘Aryan through direct force, for he is stronger than us and commands more men; we must use a more subtle approach." Consequently, Abu al-Bahlul approached one of Ibn Abi al-‘Aryan's cousins and conspired with him to assassinate him. The assassination took place while Abu al-Qasim was bathing at the spring of Bu Zaydan. When his kin and followers discovered his body, they accused Abu al-Bahlul; however, he swore that he had no hand in the matter. He then hosted them and treated them with such generosity that their resentment faded, and they put the incident behind them—thus, Abu al-Bahlul successfully eliminated a dangerous adversary.

=== Battle of Kaskous Awal ===
Upon learning of the death of his ally, vizier Ibn Sanbar assembled a fleet of 180 ships. Given the Qarmatians' lack of adequate weaponry, they enlisted the aid of the 'Amir Rabia Bedouins, who boarded the vessels accompanied by their horses—numbering five hundred in total. The command of the fleet was taken over by Bishr ibn Muflih al-Uyuni, and the Uyunid Clan had been in the service of the Qarmatians. Abu al-Bahlul prepared to confront them, organizing a fleet of 100 ships and rallying his people to resist. During his preparations, however, he fell from his horse and broke his leg. Although his brother, Abu al-Walid, urged him to sit out the battle due to his injury, Abu al-Bahlul insisted on leading the forces himself. As the Qarmatian fleet appeared, Abu al-Bahlul ordered his men to hoist banners, beat drums, and sound trumpets. The resulting clamor terrified the untrained Bedouin horses; their frantic agitation caused many of the ships to capsize and sink. Strong winds further exacerbated the situation, leading to a victory for Abu al-Bahlul and the rout of Ibn Sanbar, who was forced to flee to the coast. Abu al-Bahlul seized the surviving vessels, along with two hundred horses and a large cache of weapons. The Bedouins aboard the ships surrendered, swearing that Ibn Sanbar had coerced them into fighting. Forty Qarmatians were also captured and subsequently executed. This battle secured the success of Abu al-Bahlul's uprising and led to the establishment of the Banu al-Zujaj emirate in 1065.

== Aftermath ==
The attacks by the Zujjajids against the Qarmatians continued thereafter. Abu al-Bahlul's vizier and brother, Abu al-Walid Muslim—led raids across all parts of al-Ahsa; most notably, he spearheaded an assault on the port of al-Uqayr, which resulted in the port's total destruction. Abu al-Bahlul attempted to establish contact with Abu Mansur ibn Yusuf, an official in the Abbasid Caliph's administration, but before a response could arrive, Yahya ibn Ayyash—a rebel against the Qarmatians in Qatif—invaded Awal, bringing an end to the Emirate of Al al-Zujaj.
