= Uyunid Revolt =

- Part of Overthrow of the Qarmatians
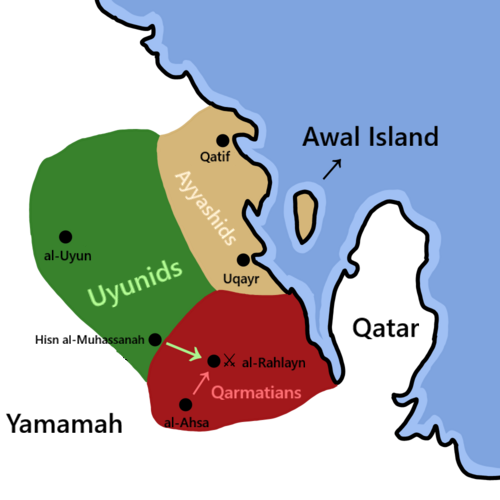
- A map showing the location of the Battle of Al-Rahlayn, the final battle of the revolt, and the route of the armies of the warring parties.
Date	1069-1076
Location	Eastern Arabia, Al-Ahsa Region
Result	Uyunid-Seljuk-Abbasid victory
Territorial changes	Uyunid Emirate established in al-Ahsa; Qarmatian rule in Eastern Arabia overthrown

Belligerents
Banu Abd al-Qays: Uyunid dynasty; Abbasid Caliphate: Seljuk Empire (since 1076)	Qarmatians: Qahtan; 'Atik; Haddan; 'Amir Rabia; Azd

Commanders and leaders
Abdullah bin Ali al-Uyuni; Artuq Beg; Al-Baaqush	Unknown

Uyunid Revolt was a military revolt that occurred between 1069 and 1076, led by Abdullah al-Uyuni and later supported by the Seljuk Empire, against the Ismaili Qarmatian State in Eastern Arabia.

== Background ==
The Qarmatians gradually lost important sites in Eastern Arabia, namely: Awal Island and the city of Qatif, in addition to Abu Al-Bahloul Al-Awwam sabotaging the Qarmatian port of Uqair. The Qarmatians had no influence left in the region except in the city of Al-Ahsa, the center of their state. The Qarmatians tried to fortify their city, but the people of Al-Ahsa refused to help. Therefore, the Qarmatians sought help from Yemeni tribes, and some of the Qahtan tribes responded to the call of the Qarmatians, and it is believed that they were the Azd tribe, and thus the Qarmatians fortified their city with the help of the Yemeni tribes in 1066, that is, three years before Abdullah al-Uyuni’s revolt.

Many tribes wished for the Qarmaians to fall, so they started gathering around Abdullah bin Ali al-Uyuni, from Al Ibrahim of Banu Abd al-Qays tribe, appointing him as their leader, clans from Banu Wahb and Banu Yazid joined him and fought on other fronts in Uman.

== Revolt ==
=== Beginning of the revolt ===
In 1069, and seeing the big support he had, Abdullah moved from al-Uyun to Al-Muhassanah where he started organising his forces, and then began clashing with the Qarmatians day and night, relying heavily on his cousing and relatives from Abd al-Qays, he had 400 cavalry men at that time. While the Qarmatians were only supported by 'Amir Rabia, Azd, and Qahtan. The first battle occurred near al-Khandaq River between the northern walls of a Qarmatian palace and a gate known as "Bab al-Asfar" or "Bab al-Asghar", according to Ibn Muqrib, the Qarmatians were "under the command of eighty of their emirs, descendants of Abu Tahir al-Jannabi, the founder of the state. They rode their armored horses, fully prepared, and were accompanied by their soldiers and court officials", which might be an exaggeration, considering that the rebels only had 400 cavalry. And yet, Abdullah al-Uyuni and his men ended up crushing the Qarmatian forces, killing 80 of them, destroying their Bedouin support, and forcing them to stay in their forts, thus the First Battle of al-Khandaq ended in a rebel victory.

=== Seljuk involvement and Siege of Ahsa ===
But Abdullah, despite the financial support from his family, couldn't really remove the Qarmatians or seize al-Ahsa, with the small numbers he had and without support, as the Arab tribes either joined the Qarmatians or remained neutral, and for this reason, Abdullah sent a speech in 1072 to Caliph al-Qai'm and Sultan Malik-shah I and Nizam al-Mulk, asking help and military support from them, ans explaining the suffering in the region because of the Qarmatians, and declared that he will pledge allegiance to the Abbasid Caliphate and establish the Abbasid dawa in al-Ahsa in case he won. The speech found the support of Malik-Shah, and after negotiations between the caliph and the Uyunid messenger, the Caliphate sent an army of 7,000 cavalry led by Artuq Beg, known in Arabian sources as Aksek Salar. The army moved from Baghdad in the beginning of 1076, looting al-Basra and capturing al-Qatif on the road, then meeting Abdullah al-Uyuni. After the two armies joined, they started capturing every Qarmatian fort, Artuq Beg looted the orchards and farms surrounding Al-Ahsa City, he also attacked the tribes living around Al-Ahsa and took their money and provisions, and captured a fort where the Qarmatian stored their food. His goal in all of this was to weaken the Qarmatians economically and to scatter the tribes that might help them to withstand that siege with food supplies and other similar aid, causing 'Amir Rabia to abandon the Qarmatian cause and completely leave the al-Ahsa region.

When the siege of Ahsa went for so long, it started affecting the Qarmatians and their economy. Food and provisions decreased, cows and crops perished, meat became scarce, and only a little bit of dates and some dried fish remained for the besieged, so they asked for a truce for a month, and they promised gathering 10,000 dinars from the owners of farms and ranches, and gave 13 of their elders as hostages until the ransom is paid, Artuq Beg agreed, but the moment he lifted the siege, the Qarmatians went to caves where they hid food for emergency, they took all what was there and took it to al-Ahsaa, then knowing that the Seljuk Turk soldiers would not be able to withstand it again due to the arrival of summer and the intense heat, and because the foreign Seljuk soldiers could not endure living in that region due to the extreme heat, in addition to the scarcity of provisions and supplies. Also with coming of the summer, the Harvest comes with it, and so the many farms and gardens would be useful. Indeed, the Qarmatians broke the truce concluded with Artuq Beg and fortified themselves behind the walls of the city of al-Ahsa.

When Artuq Beg returned and found that the Qarmatians had betrayed his trust, he instantly killed some of the hostages and kept those who he thought were useful, the siege continued for a long time, but then, just like the Qarmatians planned, the summer arrived. The Turks suffered from many diseases, such as fever, as a result of the abundance of swamps in the farms of Al-Ahsa. The intense heat also led to the soldiers becoming averse to the army and instilling boredom in them. Moreover, the lines of communication and supplies for the army with far-away Basra were stretched, and provisions began to dwindle. The Seljuk soldiers had previously destroyed the crops surrounding al-Ahsa, so they became devoid of fruits. Artuq Beg sensed the difficulty of the situation and decided to withdraw. He told Abdullah that he was leaving for Baghdad to bring support, Abdullah agreed but asked him to leave 200 Seljuk soldier with him, telling that is the only thing he needed, Artuq Beg agreed and left 200 of his men under the leadership of his brother al-Baqush, then returned to Basra after extracting taxes from A'idh and Qabath tribes. After hearing that the powerful Seljuk army had left, 'Amir Rabia tribes returned to al-Ahsa.

=== Battle of al-Rahlayn (1076) ===
Though Artuq Beg withdrew, Abdullah continued his siege of al-Ahsa, so the Qarmatians asked for help from 'Amir Rabia tribe. According to the sources of that time, 'Amir Rabia came with huge numbers that even the Seljuk men became afraid, the sources claimed Qarmatians and Rabia had 30,000 men while Abdullah al-Uyuni only had 600 soldiers, including the army of al-Baqush, but this is clearly an exaggeration. Abdullah decided to start attacking Rabia first, and met his foes in al-Rahlayn, he crushed 'Amir Rabia forcing them to flee, then faced the Qarmatians and defeated them and their Yemeni allies, then he marched on al-Ahsa and captured it.

== Aftermath ==
After his victory, Abdullah made a treaty with the Qarmatians left in the palace, stipulating that he would spare their lives and they would surrender to him the palace and all the wealth inside it and they should remain in al-Ahsa with their allies. Abdullah thus seized the Qarmatian Palace and the center of rule in al-Ahsa. He didn't allow the Seljuks to enter the palace, out of fear that they might intervene in the matters of ruling. Al-Baqush sent word to his brother that the Qarmatian Palace had fallen. The message reached Artuq Beg when he was in Wasit heading towards al-Ahsa to continue the campaign. Artuq Beg himself sent a message to the Abbasid caliph, informing him of the victory. The message reached Baghdad in 1077, and Abdullah pledged his allegiance to the Abbasid Caliphate, and thus, the Uyunid Emirate was established.
