= Overthrow of the Qarmatians =

War between the Qarmatians & Seljuk Supported Uyunids

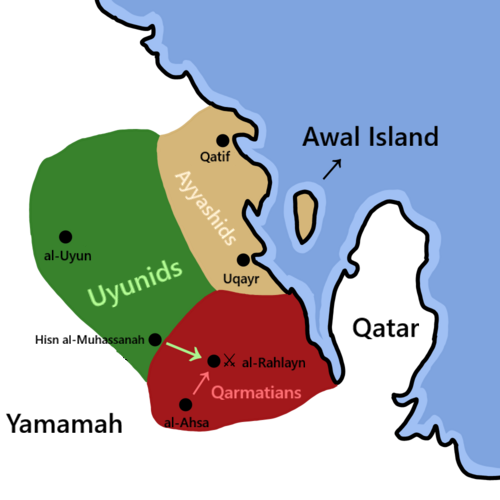
- Battle of al-Rahlayn, the decisive battle in the Uyunid Revolt.
Date	1058–1077
Location	Eastern Arabia
Result	Abbasid–Uyunid–Seljuk victory
Territorial changes	Fall of the Qarmatian state

Belligerents
Qarmatians	Uyunid Emirate; Supported by: Seljuk Empire; Abbasid Caliphate	Ayyashid Emirate Abu al-Bahlul al-Awwam's forces (1058–1067)

Commanders and leaders
Abu Abdullah ibn Sanbar (executed); Yahya bin Abbas (executed)	Abdullah bin Ali Al Uyuni	Yahya bin Ayash # Zakariya bin Yahya † Abu al-Bahlul al-Awwam †

Strength
Unknown	Unknown	Unknown

Casualties and losses
Heavy	Heavy	Entire force decimated

The Overthrow of the Qarmatians was an armed uprising by the Seljuk and Abbasid supported Uyunids against the ruling Qarmatian state in Eastern Arabia. A local chief known as Abdullah bin Ali Al Uyuni aligned himself with the Abbasids and the Seljuk Empire, and started an uprising with their support. Due to support from more powerful foreign powers, the Uyunids successfully revolted and liberated Eastern Arabia, which significantly shifted the power dynamic in the region. Abdullah bin Ali Al Uyuni managed to establish the Uyunid Emirate, which pledged allegiance to the Abbasid Caliphate in Baghdad.

== Background ==
The Qarmatians were a radical Isma'ili group with major Zoroastrian influences that had established its power in the eastern Arabian Peninsula. The Qarmatians became known for their raiding of caravans going to pilgrimage to Mecca. The Uyunids were a local Arab dynasty coming from the tribe of Bani Abd al-Qays. The chief of the dynasty Abdullah bin Ali sought help from Seljuks and Abbasids to combat Qarmatian rule in Eastern Arabia.

=== Decline and the beginning of the Collapse of the Qarmatians ===
The majority of historians of this later period in Arabia's history agree that the political entities which emerged in the region were supported by influential tribal forces, the most significant of which was the Āmir branch of the Uqayl tribe. The Banū Uqayl were of northern Arab (Adnānī) descent, spreading from the Arabian Peninsula into Iraq and Bahrain. From them emerged several well-known branches, including Āmir, al-Muntafiq, Ubāda, and Khafāja.

In Bahrain, the Uqayli tribe settled alongside other tribes that had preceded them, such as Abd al-Qays and Banu Sulaym. They also allied with the Qarmatians of Bahrain and supported the da'wa of Abu Sa'id al-Jannabi when he appeared around 286 AH / 899 CE. The territory of Banū Uqayl extended across parts of the northern of Arabia, from Basra to Oman. Their main role, and source of livelihood, was to provide protection and safe-passage for trading caravans across the many trade routes in the region, in exchange for payments made by the authorities, local rulers, or merchants. For this reason, many political entities in the Gulf, including the Qarmatians, recognized this arrangement with Banū Āmir (Uqayl), as to reject it would expose security and stability to serious danger.

This phenomenon in itself clearly points to the weakness of the Qarmatians' political and military authority in Bahrain and the wider Gulf region. Historical accounts provide ample evidence of the Qarmatians' decline. In 378 AH / 988 CE, leader of the al-Muntafiq tribe, known as al-Aṣfar, defeated the Qarmatians in Al-Ahsa and Qatif, seizing their wealth and slaves. In 450 AH / 1068 CE, Abū al-Bahlūl al-Awwām ibn Muḥammad al-Zajjāj revolted against the Qarmatians, seized the island of Awal, and defeated the Qarmatian army and their allies from Banū Āmir and some of Abd al-Qays in a fierce naval battle.

== Arab tribal Uprisings against the Qarmatians ==
=== Abu al-Bahlul al-Awwam's revolt ===
Abu al-Bahlul al-Awwam was a leader of Bahrain that revolted against the Qarmatians, defeated their army, then crowned himself Emir of the island. Despite that he was unable to beat the new leader of Qatif, Yahya bin Abbas, and the island soon came under their control once more, killing Abu al-Bahlul in the process.

=== Uyunid revolt ===
The Uyunids under Abdullah bin Ali revolted against Qarmatian rule with Seljuk and Abbasid support. He quickly conquered Awal and Qatif, exiled its new ruler Yahya bin Al-Ayash and then invaded the Qarmatian stronghold of Hofuf. Seljuk and Uyunid forces marched down to Hofuf to take over the last part of land that was controlled by the Qarmatian state. They besieged the city for seven whole years, until it fell, the Qarmatian state fell with it, and the Uyunid Emirate was established, under the rule of Abdullah bin Ali.

=== Ayyashid Revolt ===
The situation wasn't stable afterwards due to internal conflicts within the āl-Ayash family. There was enmity between the ruler of Awal, Hassan bin Yahya and his brother Zakariya bin Yahya. Zakariya wished to annex Awal and go to war with the Uyunid Emirate while his brother Hassan wished to strengthen the relations between the families and was a vassal of Al Uyuni. Zakariya killed his brother due to his minister's influence. He began to march to Al-Ahsa and raided villages on his way.

Al Uyuni received the news of Zakariya's army and raised a large army to confront him in the village of Nadhirah, where Zakariya lost a large part of his army and was forced to retreat to Qatif, from where he was kicked out to Awal. Al Uyuni's son Al-Fadl prepared a large fleet to destroy the remnants of Zakariya's army. When Zakariya heard of this he fled to Uqair, where he was met in combat by Al-Uyuni's army and was killed and his army surrendered.

In 460 AH / 1078 CE, Yaḥyā ibn ʿAyyāsh, chief of Banū Muḥārib of Abd al-Qays, rose up against the Qarmatians, expelled their officials from Qatif, and extended his influence to the island of Awal.

=== Conflict with the Seljuks ===
After Al-Uyuni unified the country, he was faced with external conflicts with the Seljuks due to Al-Uyuni killing a Seljuk general in an instance of friendly fire. The Seljuk Sultan Malik-Shah I ordered the governor of Kerman to raise an army and confront the Uyunids in Al-Ahsa. Seeing a huge difference of numbers between their armies, Al-Uyuni submitted and pledged loyalty to the Seljuks in response and offered to help the Seljuks invade Oman, to minimize Seljuk influence in his emirate.

== Aftermath ==
The Qarmatian state was completely defeated after their expulsion from Hasa near the Arabian coast, by the chief of the tribe Banu Murra, who was known as ibn Amir.

In Bahrain and eastern Arabia, the Qarmatian state was replaced by the Uyunid dynasty. The Uyunids stabilized and rebuilt their state and expanded it. It is theorized that the populations of Qatif, and Al-Hasa accepted Twelver Shi'ism during their reign. The Uyunids reached their golden age under the rule of Abdullah bin Ali's son, Al-Fadl bin Abdullah. The Uyunids fell a while later to the Usfurids due to the poor rule of Mohammed bin Mas'ud. The Usfurids later fell to the Jarwanids of Qatif who later fell to the Jabrids.

== Sources ==
- Daftary, Farhad (1995). The Assassin Legends Myths of the Isma'ilis. Bloomsbury Academic. ISBN 978-1850439509.
- Omar, Farouk (2000). الوسيط في تاريخ الخليج العربي في العصر الاسلامي [An Intermediate History of the Arabian Gulf in the Islamic Period] (in Arabic). Dar Shorouq.
