= Battle of Malham and Sulaysil =

1077 conflict

- Part of Overthrow of the Qarmatians
Date	1077
Location	Between River Malham and River Sulaysil, Eastern Arabia
Result	Decisive Uyunid victory

Belligerents
Qarmatians: Banu Amir Rabi'a; Banu Awf; Azd; Qays; Banu Amir; 'A'idh; Qabath	Uyunid Emirate; Seljuk Empire

Commanders and leaders
Ahmad ibn Mus'ir; Abu Sa'id al-Qarmati †	Abdullah ibn Ali al-Uyuni; Al-Baqush

Strength
1000 cavalry A big number of infantry	600 cavalry (Ibn Muqrib's claim, implausibly low): 400 Uyunid horsemen; 200 Seljuk horsemen

Casualties and losses
Heavy	Unknwon

Battle of Malham and Sulaysil, was a conflict that took place in 1077 between the newly established Uyunid Emirate and the remnants of the Qarmatians and their supporters in Eastern Arabia.

== Background ==
Following his victory over the Qarmatians at the Battle of al-Rahlayn and the establishment of the Uyunid Emirate in al-Ahsa, Abdullah ibn Ali al-Uyuni focused on organizing and strengthening his state. He abolished the payments and gifts that the Qarmatians had previously provided to Arab tribes in exchange for securing trade routes and offering military support. Furthermore, he rejected a demand from the Banu 'Amir Rabi'a to continue receiving the financial payments they had formerly collected from the Qarmatians. Meanwhile, the remnants of the Qarmatians and their allies from various Yemeni tribes—who had remained in al-Ahsa after receiving assurances of safety from Abdullah al-Uyuni—took advantage of his preoccupation with subduing other tribes. They reached out to the Banu 'Amir Rabi'a, proposing an attack on al-Ahsa and pledging to join them in the assault.

In 1077, the Banu 'Amir Rabi'a—who contributed the largest contingent of troops—joined forces with the remnants of the Qarmatians, as well as other tribes that had either been affiliated with the Qarmatians or were hostile toward the Uyunids—namely the Azd, Qays Aylan, 'A'idh, and Qubath of the Banu 'Amir, along with the Banu 'Awf of the Banu 'Amir Rabi'a. Their force consisted of 1,000 cavalry and a great number of infantry, accompanied by a herd of wild, ferocious camels intended for use in the battle. Upon learning of this gathering, Abdullah al-Uyuni prepared his army and forces to confront them, joined by al-Baqush and a Seljuk military contingent.

== Battle ==
The opposing forces met between the Malham and Sulaysil rivers. Abdullah ibn Ali ordered his men to fire flaming arrows at the camels, while simultaneously commanding that horns be blown and drums beaten. This caused the camels to bolt and become agitated, which hindered the Qarmatian troops and threw them into disarray. Following this, the Uyunids and the Seljuks launched a decisive assault that brought an end to 'Amir Rabi‘a and his allies. During the battle, Abu Sa‘id al-Qarmati—one of the Qarmatian leaders—was killed; however, their primary leader, Ahmad ibn Mis‘ar, along with an individual named Abu Firas ibn al-Shabshab, managed to escape.

== Aftermath ==
The 'Amir Rabi'a tribe retreated into the desert. Abdullah al-Uyuni seized four hundred camels—along with their studs and herders—and captured the wives and children of the 'Amir Rabi'a; however, he did not allow the Seljuk Turks to take them, choosing instead to set them free and send them to Oman. As for Ahmad ibn Mis'ar and Abu Firas ibn al-Shabshab, they fled to Al-Hilla in Iraq, seeking refuge with the Banu al-Muntafiq. At this point, the tribes realized how difficult it would be to overthrow the Uyunids, given the firm entrenchment of their power. Following this battle, Abd Allah al-Uyuni discovered that the Qarmatians—whom he had previously granted security—had betrayed him; he subsequently moved to confront them, which led to the Second Battle of al-Khandaq.
