= Uyunid Emirate =

Dynasty

Uyunid Emirate الدَّوْلَةُ الْعُيُونِيَّة
- 1076–1238
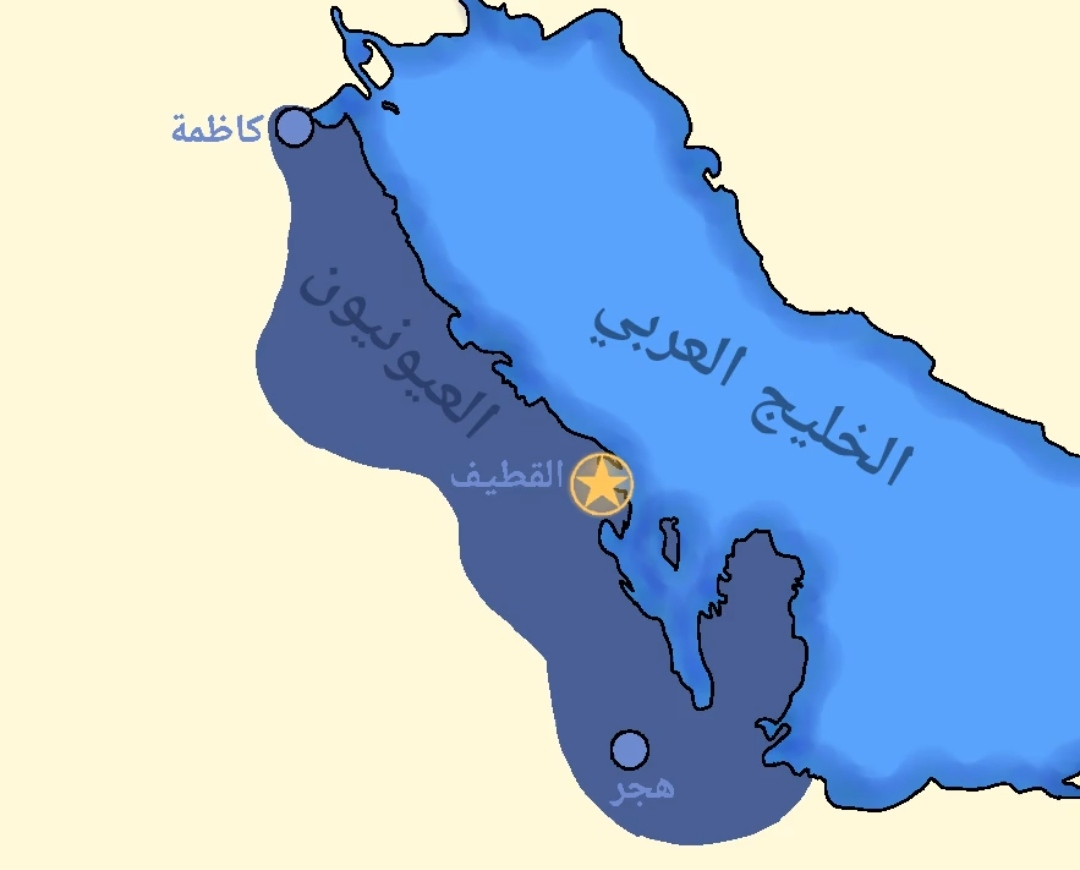
- The Uyunid emirate at its greatest extent.
- Capital: Al-Hasa
- Common languages: Arabic (Classical)
- Religion: Shia Islam
- Government: Monarchy
  - 1076 (first): Abdullah bin Ali
  - 1238 (last): Mohammed bin Mas'ud
- Historical era: 11th–13th centuries
  - Established: 1076
  - Disestablished: 1238
Preceded by	Succeeded by
Qarmatians; Ayyashid Emirate	Usfurids

The Uyunid Emirate (Arabic: الدَّوْلَةُ الْعُيُونِيَّة) was a historical Arab emirate centered in al-Hasa that ruled over most of eastern Arabia and Najd. The Uyunid dynasty, which belonged to the Banu Abd al-Qays tribe, ruled the emirate from 1076 until its power was weakened by the Salghurid invasion of 1235. The dynasty was ultimately displaced by the Usfurids, who seized control of Eastern Arabia in 1253. The emirate was established after the Uyunids took control from the Qarmatians.

== History ==
=== Background and Establishment ===
The Qarmatians began to weaken after the death of their military leader Al-Hasan al-A'sam in 977 (367 AH). The intervention of the Abbasids and the Fatimids in internal affairs led to the disintegration of the Qarmatian state. This weakness encouraged many Arab tribes to revolt against Qarmatian influence in Oman, southern Iraq, and Bahrain. These local tribal rebellions motivated some tribal chiefs, most notably Abdullah bin Ali Al Uyuni, to establish their own states in Al-Ahsa.

On the other side of Al-Ahsa, the Islamic East was in political disarray, particularly after the Buyids seized power in Baghdad from the Abbasids. However, this situation quickly changed with the emergence of the Seljuks on the eastern stage. Their influence extended to Transoxiana, Khorasan, Tabaristan, and Gorgan. The Buyids' control over Baghdad led to the Seljuk Sultan Tughril Beg entering Baghdad in 1055 (447 AH) and overthrowing the Buyids.

Local tribes had attempted to overthrow Qarmatian rule before the rise of Abdullah ibn Ali Al Uyuni. These tribes received military assistance from the Seljuks in Baghdad. Among them were the Banu al-Zajjaj, who, led by Abu al-Bahlul al-Awwam, established an emirate loyal to the Abbasid Caliphate on Awal Island. Al-Awwam had requested permission from the Qarmatians to build a mosque in Awal for 3,000 dinars. The Qarmatians agreed, but on the first Friday after its completion, Al-Awwam and his brother Muslim declared their rebellion and renounced allegiance to the Qarmatians. Not far from Awal, the Banu Ayash emerged in Qatif under the leadership of Yahya ibn Ayash. Yahya aspired to control all of Al-Ahsa and began planning to annex Awal, but he died before achieving his goal. He entrusted this task to his son Zakariya, who indeed succeeded in killing Al-Awwam, defeating his army, and incorporating Awal into his emirate. After the fall of Qarmatian influence in Awal and Qatif, only the city of Al-Ahsa remained, where they fortified themselves until their eventual downfall.

Abdullah ibn Ali Al Uyuni appeared in Al-Ahsa amidst the deteriorating conditions of the region and sought to rid it of the Qarmatians, having witnessed their weakened state. Abdullah relied entirely on his family and cousins from the Banu Abd al-Qays tribe, numbering approximately four hundred men. With this force, he began fighting the Qarmatians, gaining the support of the local population who resented Qarmatian rule. Abdullah laid siege to Al-Ahsa, a siege that lasted for nearly seven years. Despite financial aid from the Uyunid family, Abdullah found it difficult to eliminate Qarmatian influence, especially since opposing tribes did not join his military campaigns. Thus, Abdullah had no choice but to seek external assistance. In 1073 (465 AH) , he appealed to the Abbasid Caliphate in Baghdad, considering them a party harmed by Qarmatian attacks. The Abbasids and the de facto Seljuk Turkish rulers harbored animosity towards the Qarmatians, particularly the Seljuk Sultan Malik-Shah, who was known for his dislike of Ismaili Shi'ites. The Abbasid Caliphate saw Abdullah al-Uyuni's offer as a significant opportunity to restore Al-Ahsa to Abbasid rule.

In response to Abdullah al-Uyuni's request, the Seljuk Sultan dispatched a force of seven thousand men under the command of Artuk Bey in 1076 (469 AH). Aksuk Salar's army marched from Iraq to Al-Ahsa. En route to meet Abdullah al-Uyuni, they occupied Qatif and expelled its ruler, Ibn Ayash, to Awal Island. They then proceeded to Al-Ahsa and joined Abdullah al-Uyuni's army in besieging the Qarmatians. During the siege of Al-Ahsa, Artuk Bey and his soldiers plundered the surrounding farms, attacked local tribes, and seized their wealth, aiming to weaken the Qarmatians economically. The Qarmatians sought a month-long truce from Artuk Bey in exchange for money, offering thirteen men as hostages. Artuk Bey accepted, and the Qarmatians went out to gather food and supplies from their hidden caches. After collecting enough provisions, they returned to Al-Ahsa and renounced the truce with the Seljuk commander and his ally Abdullah al-Uyuni. Abdullah and the Seljuks then resumed a prolonged siege, during which the hostages were killed. With the onset of summer, which the Seljuks could not endure, Artuk Bey and his army withdrew from Al-Ahsa, leaving his brother, Al-Baqqush, with a small force to assist Abdullah al-Uyuni.

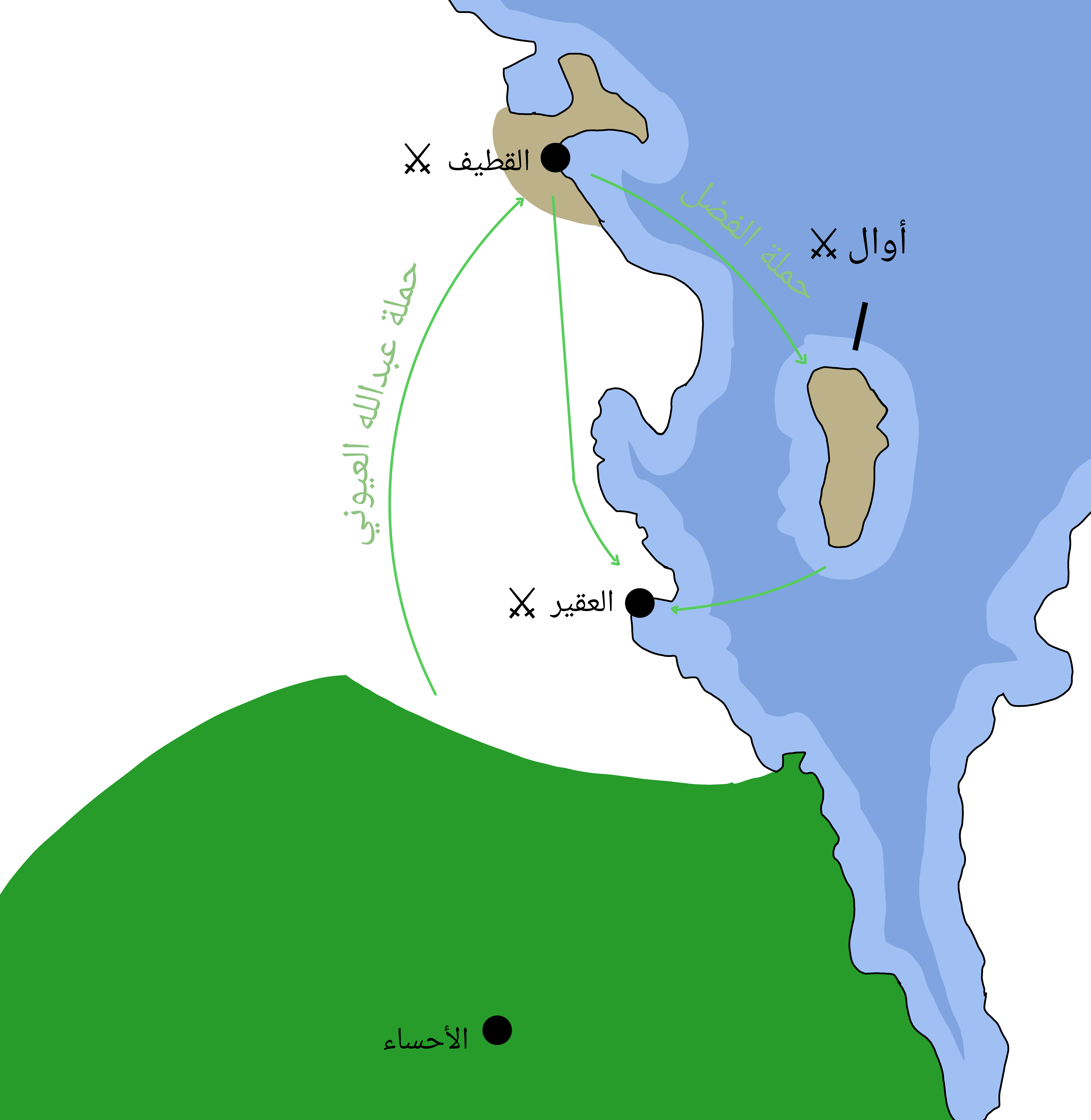
A map showing the march of the army of Abdullah al-Uyuni and his son Al-Fadl against the Emirate of Banu Ayash, starting with Abdullah's army marching to Qatif, then his son Al-Fadl being sent to Awal Island, and finally both armies marching to Uqair Port. : Uyunid political influence in Al-Ahsa. : Banu Ayash political influence in Qatif and Awal.

In their deteriorating situation, the Qarmatians decided to seek assistance from the Banu Amir of Rabiah to confront Abdullah al-Uyuni and his Seljuk ally Al-Baqqush. The Banu Amir appeared in a very large number compared to the Uyunid and Seljuk forces, with an estimated thirty thousand soldiers against six hundred. Despite this, Abdullah al-Uyuni, with Seljuk aid, managed to defeat the Qarmatians and Banu Amir in the Battle of al-Rahlin in 1076 (469 AH). He entered the Qarmatian palace in Al-Ahsa, announcing the fall of the Qarmatian state and the establishment of his own state in the Al-Ahsa region. Abdullah al-Uyuni prevented the Seljuks from entering the Qarmatian palace, fearing their interference in governance and their appropriation of the palace's wealth, which was supposed to belong to the Abbasid state. He sought to solidify his state's foundations and, to do so, needed to eliminate the Seljuks and Qarmatian supporters who posed a threat to his rule.

The Banu Amir fought Abdullah al-Uyuni after he refused their demand for the tributes they had received from the Qarmatians in exchange for their support and cessation of hostilities. Al-Uyuni defeated then moved north to a site between Qasr al-Khandaq and Bab al-Asfar to confront the Qarmatians, who had rebelled against his rule. The two sides clashed in the Battle of Bab al-Asfar in 1077 (470 AH), and Al-Uyuni emerged victorious, capturing a large number of them and expelling the rest to Oman due to their frequent treachery and broken covenants. The relationship between Abdullah al-Uyuni and the Seljuk commander in Al-Ahsa, Al-Baqqush, worsened due to Al-Baqqush's ambition to increase Seljuk influence in Al-Ahsa and Abdullah al-Uyuni's adoption of the Fatimid doctrine to spread his Alawite call. This led to escalating problems between the two commanders, culminating in Abdullah al-Uyuni killing Al-Baqqush. The Abbasid Caliphate and the Seljuk Sultanate quickly prepared an army led by Rukn al-Din upon hearing of Al-Baqqush's death. Rukn al-Din's army reached Al-Ahsa and besieged it for approximately a year until the Seljuk soldiers grew weary. Abdullah al-Uyuni then confronted and defeated them, forcing their retreat from Al-Ahsa.

The internal situation of the Banu Ayash in Qatif and Awal was unstable due to the animosity between Al-Hasan ibn Yahya Al Ayash, the ruler of Awal, and his brother Zakariya, the ruler of Qatif. Zakariya aspired to overthrow his brother's rule in Awal and then advance to Al-Ahsa to incorporate it into his domain. He resented his brother Al-Hasan's attempts to strengthen ties with the Uyunids and, on the advice of his vizier Al-Akroot, plotted to kill his brother. Zakariya indeed killed his brother, expanding his influence in Awal. He then prepared an army to march on Al-Ahsa, reaching a village called Nazira, where he began plundering its farms and surrounding villages. News of the plundering reached Abdullah al-Uyuni, who mobilized an army from his family and cousins from the Banu Abd al-Qays and marched towards Nazira. A battle ensued between the two parties, resulting in Zakariya's defeat and retreat to Qatif. Abdullah pursued Zakariya's forces to Qatif and managed to seize it. Zakariya then fled to Awal, so Abdullah dispatched an army and ships under the command of his son Al-Fadl to Awal Island. His army met Zakariya's army, and Al-Fadl was victorious, forcing Zakariya to flee to Uqair, where he encountered Abdullah ibn Ali's army. Abdullah managed to kill Zakariya in 1077 (470 AH), thereby unifying most of Al-Ahsa under his rule. He appointed his son Al-Fadl as emir of Qatif, and his son Ali over Awal Island, making Al-Ahsa the capital of the country.

Although Abdullah al-Uyuni unified Al-Ahsa under his banner, he faced external interference from the Seljuks. The Seljuk Sultan Malik-Shah had not forgotten Al-Baqqush's murder by Abdullah al-Uyuni and sought revenge and the overthrow of his rule. He ordered Hussain Omer, the ruler of Kerman, to prepare a military campaign against Al-Ahsa. Hussain carried out the order, heading to Al-Ahsa to bring it under Seljuk influence in 1081 CE (474 AH). Upon the Seljuk army's arrival, Abdullah al-Uyuni realized he could not confront such a large force with his smaller army. Therefore, he demonstrated his loyalty and submission to the Seljuk Sultanate and the Abbasid Caliphate to protect his and the Uyunids' possessions. Abdullah sought to eliminate Seljuk influence around Al-Ahsa and thus encouraged the Seljuk princes to invade Oman. The Seljuk princes were convinced, especially after Al-Uyuni's display of loyalty, allowing Al-Uyuni to secure his dominion from the Seljuks.

=== Stability ===
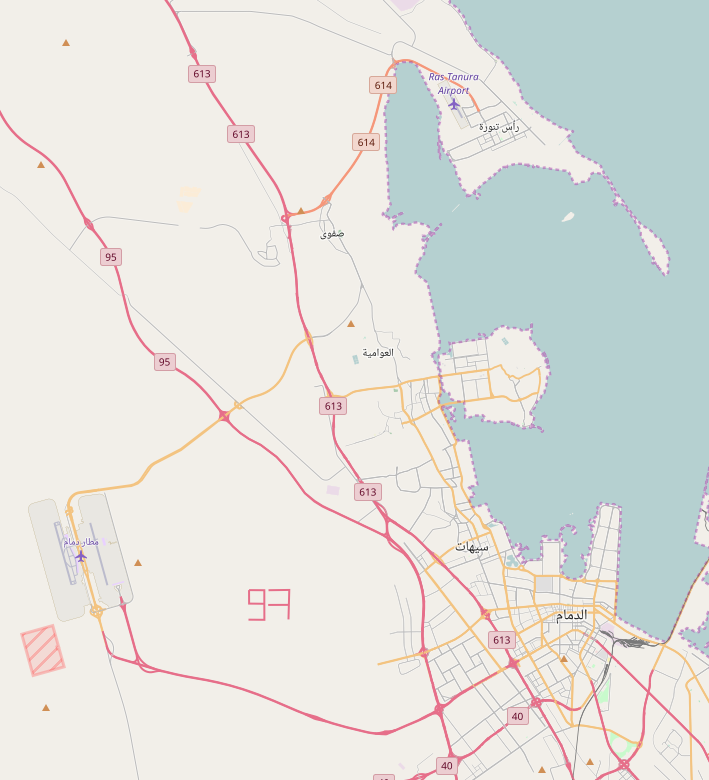
A geographical map of Qatif, which the Uyunids adopted as the capital during the reign of Muhammad ibn al-Fadl.

After the stabilization of conditions, Abdullah al-Uyuni began to organize administrative affairs. He appointed his sons over Qatif and Awal, and Sultan ibn Dawud over the northern areas between Basra and Al-Ahsa. These regional emirs did not possess absolute authority and reported back to Abdullah al-Uyuni. He also stabilized the country's economic situation, which led to secure trade routes for merchants and pilgrims, free from Bedouin attacks. Furthermore, he regulated religious affairs by removing Qarmatian beliefs, building mosques, and establishing religious schools with a Seljuk architectural style that adhered to Shi'ite principles. Abdullah successfully improved his relationship with the Abbasid Caliphate, to whom he pledged allegiance, and sermons in mosques were delivered in the name of the Abbasid Caliph. Consequently, both the Abbasid Caliphate and the Seljuk Sultanate recognized Emir Abdullah al-Uyuni as the ruler of Al-Ahsa.

Al-Fadl ruled Al-Ahsa after his father, and there are many accounts regarding his reign. Some suggest he was only the ruler of Qatif and Awal during his father's time and did not rule the entire country, which is supported by historian Abdulrahman Al-Mudairees's opinion on the succession of Muhammad ibn al-Fadl. Others believe he ruled the entire country after his father's death, an opinion shared by researcher Abdulrahman Al-Mulla. The last opinion states that he was appointed ruler by his father when his father felt unable to manage affairs, an view supported by researcher Muhammad Mahmoud Khalil. Al-Fadl's rule was characterized by the protection of the land and the vulnerable, and he governed with firmness and strength. He revitalized the country's economic life by protecting merchants' goods from highway robbers, which encouraged people to engage in agriculture and trade.

It is also noted that Al-Fadl frequently moved within his lands, not settling in one place, and often resided in the desert north of the country. One day, Al-Fadl settled on Tarout Island and was assassinated there by one of his servants in 1126 (520 AH).

Muhammad ibn al-Fadl assumed rule after his father's death and relocated the capital from Al-Ahsa to Qatif. He removed his uncles, Al-Hasan and Ali, from governing Awal and Al-Ahsa, appointing Shukr ibn Ali over Al-Ahsa and Ghurair ibn al-Fadl over Awal. This angered his uncles, who awaited an opportune moment to eliminate Muhammad. To achieve this, they incited the Banu Amir and their leader Ghufayla ibn Shabana to fight Muhammad ibn al-Fadl in Qatif. Ghufayla and his forces marched towards Qatif, and the Uyunid army, led by Muhammad ibn al-Fadl, moved towards Ghufayla's camp. This resulted in the defeat of the Uyunid army and Muhammad's retreat to Qatif. Muhammad ibn al-Fadl suspected his uncles, Al-Hasan and Ali, played a role in this conflict, especially since Ghufayla and his army headed towards Al-Ahsa after the battle; and they were welcomed by Emir Shukr, Al-Hasan, and Ali. Consequently, Muhammad ibn al-Fadl accused his uncles of conspiring against him with Ghufayla and prepared an army to confront them in Al-Ahsa in 1143 (538 AH). His uncles met him, and a battle ensued between the two sides, ending with the death of Emir Muhammad ibn al-Fadl and his brother Ja'far. Despite these conflicts during Muhammad ibn al-Fadl's reign, his era was distinguished by literary and poetic gatherings, and the emir was fond of poetry and poets, generously honoring those who visited him from literary circles.

=== Expansion ===
Under Muhammad b. Ahmad b. Abu'l-Hussin b. Abu Sinan, the territory of the Uyunid Emirate extended from Najd to the Syrian desert. Because of the influence of the Uyunid Emirate, Caliph al-Nasir li-Din Allah gave Muhammad b. Ahmad the authority to protect the pilgrimage route to Mecca. However, Muhammad was later assassinated by a family member at the instigation of his cousin, Gharir b. Shukr b. Ali. From 587 to 605, H. Mohammed bin Abi Al-Hussain united Qatif and Al-Hasa.

=== Decline ===
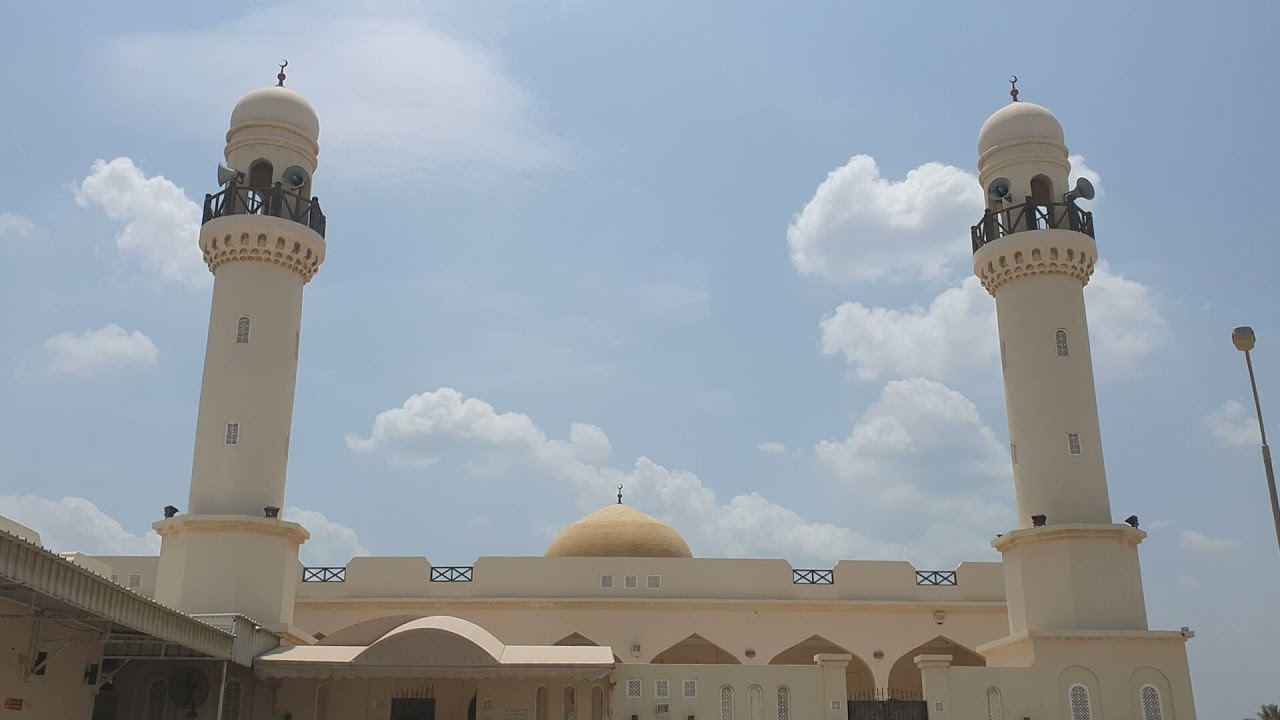
A picture of Sheikh Subsib Mosque, the mosque where Ali ibn al-Hasan al-Uyuni was assassinated, leading to a series of assassinations of members of the Uyunid dynasty that continued until the reign of Shukr ibn Mansur al-Uyuni.

The assassination of Emir Muhammad ibn al-Fadl marked a dangerous turning point in the history of the Uyunid state, which fragmented into three separate entities. In Al-Ahsa, power rested with Emir Ali ibn Abdullah al-Uyuni. Qatif was controlled by Muhammad's brother, Ghurair ibn al-Fadl, while Awal Island was under the rule of Al-Hasan ibn Abdullah al-Uyuni. Ghurair ibn al-Fadl attempted to repair Qatif's affairs after the damage sustained during Muhammad's conflicts with his uncles. He also prepared to avenge his brother Muhammad's death at the hands of their uncles. Ghurair marched his army to Al-Ahsa, where they encountered Ali's army near Al-Ahsa, at a location called Al-Sulaymat. Ghurair managed to inflict a defeat on Ali's army, forcing Ali's forces to retreat and fortify themselves in Al-Ahsa. Ghurair and his army, meanwhile, plundered Al-Ahsa's farms before retreating to Qatif after the battle. It appears Ghurair was content with this victory, having achieved his desire for revenge for his brother's murder. Ghurair's rule did not last long; he died in 1144 (539 AH), or was possibly killed by one of his nephew Muhammad's sons. The sources do not mention the name of the emir who succeeded him, but he also did not rule for long due to his young age and poor administration. The ruler of Awal, Al-Hasan ibn Ali al-Uyuni, exploited this emir's weakness and Qatif's instability, leading him to seize Qatif. Thus, the rule of the Al-Fadl ibn Abdullah Al Uyuni family in Al-Ahsa ended, succeeded by the sons of Ali ibn Abdullah al-Uyuni in Al-Ahsa and the sons of Al-Hasan ibn Abdullah al-Uyuni in Qatif and Awal.

==== Qatif ====
In 1144 after Al-Hasan seized Qatif, the ruler of Qays Island, Bakirzarz ibn Sa'd, attacked Awal with a large army. This attack was driven by economic ambitions and an exploitation of the political turmoil within the Uyunid family. Al-Hasan dispatched an army from Qatif, led by his nephew Shukr ibn Ali, to Awal to confront Bakirzarz. The two armies met on Sitrah Island, where Shukr emerged victorious, and Bakirzarz and his forces retreated to Qays Island. Al-Hasan made Qatif his capital, and although Al-Ahsa remained under his brother Ali's rule, sources indicate that Ali and his sons nominally pledged allegiance to Al-Hasan. Thus, most of Al-Ahsa region came under Al-Hasan's control. Qatif flourished under his reign in terms of livelihood, politics, and trade, becoming a magnet for the inhabitants of the Al-Ahsa region. Indeed, most of the Uyunid state officials and Al-Hasan's household left Al-Ahsa and moved to Qatif. Al-Hasan died in 1154 (549 AH), leaving behind a political vacuum. His sons were young and none could assume leadership, which facilitated the ambitions of those seeking power.

Ghurair ibn Mansour al-Uyuni was one of these ambitious individuals who seized the opportunity to take power. During his reign, Awal was attacked by the ruler of Qays in 1154 (549 AH), who occupied it for a short period, plundered it, and then withdrew. Ghurair ruled for seven years until he was killed by his cousin Hajras ibn Muhammad al-Uyuni in 1160 (556 AH). Hajras seized power but did not rule for long, dying in 1161 CE (557 AH). Sources mention that his rule was weak, and the country was unstable during his time. Shukr ibn al-Hasan al-Uyuni assumed power after Hajras's death. Shukr attempted to stabilize his state, aided by his brothers. During his reign, the ruler of Qays tried to attack Awal but failed. After Shukr's death in 1179 (575 AH), Ali ibn al-Hasan al-Uyuni took over. Ali's rule was brief, as he was killed by his brother Al-Zayr ibn al-Hasan al-Uyuni in Subsib Mosque in 1179. After Ali's death, infighting and assassinations among the Uyunid family members in Qatif and Awal for power intensified. These assassinations led to the people of Qatif's dissatisfaction with the Uyunid family, as they grew tired of their conflicts. Therefore, they appointed an emir from outside the Uyunid family, but he did not remain in power for long, resigning and leaving it to another member of the Uyunid family.

==== Al-Ahsa ====
This tumultuous period in the Uyunid state's history did not affect Al-Ahsa as it did Qatif. The Uyunid emirs in Al-Ahsa were more stable than those in Qatif and Awal. Al-Ahsa suffered an economic crisis during the reign of Shukr ibn Ali Al Uyuni due to the plundering of its farms and crops by Ghurair ibn al-Fadl's soldiers. To resolve this crisis, Shukr promptly opened the state treasury and distributed grains and seeds to the people. Sources mention his excessive generosity, even providing grains for birds so they would not starve due to scarcity. Emir Shukr was subject to the authority of his uncle Al-Hasan ibn Abdullah in Qatif, as evidenced by Shukr's participation in one of the Qays ruler's battles in Awal, alongside his uncle Al-Hasan and under his command. After Shukr's death in 1160 (556 AH), Muhammad ibn Mansur al-Uyuni assumed rule of Al-Ahsa. He was described as strong, firm, and decisive, and his reign was known for security and stability in Al-Ahsa, where he halted Bedouin incursions against the city's inhabitants. Ibn al-Muqarrab's diwan recounts his strength, stating that the enemies of the Uyunid family in Al-Ahsa gathered with their sheikh, Shabana ibn Ghufayla, inciting him to fight Muhammad ibn Mansur. However, he refused due to the Uyunid's strength and urged them to be patient until Muhammad's death. Because of this incident, the tribes were unable to attack Al-Ahsa during Muhammad ibn Mansur al-Uyuni's reign. He died in 1184 (580 AH).

== Geography ==
The region known as Bahrain, located in the eastern part of the Arabian Peninsula, included the southern area of Basra along the coast of the Persian Gulf. It also included the territories of Kuwait, al-Hasa, Qatif, Qatar, and the Awal Islands, now known as Bahrain, the United Arab Emirates, and Oman. The territory of the Uyunid Emirate extended from Najd to the Syrian desert. Through the influence of the Uyunid Emirate and the decree of Caliph al-Nasir li-Din Allah, Muhammad b. Ahmad was given the authority to secure the pilgrimage route to Mecca.

The Uyunid dynasty was an Arab dynasty that ruled the Uyunid Emirate for nearly 200 years, from the 11th to the 13th centuries. They were the remnants of the Bani Abdul Qays tribe and seized control of the country from the Qarmatians between 1077 and 1078 with the military assistance of the Seljuk Empire.

== Economy ==
The economy of the Uyunids was based on pearl diving, which was its main economic activity, along with trade routes.

== Demographics ==
=== Language ===
The Uyunid dynasty is believed to have been the last state in which the population spoke classical Arabic.

=== Religion ===
The Uyunid sect claims that they were Shi'ites. According to Nakash, the populations of Bahrain, Hasa, and Qatif may have converted to Twelver Shi'ism during this period.

== Culture ==
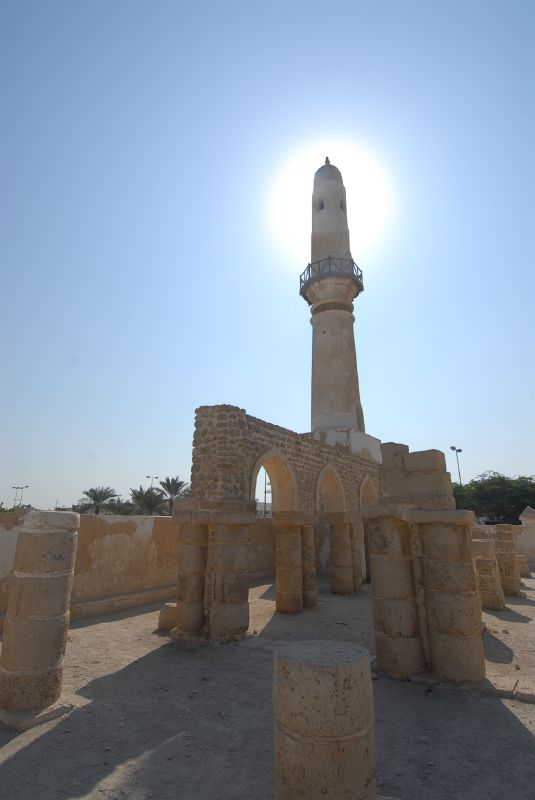
The Khamis Mosque, one of earliest Islamic architecture in Bahrain

=== Literature ===
Ali bin al-Mugrab al-Uyuni was a poet from al-Hasa who died in 630 AH (1232 AD). He was one of the last known poets who specialized in hair systems and was eloquent among the people of the Arabian Peninsula before the modern era. Al-Uyuni's lineage can be traced back to Abdul Qays, who ruled Ahsa during that period after it was liberated from the Qarmatians. Al-Uyuni was a poet and his works, along with his explanations, are considered one of the most important sources in the history of this state.

=== Architecture ===
The Khamis Mosque is considered to be the first mosque in Bahrain, built during the reign of the Umayyad Caliph Umar II. According to Al Wasat journalist Kassim Hussain, other sources suggest that it was built later, during the reign of the Uyunids, with one minaret. The second minaret was added two centuries later, during the reign of the Usfurids. The identical twin minarets of this ancient Islamic monument make it easy to spot when driving along Shaikh Salman Road in Khamis.

The Khamis Mosque is believed to be one of the oldest in the region, with some sources claiming that it was founded in 692 AD. However, an inscription found on the site suggests that it was actually founded sometime in the 11th century. The mosque underwent two reconstructions in the 14th and 15th centuries, during which the minarets were added. Recently, the Khamis Mosque has been partially restored.

== See also ==
- Qatif
- Bahrain
- List of Muslim empires and dynasties
