= Ali bin al Mugrab Al Uyuni =

Bahraini poet

- Born: Ali bin al Mugrab Al Uyuni; Al-Hasa, Eastern Arabia
- Died: 1232 AD (630 AH)
- Occupation: Poet
- Writing career
- Language: Arabic
- Period: Medieval

Ali bin al-Mugrab Al Uyuni (علي بن المقرب العيوني) was a Bahrani poet from Al-Hasa, who died in 630 AH or 1232 AD, one of the late known poets among the people of the Arabian Peninsula before the modern era. His lineage is traced to Al Uyuni, descending from Abdul Qays, who ruled Ahsa in that period after seizing it from the Qarmatians. Al Uyuni poet, and is considered his office and explanations which are attached by one of the most important sources on the history of that state.

This has been achieved by his several times of poetry, by a number of researchers, including Ahmed Musa al-Khatib and new investigations and explanation. by three researchers (Abdul-Khaliq al-Janabi, Abdul Ghani Alarafat, and Ali Bey).

== See also ==
- Rabi'ah
- Uyunid dynasty
