= Abu'l-Walid Muslim =

11th-century Bahraini political leader

Muslim bin Mohammad bin Yusuf Al-Zajaj (Arabic: مسلم بن محمد بن يوسف الزَجاج), known as Abu al-Waleed, was one of the two leaders of the 1058 Bahraini revolution; the other being his brother Al-Awwam.
