= Artuk Bey =

Seljuk military commander

Zaheer-ul-Daulah Artuk Beg

Governor of Jerusalem
- In office 1085–1091
- Succeeded by: Ilghazi and Sökmen

Personal details
- Born: unknown
- Died: 1091 Jerusalem, Seljuk Empire

Military service
- Allegiance: Seljuk Empire
- Rank: General
- Battles/wars: Battle of Manzikert (1071); Conquest of Amid (1085); Battle of Ain Salm (1086); Siege of Aleppo (1086)

Zaheer-ul-Daulah Artuk Beg, known as Artuk Bey, was a Turkish commander of the Seljuk Empire in the 11th century, chief of the Oghuz tribe of Döğer, and eponymous founder of the Artuqid dynasty. His father's name was Eksük. He was the Seljuk governor of Jerusalem between 1085–1091. Although the Artuqid dynasty was named after him, actually the dynasty was founded by his sons Sökmen and Ilghazi after his death. He was also father to Alp-Yaruq, Bahram, Abd al-Jabar, and three other sons.

== In Anatolia ==
Artuk Bey was one of the commanders of the Great Seljuk Empire army during the Battle of Manzikert in 1071. After the battle, he took part in the conquest of Anatolia on behalf of the Seljuk Empire. He captured the Yeşilırmak (Ancient Greek: Ἶρις) valley in 1074. In 1075, Artuk captured on behalf of the Byzantine Empire the Norman rebel Roussel de Bailleul and handed him over to the future emperor Alexios Komnenos. He also served the sultan by quashing a rebellion in 1077.

His next mission was a campaign in 1086 to capture Diyarbakır (Amid) from the Marwanids. In this campaign he quarreled with the commander-in-chief Fakhr al-Dawla ibn Jahir who tended to make peace with Marwanids. In a surprise attack he defeated reinforcements to Marwanids. However, when the sultan Malik Shah I heard about the event he accused Artuk.

== In Syria ==
Artuk left the battle field and attended to Tutush I who was Malik Shah's discordant younger brother in Syria in 1084. In 1086 he was instrumental in defeating Suleiman ibn Qutulmish, the sultan of Seljuks of Rûm in the battle of Ain Salm between Süleyman and Tutush.

== In Jerusalem ==
Tutush granted him al-Quds (Jerusalem) as an iqta and Artuk was governor there until his death in 1091. His grave is in a tomb next to his khanqah near the Gate of al-Dawadariya, known as Gate of King Faisal today.

== In Eastern Arabia ==
In 1076, Artuk Bey led a campaign to support the Uyunids against the Qarmatians, he sacked Basra and captured Qatif then besieged Ahsa (modern-day Hofuf). After accepting a truce for a month, Artuq was betrayed by the Qarmatians who brought supplies and then entered the city and closed the gates, thus breakin the truce. So Artuk continued the siege, but the summer came, and his army grew weary of the siege due to the heat and disease, so Artuk retreated back to Baghdad, leaving 200 men led by his brother al-Baghush to support Abdullah al-Uyuni.

== In popular culture ==
In the Turkish TV series, Diriliş: Ertuğrul, he is portrayed as a close companion of Ertuğrul by the Turkish actor, Ayberk Pekcan. This is anachronistic as Ertuğrul died in 1280 and their live spans most likely did not overlapped.

== Sources ==
- Ibn al-Athir (2002). The Annals of the Saljuq Turks. Translated by Richards, D.S. Routledge.
- Yücel, Yaşar; Sevim, Ali (1990). Türkiye Tarihi Cilt I. Ankara: AKDTYK Yayınları.
