= Tylos =

Greek exonym for Bahrain

Tylos (Ancient Greek: Τύλος) was the Greek exonym of ancient Bahrain in the classical era, during which the island was a center of maritime trade and pearling in the Erythraean Sea. The name Tylos is thought to be a Hellenisation of the Semitic Tilmun (from Dilmun). From the 6th to 3rd century BC Bahrain was part of the Persian Empire. After the conquest of Persia by Alexander the Great, his admiral Nearchus led an expedition which discovered the island, and serving under Nearchus was Androsthenes of Thasos, who left an extensive account of the island in Periplus of India, the source of many subsequent writers, including the contemporary botanist Theophrastus, who states that the island was a rich source of cotton and timber.

== History ==
The Greek geographer Strabo mentions islands in Persian Gulf named Tyre and Arad (Muharraq) and the local legend that they are the metropoleis of Phoenicians. Herodotus also reports the Tyrian tradition that Phoenicians originated in the Persian Gulf, and theory that the same pair of cities Tyros/Tylos and Arad in both Phoenicia and Persian Gulf may suggest colonization from one way or another has been much discussed. However, there is little evidence of occupation at all in Bahrain during the time when such migration had supposedly taken place.

It is not known whether Bahrain was part of the Seleucid Empire, although the archaeological site at Qalat Al Bahrain has been proposed as a Seleucid base in the Persian Gulf. During this period, Tylos was very much part of the Hellenised world: while Aramaic was in everyday use, the language of the upper classes was Greek. Local coinage shows a seated Zeus, who may have been worshiped there as a syncretised form of the Arabian sun-god Shams. Tylos also held Greek athletic contests.

With the waning of Seleucid power, Tylos passed under the control of Mesene, the kingdom founded in what today is Kuwait by Hyspaosines in 129 BC, which ruled the island until second century AD. A building inscription found in Bahrain indicates that Hyspoasines appointed a strategos to rule the islands. Another king of Mesene Meredates (r. 130–151 AD) from the Parthian dynasty is also mentioned by an inscription to have Tylos governed by a satrap.

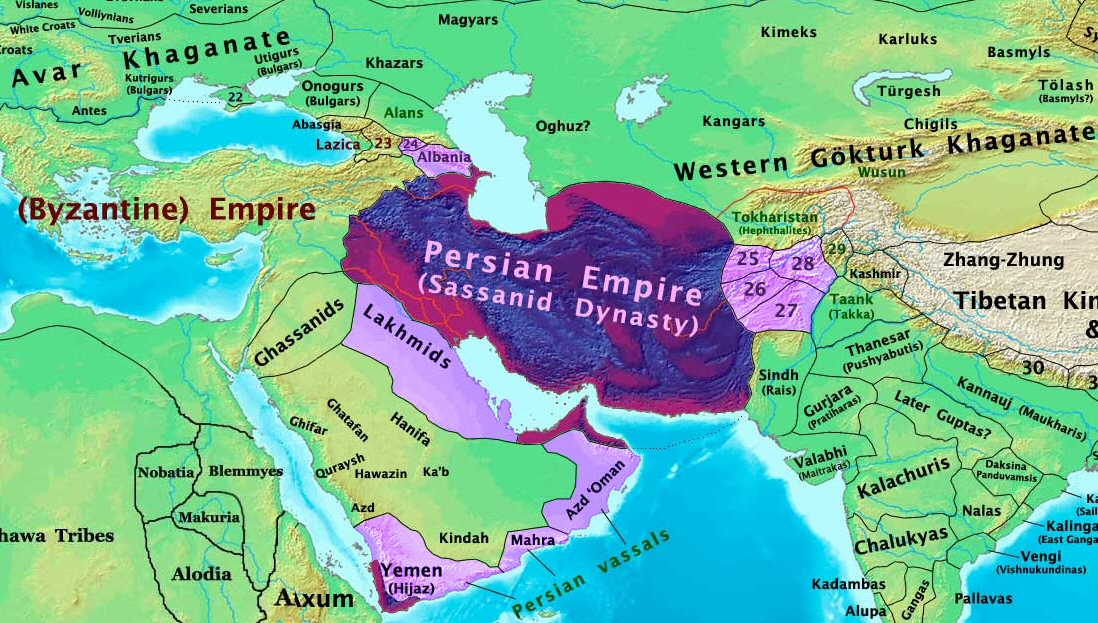
Asia in 600 CE, showing the Sassanid Empire before the Arab conquest.

In the third century AD, the Sassanids succeeded the Parthians as the suzerain of Mesene. Ardashir, the first ruler of the Sassanian dynasty conquered the area and give the kingdom to his son. Likewise, the son of Shapur I was crowned the king of Mesene. At some point Mesene ceased to be a sub-kingdom, and Bahrain was incorporated into the Sassanid province of Mazon covering the Persian Gulf's southern shore.

By the fifth century Bahrain was a centre for Nestorian Christianity, with Samahij having an episcopal see. In 410, according to the Oriental Syriac Church synodal records, a bishop named Batai was excommunicated from the church in Bahrain. It was also the site of worship of a shark deity called Awal. Worshipers reputedly built a large statue to Awal in Muharraq, although it has now been lost, and for many centuries after Tylos, the islands of Bahrain were known as Awal.
