= Abdullah ibn Ali al-Uyuni =

Uyunid Emirate founder/ruler from 1074 to 1107

Abdullah Al Uyuni عَبْد اللَّه الْعُيُونِي

Uyunid Emirate
- Reign: 1076 – 1126
- Successor: Muhammad al-Uyuni
- Born: Abdullah Al Uyuni; Al Oyun, Qarmatians
- Died: 1126 (Almost 80 years); Al-Ahsa Oasis, Uyunid Emirate
- Issue: Boys: al-Fadl bin Abdullah Al-ayouni Ali bin Abdullah Al-ayouni; Al-Hassan bin Abdullah Al-ayouni; Muqidid bin Abdullah Al-ayouni; Abu Musaib bin Abdullah Al-ayouni; Majid bin Abdullah Al-ayouni; Masoud bin Abdullah al-ayouni Dabar bin Abdullah Al-ayouni; Girls: Heba bint Abdullah Al-ayouni and five others (names unknown)
- House: Uyunid Emirate

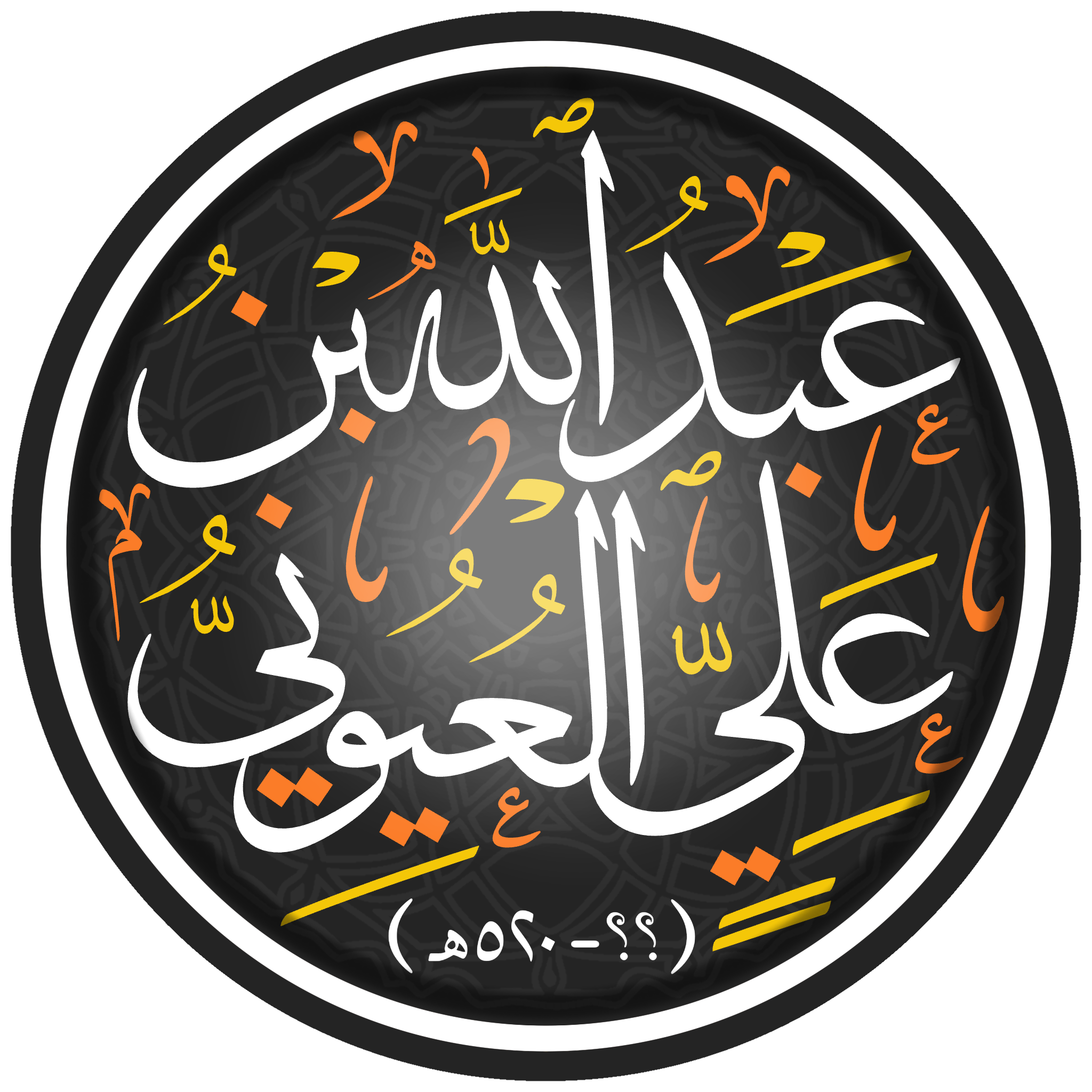
Calligraphic rendering of the name of Prince Abdullah bin Ali al-Uyuni in Thuluth script.

Abdullah bin Ali bin Muhammad bin Ibrahim bin Muhammad Al-Marri Al-Abdi Al Uyuni (Arabic: الشَّيْخُ الْأَمِيرُ عَبْدُ اللَّهِ بْنُ عَلِيِّ بْنِ عَبْدِ اللَّهِ بْنِ عَلِيِّ بْنِ عَبْدِ اللَّهِ بْنِ مُحَمَّدِ بْنِ إِبْرَاهِيمَ بْنِ مُحَمَّدٍ الْمُرِّيُّ الْعَبْدِيُّ الرَّبِعِيُّ الْعُيُونِيُّ) was the founder and Emir of the Uyunid Emirate ruling from 1074 to 1107. He succeeded in removing the Qarmatians from Eastern Arabia.

== Lineage and dynastic etymology ==
Al Uyuni was a descendant from the Banu Abdul Qays tribe, although it is unclear from which branch. Some sources indicate the Al-Marri as a Marra bin Amer bin al-Harith bin Anmar bin Amr bin Wadia ’bin Lakiz bin Afsa bin Abdul Qays, but Abu al-Faraj al-Isfahani spoke of a prince named Abu Senan Muhammad bin al-Fadl bin Abdullah bin Ali Al-Abdi Al-Marri. The Uyunid rulers were also named Al Ibrahim after Al Uyuni’s great-grandfather. Since the tribe once lived in the village of Al Oyun in the Al-Ahsa Oasis, the family was named after it, that is, Al Uyuni. The Abdul Qays tribe stemmed from Rabi'a ibn Nizar, the ancestor of the Eastern Arabian tribes and son of Nizar ibn Ma'ad.

== Founding the state ==
=== Revolt Against the Qarmatians ===
Political, social and economic conditions in the Qarmatian state had reached a critical point when Al Uyuni began his revolt. He struggled at first in his skirmishes with the authorities given that he started with only around 400 supporters from the Abdul Qays, but other tribes took advantage of the weakened authority and eventually joined in. Al Uyuni’s troops forced the Qarmatians to withdraw to the Al-Ahsa Oasis while the loyal tribes withdrew to the Syrian Desert, culminating in a seven-year war of attrition and a siege of the Qarmatian capital at Qatif.

=== End of the Qarmatians ===
The final overthrow of the Qarmatians started with the revolt of Abu al-Bahlul al-Awwam, but the deathblow was struck once Al Uyuni petitioned the Abbasid caliph Al-Qa'im and the Seljuk Emperor Malik-Shah I (represented by his vizier Nizam al-Mulk) for reinforcements in 1072 or 1073. Malik-Shah was the more receptive of the two sovereigns in his eagerness for suzerainty over Al-Ahsa and to avenge his general Kajkina’s defeat at the hands of the Qarmatian troops of Yahya ibn Ayyash. Therefore, the Turkmen commander, Axsek Salar, was dispatched from the Seljuk capital of Baghdad to Al-Ahsa, from where he marched through Basra to Qatif. Salar looted Qatif and confiscated the treasury of Ibn Ayyash (who had fled to Awal Island, now Bahrain). Afterwards, the Seljuks assisted Al Uyuni’s siege of Al-Ahsa, ultimately leaving 200 soldiers to garrison it. Finally in 1078, at what was called the “Battle of the Two Rivers,” the Qarmatians and their Banu Amir allies were routed and surrendered.

=== Restoring Qatif ===
After the retreat of the Seljuk army, however, Ibn Ayyash recaptured Qatif, but he was rebuffed by Al Uyuni, who proceeded to occupy Bahrain. Finally killing Ibn Ayyash in battle, Al Uyuni has united Eastern Arabia and Bahrain into one state, the Uyunid Emirate, based in Al-Ahsa.

== Royal dynasty ==
- Uyunid dynasty

== See also ==
- Al-Hasa
- Qatif
- Bahrain
- List of Muslim empires and dynasties
