= Abu al-Bahlul al-Awwam =

11th-century Bahraini political leader

Al-Awwam bin Mohammad bin Yusuf Al-Zajaj (Arabic: العوام بن محمد بن يوسف الزَجاج), known as Abu al-Bahlul (Arabic: ابو البهلول، Father of Al-Bahlul) was a Shiite member of the Abdul Qays tribe in Bahrain who overthrew Ismaili Qarmatian rule of the islands around 1058.

He was the founder of Al-Awamiyah, a village in the Qatif region which was named after him.

== Biography ==
Abu al-Bahlul was the guarantor of the Qarmatian governor in Bahrain, Jaafar bin Abi Muhammad bin Arham. Abu al-Bahlul had a brother named Abu'l-Walid Muslim who was a member of the island's ulama. Since there was no mosque on the island, then called Awal, Abu al-Bahlul paid the Qarmatians 3,000 dinars to erect one to serve the non-Arabs and merchants who would otherwise be reluctant to visit the island. As a result, the site was chosen to be close to the souk. Abu al-Walid dedicated the khutba (opening prayer) to Caliph Al-Qa'im as required by the Shi’ite Buyid dynasty then controlling the Caliphate. At first the Qarmatians agreed to the mosque being built, in exchange for his donation, acknowledging that the majority on the island were not Qarmatians. After the 1058 revolt of Al-Basasiri, however, the Baghdad sermons were redirected to the name of Al-Mustansir Billah, the Fatimid Caliph in Cairo. When the Qarmatians asked Abu’l-Walid to implement this change, Abu al-Bahlul made it clear that the donations obligated his brother to do no such thing.

=== Revolt ===
Tensions quickly arose between Abu al-Bahlul and bin Arham. The Qarmatians based in Baghdad then decided to remove bin Arham and replaced him with a new governor tasked to reassert his authority by arresting Abu al-Bahlul and his supporters. Abu al-Bahlul and his supporters hired an Abdul Qays leader, Abu al-Qasim ibn Abu al-Aryan, who proceeded to recruit around 30,000 men who surprised the new governor and rapidly took control of the island in 1058. Upon receiving word of events on Bahrain, the Qarmatian vizier Abu Abdullah ibn Sanbar sent some of his sons to Oman to get weapons and raise reinforcements, but Abu al-Bahlul and Abu al-Aryan ambushed the party and killed all 40, taking the 5,000 dinars and 3,000 spears as booty. The Qarmatians then offered Abu al-Aryan rule of Bahrain in 1066 in exchange for him arresting Abu al-Bahlul. Aware of the plot, Abu al-Bahlul killed Abu al-Aryan while he was at Abu Zaidan spring, in what is now Bilal Al Qadeem. The Qarmatians, thinking they would enter without resistance, invaded and were promptly ambushed and disarmed, leaving Abu al-Bahlul in firm control and Abu’l-Walid as the new vizier of Bahrain. Abu al-Bahlul's succes propmted others to rebell as well, one of them was Yahya ibn Ayash who revolted in al-Qatif, and later invaded Bahrain, defeating Abu al-Bahlul and killing him.

== See also ==
- History of Bahrain
