= Uyunid dynasty =

Arab dynasty from 1076 to 1253

Uyunid Dynasty
- Parent house: Abdul Qays
- Country: Uyunid Emirate
- Founded: 1076
- Founder: Abdullah bin Ali Al Uyuni
- Final ruler: Fadl III ibn Muhammad
- Titles: Emir, Sheikh
- Dissolution: 1253
- Cadet branches: Al Ghardaqa

The Uyunid dynasty (Arabic: العيونيون, romanized: al-ʿUyūnīyūn) were an Arab dynasty that ruled Eastern Arabia for 163 years, from the 11th to the 13th centuries. They were, like the majority of the people of Eastern Arabia, from the Banu Abdul Qays tribe. They seized the country from the Qarmatians with the military assistance of Great Seljuq Empire in the year 1077–1078 CE. It then fell to the Usfurids of Banu Uqayl in 651 AH (1253 CE). The famous poet Ali bin al Mugrab Al Uyuni is a Uyunid.

== History ==
=== Rise ===
In 1077–1078, an Arab sheikh named Abdullah bin Ali Al Uyuni defeated the Qarmatians in Bahrain and al-Hasa in the Siege of Hofuf with the help of the Seljuq Turks of Baghdad and founded the Uyunid dynasty.

Then Al-Fadhl, son of Abdullah, transferred his capital to Qatif, then to Awal (today’s state of Bahrain). In his reign, the state extended to Kuwait. Then in 513 AH, the capital went back to Qatif. In 531 AH, Mohammed, son of Al Fadhl I, was assassinated, and his state was divided into two, one in al-Hasa and the other in Qatif.

=== Expansion ===
Under Muhammad b. Ahmad b. Abu'l-Hussin b. Abu Sinan, the Uyunids' territory stretched from Najd to the Syrian desert. Due to the influence of the Uyunid kingdom, Caliph al-Nasir li-Din Allah gave Muhammad b. Ahmad authority to protect the pilgrimage route to Mecca. Muhammad was later murdered by a family member, instigated by his cousin, Gharir b. Shukr b. Ali. In the years 587 – 605 AH, Mohammed bin Abi al-Hussain united Qatif and Al-Hasa. He restored the glory of the Uyunids, and extended the state to Najd in central Arabia. The state was divided again after his assassination in 605 H.

== Religion ==
The Uyunids were Muslim, sources mention they were Shia. According to Nakash, the populations of Bahrain, Hasa, and Qatif, may have accepted Twelver Shi'ism during this period. A study by Nayef al-Shera'an stated they were Shia based on their coins, which he said were exhibited at the British Museum. The study also mentions that no reliable sources support that they were Sunni. On the other hand, Iraqi Sunni historian Safa Khulusi said they were Sunni, shortly before stating he had a "strong feeling" that poet Ali bin al Mugrab Al Uyuni was a Zaydi Shia.

== See also ==
- Abdul Qays
- History of Bahrain
- History of Saudi Arabia
- List of Muslim empires and dynasties
