= Awal =

Ancient name of Bahrain

Awal (Arabic: أوال) is an ancient name of Bahrain, an island country in the Arabian peninsula. The name Awal had remained in use, probably for eight centuries. Awal Premi was derived from the name of a god that used to be worshiped by the inhabitants of the islands before the advent of Islam. Awal resembled the head of an ox. As for the meaning of this name, there are ʼawwal 'first, first part, previous'; ʼawwalan 'firstly, at first'; ʼawwalī 'prime, primordial, original'.

A representation of Awal

Before Islam, Bahrain's administrative name was Mishmahig and it was also called Tylos by the Ancient Greeks. If the name Tylos is related to ṭiwal 'rope with which the feet of draught-cattle are tied together', then the cattle representation of this deity may be thus confirmed.

== See also ==
- History of Bahrain
- Munzir ibn Sawa Al Tamimi
