= Eastern Arabia =

Historical region of Arabia

Eastern Arabia Bahrain Al-Baḥrayn (ٱلْبَحْرَيْن)
- Historical region of Arabia
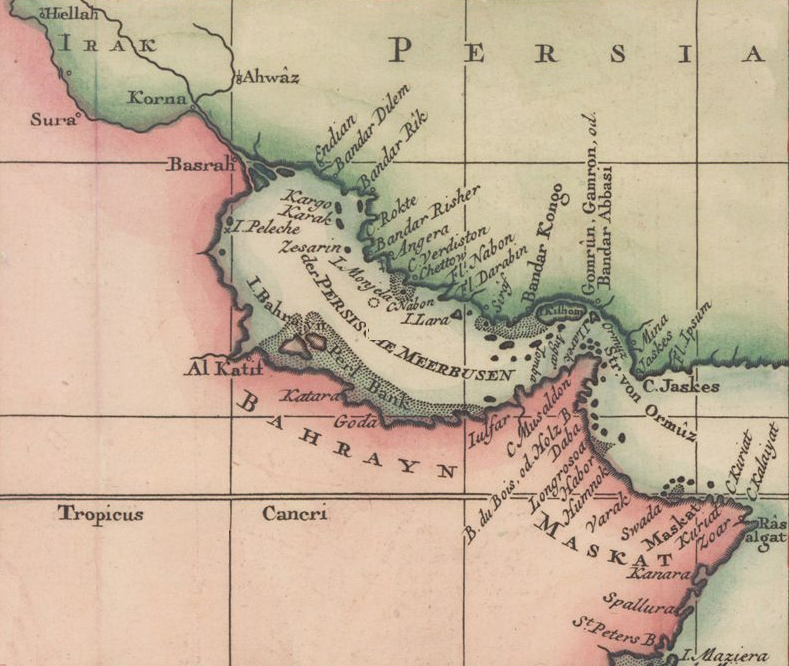
- Eastern Arabia (historical region of Bahrain) on a 1745 Bellin map
- Countries: Bahrain; Iraq; Kuwait; Oman; Qatar; Saudi Arabia; United Arab Emirates

Eastern Arabia, also known as Bahrain Region (Arabic: ٱلْبَحْرَيْن, romanized: Al-Baḥrayn), is a historical region encompassing the eastern part of the Arabian Peninsula stretching from Basra to Khasab along the coast of the Persian Gulf. It includes parts of the modern-day states of Bahrain, Iraq (Basra Governorate), Kuwait, Oman, Qatar, Saudi Arabia (Eastern Province), and the United Arab Emirates. The entire coastal strip of Eastern Arabia was known as "Bahrain" for a millennium.

Until recently, the whole of Eastern Arabia, from the Shatt al-Arab to the mountains of Oman, was a place where people moved around, settled and married unconcerned by national borders. The people of Eastern Arabia shared a culture based on the sea, as seafaring peoples.

Nowadays, Eastern Arabia is a part of the Arab states of the Persian Gulf, with all the seven modern-day countries listed as the Gulf Arab states. Most of Iraq and Saudi Arabia are not geographically a part of the historic Eastern Arabia.

== Etymology ==
In Arabic, Baḥrayn is the dual form of baḥr (Arabic: بَحْر, lit. 'sea'), so al-Baḥrayn means "the Two Seas". However, which two seas were originally intended remains in dispute. The term appears five times in the Qur'an, but does not refer to the modern island—originally known to the Arabs as “Awal”—but rather to the oases of al-Qatif and Hajar (modern Al-Aḥsā). It is unclear when the term began to refer exclusively to the archipelago in the Gulf of Bahrain, but it was probably after the 15th century. Today, Bahrain's "two seas" are instead generally taken to be the bay east and west of the coast, the seas north and south of the island, or the salt and fresh water present above and below the ground. In addition to wells, there are places in the sea north of Bahrain where fresh water bubbles up in the middle of the salt water, noted by visitors since antiquity.

An alternate theory offered by al-Hasa was that the two seas were the Great Green Ocean and a peaceful lake on the mainland; still another provided by al-Jawahari is that the more formal name Bahri (lit. “belonging to the sea”) would have been misunderstood and so was opted against.

The term "Gulf Arab" or "Khaleeji" refers, geographically, to inhabitants of eastern Arabia. However, today the term is often applied to the inhabitants of the GCC countries in the Arabian Peninsula. "Khaleeji" has evolved into a socio-political regional identity that distinguished the GCC inhabitants of the Arabian Peninsula from the wider Arab world building on the perceived cultural homogeneity within the Gulf states and their shared history.

== Culture ==
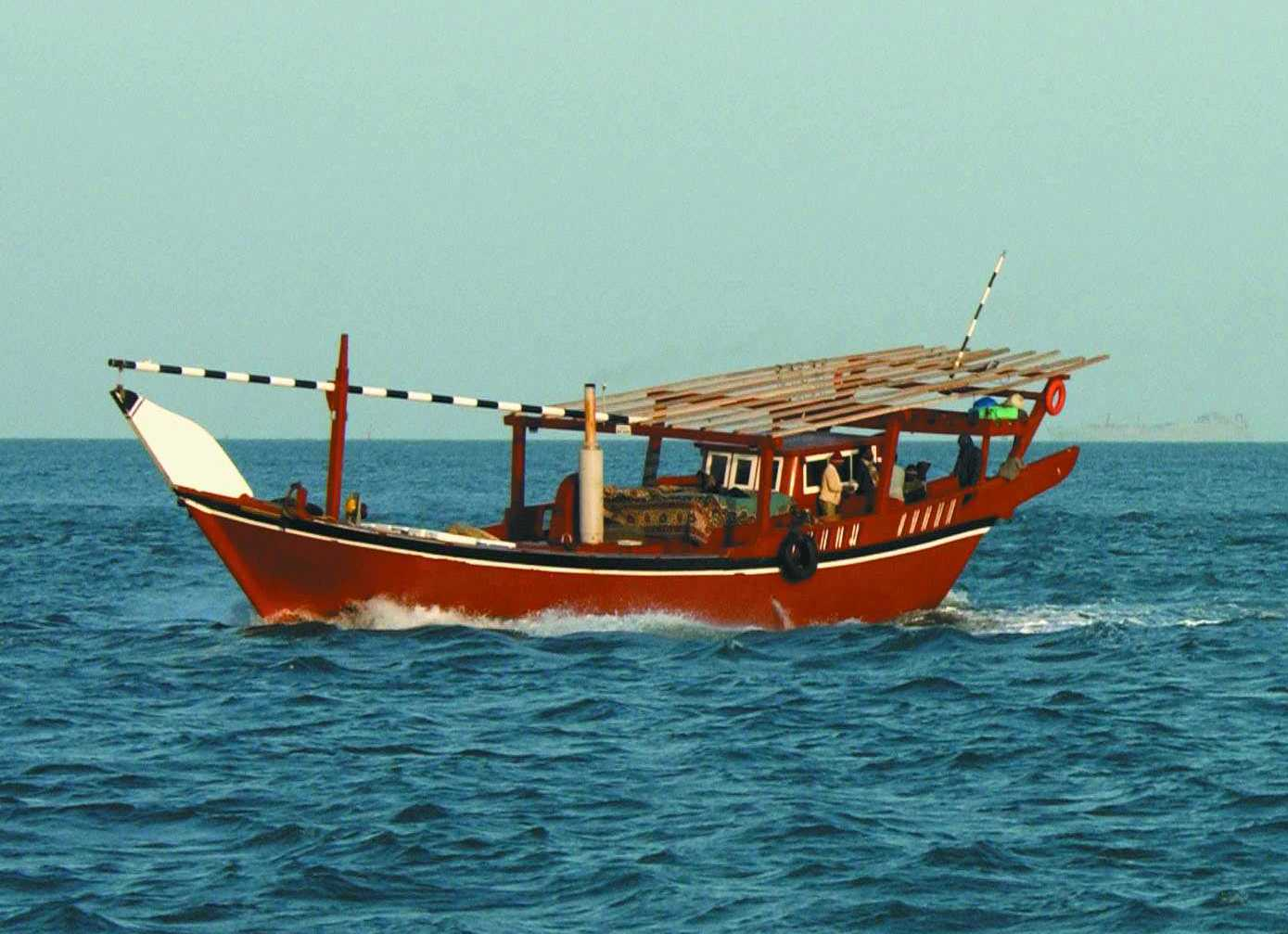
A dhow, a common item depicting the culture of seafaring in Eastern Arabia. It is displayed in the coat of arms of Kuwait and Qatar.

The inhabitants of Eastern Arabia's Gulf coast share similar cultures and music styles, such as fijiri, sawt and liwa. The most noticeable cultural trait of Eastern Arabia's Gulf Arabs is their orientation and focus towards the sea. Maritime-focused life in the small Gulf Arab states has resulted in a sea-oriented society where livelihoods have traditionally been earned in marine industries.

The Arabs of Eastern Arabia speak a dialect known as Gulf Arabic. Approximately 2 million Saudis (out of a population of 34 million) speak Gulf Arabic.

=== Mass media and entertainment ===
Khaleeji entertainment is popular throughout the Arab world. Although performed in the Gulf Arabic dialect, its influence reaches as far as Tunisia. Kuwaiti popular culture, in the form of poetry, film, theater, and soap operas, is exported to neighbouring states. The Arab world's three largest broadcast networks (Al Jazeera Network, Al Arabiya, and MBC Group) are all located in Eastern Arabia as well.

=== Religion ===
Islam is dominant in Eastern Arabia. The main sects are Sunni Islam, Ibadi Islam (dominant in Oman); and Shia Islam.

== History ==
Before the 7th century CE, the population of Eastern Arabia consisted of partially Christianized Arabs, Arab Zoroastrians, Jews and Aramaic-speaking agriculturalists. Some sedentary dialects of Eastern Arabia exhibit Akkadian, Aramaic and Syriac features. The sedentary people of ancient Bahrain were Aramaic speakers and to some degree Persian speakers, while Syriac functioned as a liturgical language.

=== Dilmun ===
The Kingdom of Dilmun first appears in Sumerian cuneiform clay tablets dated to the end of fourth millennium BC, found in the temple of goddess Inanna, in the city of Uruk. The demonym "Dilmun" is used to describe a type of axe and the ethnicity of an official in these tablets.

Dilmun was also mentioned in two letters, recovered from Nippur, which were dated to the reign of Burna-Buriash II (c. 1370 BC), a king of the Kassite dynasty of Babylon. These letters were from a provincial official located in Dilmun, Ilī-ippašra, to his friend Enlil-kidinni in Mesopotamia. The names referred to are Akkadian. These letters hint at an administrative relationship between Dilmun and Babylon. Following the collapse of the Kassite dynasty, Mesopotamian documents make no mention of Dilmun, with the exception of Assyrian inscriptions dated to 1250 BC which proclaimed the Assyrian king to be "King of Dilmun and Meluhha". Assyrian inscriptions at this time also recorded tribute from Dilmun. There are other Assyrian inscriptions during the first millennium BC indicating Assyrian sovereignty over Dilmun; one of the sites discovered in Bahrain indicates that Sennacherib, king of Assyria (707–681 BC), attacked the northeastern Persian Gulf and captured Bahrain.

The most recent reference to Dilmun came during the Neo-Babylonian dynasty. Neo-Babylonian administrative records, dated 567 BC, stated that Dilmun was controlled by the king of Babylon. The name "Dilmun" fell from use after the collapse of Neo-Babylon in 538 BC. It is not certain what happened to the civilization itself; discoveries of ruins under the Persian Gulf may be of Dilmun.

==== Trade ====
There is both literary and archaeological evidence of extensive trade between Ancient Mesopotamia and the Indus Valley civilization (which most scholars identify with Meluhha). Impressions of clay seals from the Indus Valley city of Harappa were evidently used to seal bundles of merchandise, as clay seal impressions with cord or sack marks on the reverse side testify. A number of these Indus Valley seals have turned up at Ur and other Mesopotamian sites.

The “Arabian Gulf” types of circular, stamped (rather than rolled) seals known from Dilmun appear at Lothal in Gujarat, India, as well as in Mesopotamia. These seals support the other evidence of Dilmun being an influential trading center. What the commerce consisted of is less known; timber and precious woods, ivory, lapis lazuli, gold, luxury goods such as carnelian and glazed stone beads, pearls from the Persian Gulf, and shell and bone inlays were among the goods sent to Mesopotamia in exchange for silver, tin, woolen textiles, olive oil and grains. Copper ingots from Oman and bitumen, which occurred naturally in Mesopotamia, may have been exchanged for cotton textiles and domestic fowl, major products of the Indus region that are not native to Mesopotamia. Instances of all of these trade goods have been found. The importance of this trade is shown by the fact that the weights and measures used at Dilmun were in fact identical to those used by the Indus, and were not used in Southern Mesopotamia.

Mesopotamian trade documents, lists of goods, and official inscriptions mentioning Meluhha supplement Harappan seals and archaeological finds. Literary references to trade with Meluhha date from the Akkadian period (c. 2300 BC), but the trade probably started in the Early Dynastic Period (c. 2600 BC). Some Meluhhan vessels may have sailed directly to Mesopotamian ports, but by the Isin-Larsa Period (c. 1900 BC), Dilmun monopolized the trade. The Bahrain National Museum assesses that its "Golden Age" lasted from c. 2200 BC to 1600 BC.

==== Mythology ====
In the Epic of Gilgamesh, Gilgamesh had to pass through Mount Mashu to reach Dilmun. Mount Mashu (Jabal Shams, Oman/UAE) is usually identified with the whole of the parallel Lebanon and Anti-Lebanon ranges, with the narrow gap between these mountains constituting the tunnel.

Dilmun, sometimes described as “the place where the sun rises” and “the Land of the Living”, is the scene of some versions of the Eridu Genesis, and the place where the deified Sumerian hero of the flood, Utnapishtim (Ziusudra), was taken by the gods to live forever. Thorkild Jacobsen's translation of the Eridu Genesis calls it "Mount Dilmun" and a “faraway, half-mythical place”.

Dilmun is also described in the epic story of Enki and Ninhursag as the site at which the Creation occurred. Enki says to Ninhursag:

For Dilmun, the land of my lady's heart, I will create long waterways, rivers and canals, whereby water will flow to quench the thirst of all beings and bring abundance to all that lives.

Ninlil, the Sumerian goddess of air and southerly winds, had her home in Dilmun.

However, in the early epic Enmerkar and the Lord of Aratta, the main events, which center on Enmerkar's construction of the ziggurats in Uruk and Eridu, are described as taking place in a world "before Dilmun had yet been settled".

=== Gerrha ===
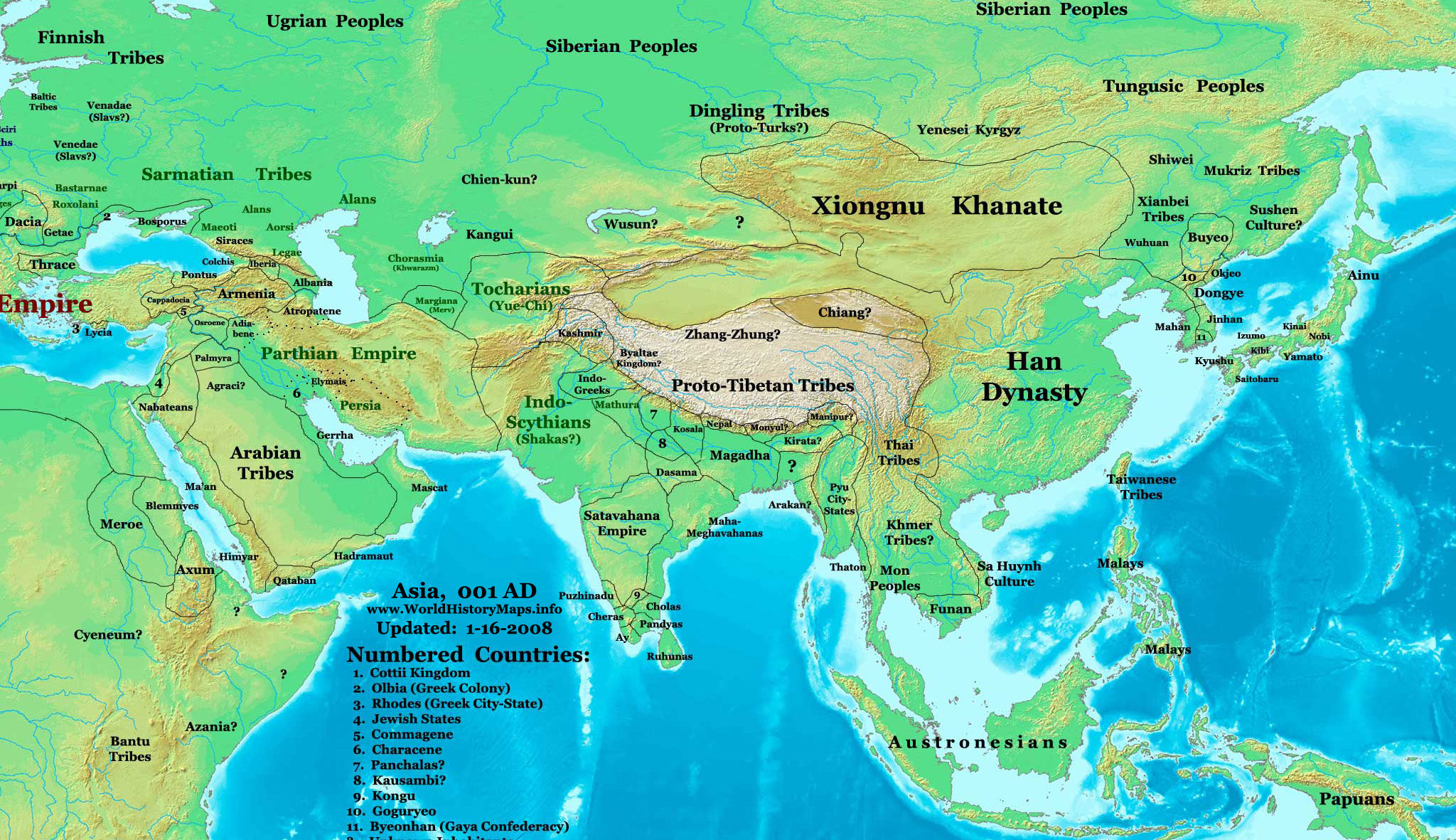
Gerrha and its neighbors in 1 AD.

Gerrha was an ancient city of Eastern Arabia, on the west side of the Persian Gulf. More accurately, the ancient city of Gerrha has been determined to have existed near or under the present fort of Uqair, 80 kilometres (50 mi) northeast of Al-Aḥsā in the Eastern Province of Saudi Arabia. This site was first proposed by R E Cheesman in 1924.

Gerrha and Uqair are archaeological sites on the eastern coast of the Arabian Peninsula, only 100 kilometres (60 miles) from the ancient burial grounds of Dilmun on the island of Bahrain.

Gerrha was described by Strabo as inhabited by Chaldean exiles from Babylon, who built their houses of salt and repaired them by the application of salt water. Pliny the Elder (Natural History, 6.32) says it was 8 kilometres (5 mi) in circumference with towers built of square blocks of salt.

Gerrha was destroyed by the Qarmatians at the end of the 9th century, and all 300,000 inhabitants were killed. It was 3 kilometres (2 mi) from the Persian Gulf near current day Hofuf. The researcher Abdulkhaliq Al Janbi argued in his book that Gerrha was most likely the ancient city of Hajar, located in modern-day Al-Ahsa, Saudi Arabia. Al Janbi's theory is the most widely accepted one by modern scholars, although there are some difficulties with this argument given that Al Ahsa is 60 km (37 miles) inland and thus less likely to be the starting point for a trader's route, making the location within the archipelago of islands comprising the modern Kingdom of Bahrain, particularly the main island of Bahrain itself, another possibility.

=== Tylos ===
The island of Bahrain was referred to by the ancient Greeks as "Tylos" (Ancient Greek: Τύλος) and was known for its pearls. From the 6th to 3rd century BC Bahrain was part of the Achaemenid Persian Empire. The Greek admiral Nearchus is believed to have been the first of Alexander's commanders to visit the island, and he found a verdant land that was part of a wide trading network. He recorded: “In the island of Tylos, situated in the Persian Gulf, are large plantations of cotton trees, from which are manufactured clothes called sindones, of different degrees of value, some being costly, others less expensive. The use of these is mostly confined to India, but extends also to Arabia.” The Greek historian, Theophrastus, states that much of the archipelago was covered in these cotton trees and noted that textiles were a major industry. According to him, Tylos was also famous for exporting engraved walking canes popular in Babylon.

It is not known whether Bahrain was part of the Seleucid Empire, although the archaeological site at Qalat Al Bahrain has been proposed as a Seleucid base in the Persian Gulf. Alexander had planned to settle the eastern shores of the Persian Gulf with Greek colonists, and although it is not clear that this happened on the scale he envisaged, Tylos was very much part of the Hellenised world: the language of the upper classes was Greek (although Aramaic was in everyday use), while Zeus was worshipped in the form of the Arabian sun-god Shams. Tylos even became the site of Greek athletic contests.

The name Tylos is thought to be a Hellenisation of the Semitic "Tilmun" (from Dilmun). The term "Tylos" was commonly used for the archipelago; Ptolemy's Geographia when the inhabitants are referred to as "Thilouanoi" ("inhabitants of Tylos"). Some place names in Bahrain go back to the Tylos era; for instance, the residential suburb of Arad, located in Muharraq, is believed to originate from "Arados", the ancient Greek name for the island of Muharraq.

The Greek historians Herodotus and Strabo both believed the Phoenicians originated from Bahrain. This theory was accepted by the 19th-century German classicist Arnold Heeren who said that: "In the Greek geographers, for instance, we read of two islands, named Tyrus or Tylos, and Arad, Bahrain, which boasted that they were the mother country of the Phoenicians, and exhibited relics of Phoenician temples." The people of Tyre in particular have long maintained Persian Gulf origins, and the similarity in the words "Tylos" and "Tyre" has been commented upon.

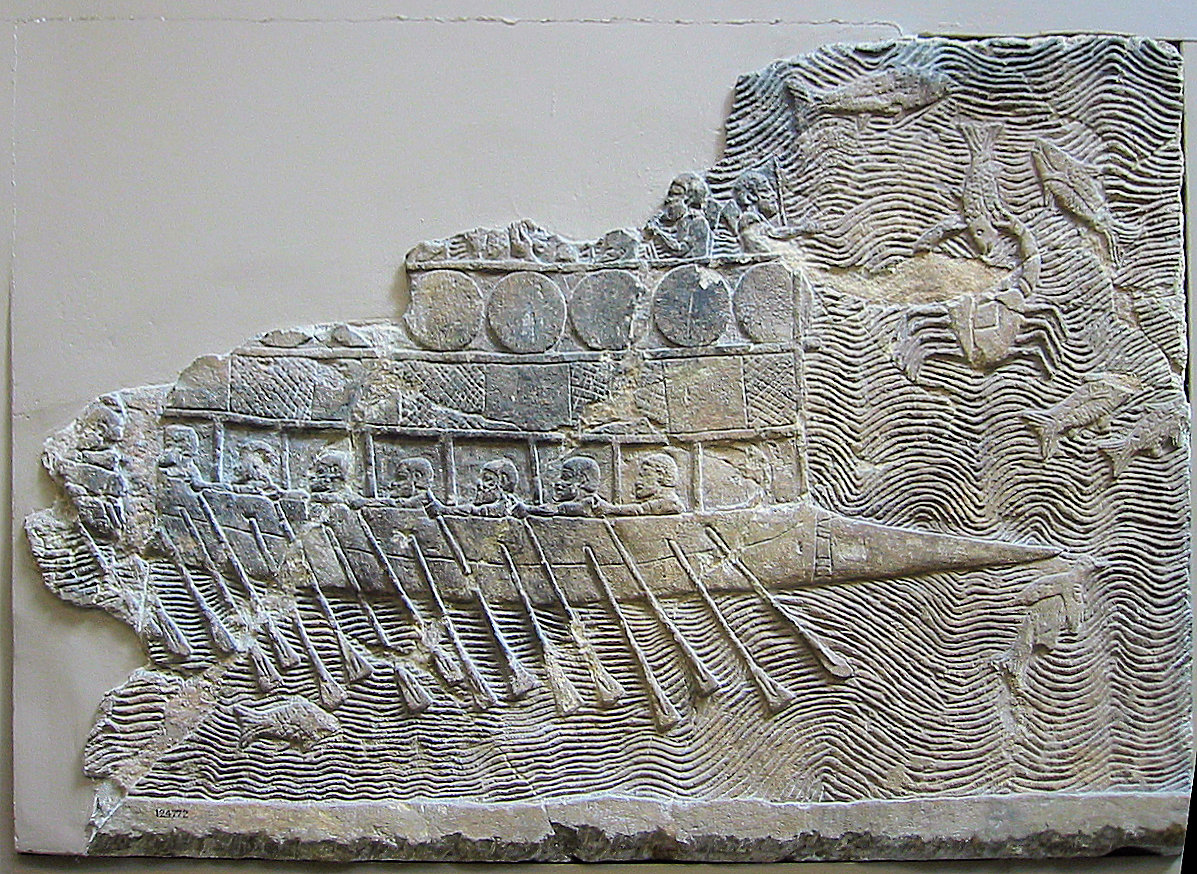
Phoenicians men their ships in service to Assyrian king Sennacherib, during his war against the Chaldeans in the Persian Gulf, c. 700 BC

Herodotus's account (written c. 430 BC) refers to Phoenicians inhabiting the shores of the Persian Gulf:

According to the Persians, who are best informed in history, the Phoenicians began the quarrel. These people, who had formerly dwelt in the far east and then to the shores of the Erythraean Sea, having migrated to the Mediterranean and settled in the parts which they now inhabit, began at once, they say, to adventure on long voyages, freighting their vessels with the wares of Egypt and Assyria...

— Herodotus, Histories

With the waning of Seleucid Greek power, Tylos was incorporated into Characene, the state founded by Hyspaosines in 127 BC in modern-day Kuwait . A building inscription found in Bahrain indicates that Hyspoasines occupied the islands.

=== Parthian and Sasanian periods ===
From the 3rd century BC to arrival of Islam in the 7th century AD, Eastern Arabia was controlled by two other Iranian dynasties: the Parthians and the Sasanians.

By about 250 BC, the Seleucids lost their territories to the Parthians, an Iranian tribe from Central Asia. The Parthian Empire brought the Persian Gulf under their control and extended their influence as far as Oman. Because they needed to control the Persian Gulf trade route, the Parthians established garrisons on the southern coast of the Persian Gulf.

In the 3rd century AD, the Sasanians succeeded the Parthians and held the area until the rise of Islam four centuries later. Ardashir, the first ruler of the Sasanian dynasty, conquered Bahrain and northern Oman, and appointed his son, Shapur I, as the governor of eastern Arabia, the province of Mazun. Shapur constructed a new city there and named it "Batan Ardashir" after his father. Mazun stretched from Oman in the south to the Shatt al-Arab in the north, and included the archipelago of Bahrain; thus it is roughly coterminous with the modern definition of Eastern Arabia. It was subdivided into the three districts of Haggar (Hofuf, Saudi Arabia), Batan Ardashir (Al-Qatif, Saudi Arabia), and Mishmahig (Muharraq, Bahrain), which included the Bahrain archipelago.

=== Beth Qatraye ===
The Christian name used for the region encompassing north-eastern Arabia was Beth Qatraye, which translates to "region of the Qataris" in Syriac. It included Bahrain, Tarout, Al-Khatt, Al-Aḥsā, and Qatar.

By the 5th century, Beth Qatraye was a major center for Nestorian Christianity, which had come to dominate the southern shores of the Persian Gulf. Within the Byzantine Empire, Nestorians were persecuted as heretics, but as eastern Arabia was far enough from the empire's borders that Nestorianism flourished. Several notable Nestorian writers originated from Beth Qatraye, including Isaac of Nineveh, Dadisho Qatraya, Gabriel of Qatar and Ahob of Qatar. Christianity declined with the arrival of Islam in Eastern Arabia in 628. By 676, the bishops of Beth Qatraye had stopped attending synods; although Christianity persisted in the region until the late 9th century.

The dioceses of Beth Qatraye did not form an ecclesiastical province, except for a short period during the mid-to-late 7th century. They were instead subject to the Metropolitanate of Fars.

=== Post-6th century ===
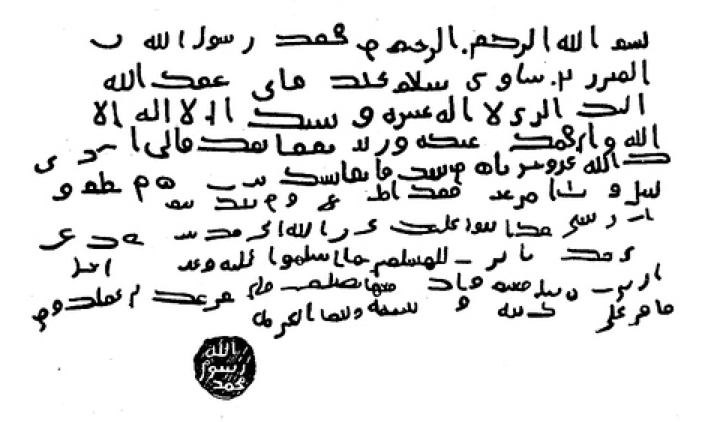
Facsimile of a letter sent by Muhammad to Munzir ibn-Sawa al-Tamimi, governor of Bahrain in AD 628

Hafit {Tuwwam} abounds in palm trees; it lies in the direction of Hajar {Al-Aḥsā}, and the mosque is in the markets ... Dibba and Julfar, both in the direction of the Hajar, are close to the sea ... Tuwwam has been dominated by a branch of the Quraysh ...

— Al-Muqaddasi, 985 CE, The Best Divisions in the Knowledge of the Regions

From the time when Islam emerged in the 7th century until the early 16th century, the term Bahrain referred to the wider historical region of eastern Arabia stretching from Bubiyan Island to the Strait of Hormuz along the coast of the Persian Gulf. Eastern Arabians were amongst the first to embrace Islam during the time of the Islamic prophet Muhammad, who ruled eastern Arabia through one of his representatives, Al-Ala'a Al-Hadhrami. Eastern Arabia embraced Islam in 628 (the seventh year of Hijrah; i.e. 7 AH). During the time of Umar I, a companion of Muhammad, Abu Hurairah was the governor of eastern Arabia. Umar I also appointed Uthman ibn Abi al-As, another companion of Muhammad, as governor of the area. Al Khamis Mosque, built during the reign of the Umayyad caliph Umar II, was one of the earliest mosques built in eastern Arabia.

The expansion of Islam did not affect eastern Arabia's reliance on trade, and its prosperity continued to be dependent on markets in India and Mesopotamia. After Baghdad emerged as the seat of the caliph in 750 following the Abbasid Revolution, eastern Arabia greatly benefited from the city's increased demand for foreign goods, especially from China and South Asia.

Eastern Arabia, and Bahrain more specifically, became a principal centre of knowledge for hundreds of years stretching from the early days of Islam in the 6th century to the 18th century. Philosophers of eastern Arabia were highly esteemed, such as the 13th-century mystic, Sheikh Maitham Al Bahrani (d. 1299). The mosque of Sheikh Maitham and his tomb can be visited in the outskirts of Manama, near the district of Mahooz.

==== Qarmatian Kingdom ====
At the end of the 3rd Hijri century, Abu Sa'id al-Jannabi led the Qarmatian Revolution, a rebellion by a messianic Ismaili sect originating in Kufa in present-day Iraq. Al-Jannabi took over the city of Hajr, Bahrain's capital at that time, and Al-Aḥsā, which he made the capital of his republic. Once in control of the state, he sought to create a utopian society. The Qarmatians' goal was to build a society based on reason and equality. The state was governed by a council of six with a chief who was primus inter pares. All property within the community was distributed evenly among all initiates. The Qarmatians were organized as an esoteric society but not as a secret one; their activities were public and openly propagated, but new members had to undergo an initiation ceremony involving seven stages.

Map of eastern and central Arabia in the 9th–10th centuries

For much of the 10th century the Qarmatians were the most powerful force in the Persian Gulf and Middle East, controlling the coast of Oman, and collecting tribute from the Abbasid caliph in Baghdad and from the rival Ismaili Fatimid caliph in Cairo, whom they did not recognize. The land they ruled over was extremely wealthy, with a huge slave-based economy. According to academic Yitzhak Nakash:

The Qarmatian state had vast fruit and grain estates both on the islands and in Hasa and Qatif. Nasiri Khusru, who visited Hasa in 1051, recounted that these estates were cultivated by some thirty thousand Ethiopian slaves. He mentions that the people of Hasa were exempt from taxes. Those impoverished or in debt could obtain a loan until they put their affairs in order. No interest was taken on loans, and token lead money was used for all local transactions.

— Yitzhak Nakash, Reaching for Power: The Shi'a in the Modern Arab World

The Qarmatians were defeated in battle in 976 by the Abbasids, which precipitated the decline of the Qarmatian state. Around 1058, a revolt on the island of Bahrain led by two Shi'a members of the Abd al-Qays tribe, Abul-Bahlul al-'Awwam and Abu'l-Walid Muslim, heralded the collapse of Qarmatian power and eventually the ascendancy to power of the Uyunids, an Arab dynasty belonging to the Abdul Qays tribe.

==== Uyunid dynasty ====
The Uyunids (Arabic: ٱلْعُيُوْنِيُّوْن, romanized: Al-ʿUyūniyyūn), were an Arab dynasty that ruled eastern Arabia for 163 years, from the 11th to the 13th centuries. They were the remnants of Bani Abdul Qays tribe and seized the country from the Qarmatians with the military assistance of Great Seljuq Empire in 1077-1078 AD. The Uyunids then fell to the Usfurids of Banu Uqayl in 651 AH (1253 AD).

==== Usfurid dynasty ====
The Usfurids were an Arab dynasty that gained control of eastern Arabia in 1253. They were a branch of the Banu Uqayl tribe of the Banu Amir group, and are named after the dynasty's founder, Usfur ibn Rashid. They were initially allies of the Qarmatians and their successors, the Uyunids, but eventually overthrew the latter and seized power themselves. The Usfurids' takeover came after Uyunid power had been weakened by invasion in 1235 by the Salghurid Atabeg of Fars (at that time vassals of the Anushteginids).

The Usfurids had an uneasy relationship with the main regional power at the time, Hormuz, which took control of Bahrain (the island) and Qatif in 1320. However, the Hormuzi rulers did not seem to have firm control of the islands, and during the 14th century Bahrain was disputed as neighbours sought tribute from the wealth accumulated from its pearl fisheries.

==== Jarwanid dynasty ====
The Jarwanid dynasty was a Shi'ite dynasty that ruled eastern Arabia in the 14th century. It was founded by Jerwan I bin Nasser and was based in Qatif. The dynasty was a vassal of the Kingdom of Ormus.

The Jarwanids belonged to the clan of Bani Malik. It is disputed whether they belonged to the Banu Uqayl—the tribe of their predecessors the Usfurids and their successors the Jabrids—or to the Banu Abdul Qays, to whom the Uyunid dynasty (1076–1235) belonged. The Jarwanids came to power some time in the 14th century, after expelling the forces of Sa'eed ibn Mughamis, the chief of the Muntafiq tribe based in the Iraqi city of Basrah.

Contemporary sources such as Ibn Battuta describe the Jarwanids as being "extreme Rāfiḍah," a term for Shi'ites who rejected the first three Caliphs, while Ibn Hajar, a 15th-century Sunni scholar from Egypt, describes them as being "remnants of the Qarmatians." Historian Juan Cole concludes from this that they were Isma'ilis. However, the Twelver Shi'ite sect was promoted under their rule, and Twelver scholars held the judgeships and other important positions, including the chief of the hisba. Also, unlike under the Qarmatians, Islamic prayers were held in the mosques under Jarwanid rule, and prayer was called under the Shi'ite formula. According to Al-Humaydan, who specialized in the history of eastern Arabia, the Jarwanids were Twelvers, and the term "Qarmatian" was simply used as a derogatory epithet for "Shi'ite."

==== Jabrids ====
The Jabrids were a dynasty that dominated eastern Arabia in the 15th and 16th centuries. They were descendants of the Banu Uqayl, a branch of the Banu Amir, like the earlier Usfurids.

Their most prominent ruler was Ajwad ibn Zamil, who died in 1507. He was described by his contemporaries as having been "of Najdi origin." Ajwad's elder brother had earlier established the dynasty in the early 15th century by deposing and killing the last Jarwanid ruler in Qatif. At their height, the Jabrids controlled the entire Arabian coast on the Persian Gulf, including the islands of Bahrain, and regularly led expeditions into central Arabia and Oman. One contemporary scholar described Ajwad ibn Zamil as "the king of al-Ahsa and Qatif and the leader of the people of Najd." Following his death, his kingdom was divided among some of his descendants, with Migrin ibn Zamil (possibly his grandson) inheriting Al-Aḥsā, Qatif, and Bahrain. Migrin fell in battle in Bahrain in a failed attempt to repel an invasion of Bahrain by the Portuguese in 1521.

The Jabrid kingdom collapsed soon afterwards after an invasion of Al-Aḥsā by the Muntafiq tribe of Basra, and later by the Ottoman Empire. However, one branch of the Jabrids remained active in Oman for another three centuries. It is unknown what became of the non-Omani Jabrids. Some believe they are identical with the Jubur section of the Bani Khalid confederation, who eventually took control of the region after the Jabrids.

==== Bani Khalid ====
The main branches of the Bani Khalid are the Humaid, the Jubur, the Du'um, the Janah, the Grusha, the Musallam, the 'Amayer, the Subaih and the Mahashir. The chieftainship of the Bani Khalid has traditionally been held by the Humaid clan. The Bani Khalid dominated the deserts surrounding Al-Aḥsā and Al-Qatif oases during the 16th and 17th centuries. Under Barrak ibn Ghurayr of the Humaid, the Bani Khalid were able to expel Ottoman forces from the cities and towns in 1670 and proclaim their rule over the region. Ibn Ghurayr made his capital in Al-Mubarraz, where remnants of his castle stand today. According to Arabian folklore, one chief of the Bani Khalid attempted to protect the prized desert bustard (habari) from extinction by prohibiting the bedouin in his realm from poaching the bird's eggs, earning the tribe the appellation of "protectors of the eggs of the habari", an allusion to the chief's absolute supremacy over his realm. The first chieftain of the “Khawalid” was Haddori.

Like a vast majority of their subject people, in time the Khalidis adopted Shi'ite Islam (if they were not already so at the time of their ascendency). This led to a lasting animosity between them and the staunchly anti-Shi'ite Wahhabis and the House of Saud from the mid-18th century to the present. The Bani Khalid maintained ties with members of their tribe who had settled in Najd during their earlier migration eastwards, and also cultivated clients among the rulers of the Najdi towns, such as Al Mu'ammar of Al-Uyayna. When the emir of Uyayna adopted the ideas of Muhammad ibn Abd al-Wahhab, the Khalidi chief ordered him to cease support for Ibn Abd al-Wahhab and expel him from his town. The emir agreed, and Ibn Abd al-Wahhab moved to neighboring Dir'iyyah, where he joined forces with the Al Saud. The Bani Khalid remained staunch enemies of the Saudis and their allies and attempted to invade Najd and Diriyyah in an effort to stop Saudi expansion. Their efforts failed, however, and after conquering Najd, the Saudis invaded the Bani Khalid domain in Al-Aḥsā and deposed Al-'Ura'yir in 1793.

When the Egyptians under the Muhammad Ali dynasty invaded Arabia and deposed Abdullah bin Saud Al Saud in 1818, they reoccupied Al-Aḥsā and Al-Qatif and reinstated members of Al 'Uray'ir as governors of the region on their behalf. The Bani Khalid were no longer the potent military force they once were at this time, and tribes such as the Ajman, the Dawasir, the Subay', and Mutayr began encroaching on Bani Khalid's desert territories. They were also beset by internal quarrels over leadership. Though the Bani Khalid were able to forge an alliance with the 'Anizzah tribe in this period, they were eventually defeated by an alliance of several tribes along with Turki bin Abdullah Al Saud, who had re-established Saudi rule in Riyadh in 1823. Battles against a Mutayri–'Ajmani alliance in 1823 and another battle with the Subay' and the Saudis in 1830 brought the rule of the Bani Khalid to a close. The Ottomans appointed a governor from Bani Khalid over Al-Aḥsā once more in 1874, but his rule also was short-lived.

== See also ==
- Achaemenid Arabia
- Falaj
- Musandam Peninsula
- Ras al Hadd
  - Ras al-Jinz
