= Abd al-Qays =

Arab tribe

Abd al-Qays عَبْد القَيْس
- Rabi'i Arab tribe
- Banner of Abd al-Qays in battle of siffin
- Ethnicity: Arab
- Nisba: ‘Abdī, Qaisi, Ab-Qasi
- Location: Eastern Arabia; Iraq; Oman
- Descended from: Abdel-Qays bin Qurayy bin Afsah bin Doumi bin Jadilah bin Anizah bin Asad bin Rabi'a ibn Nizar bin Ma'add bin Adnan
- Parent tribe: Anizah
- Branches: Bani Muharab, Bani Shen, Bani Nakra, Bani Amar(عامر ربيعة)
- Language: Arabic
- Religion: Islam (Mostly Shia)

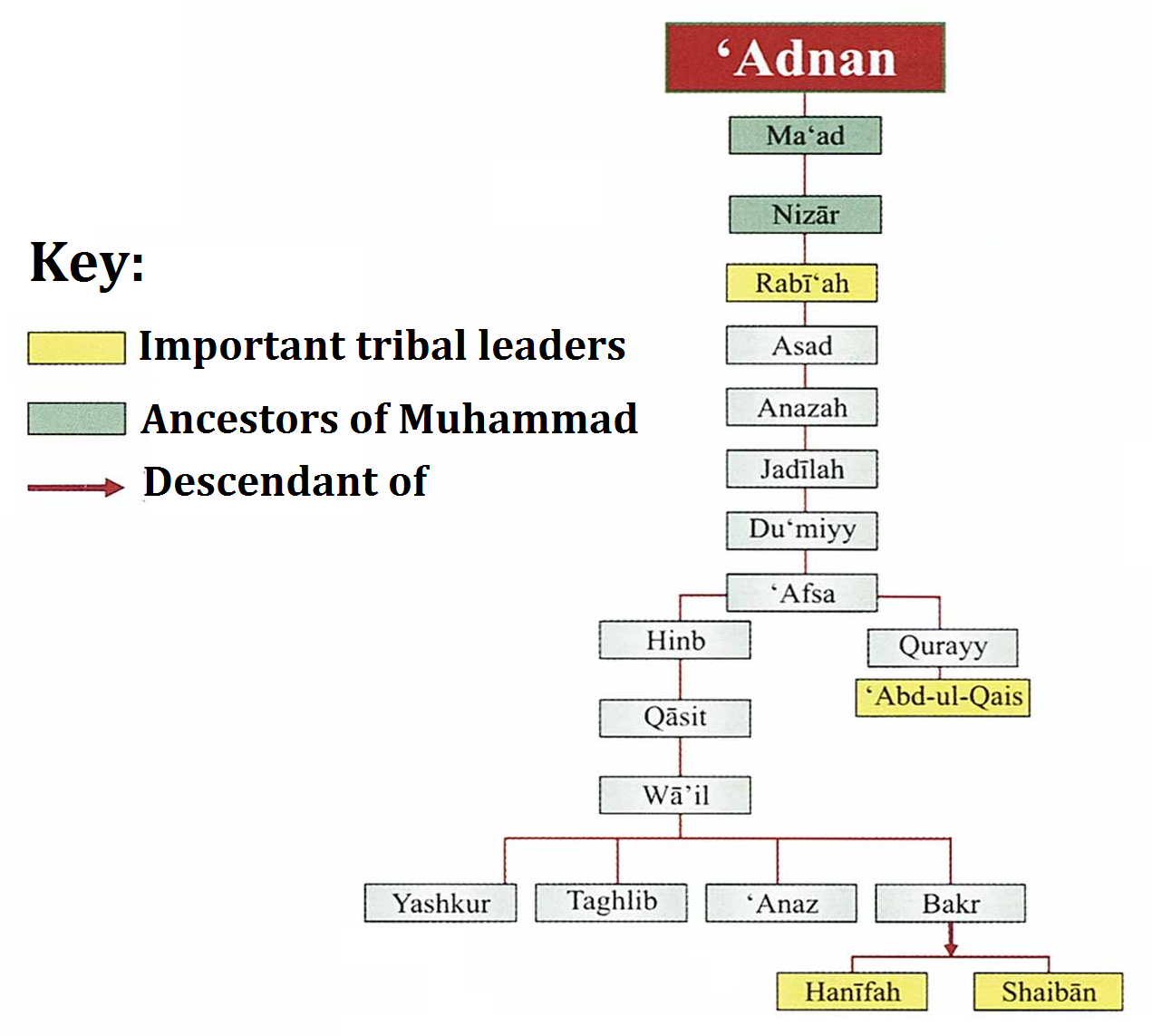
A family tree depicting the ancestry of the Abd al-Qays.

The Abd al-Qays (Arabic: عبد القيس) is an ancient Arabian tribe from the Rabi'a branch of the North Arabian tribes. The tribe is from Eastern Arabia. The majority of the Baharna are from the Abd al-Qays tribe, with a significant minority from the cousin tribes of Bakr and Taghlib Ibn Wai’l tribes, which are today known as the Anizah tribe. The majority of the tribe resides today in the Gulf Cooperation Council countries, which are Kuwait, Saudi Arabia, Bahrain, Qatar, Oman and the UAE.

== History ==
=== Origins ===
The name of the tribe means 'servant of the [god] Qays'. It belonged to the tribal groups originally resident in the area of al-Arid in South Arabia who migrated northwestward to an area extending north to Sudayr and south to al-Kharj. Later, in the Arab genealogical tradition, these tribes were called the Rabi'a, a branch of the northern Arab Ma'add confederation.

=== Campaigns of Shapur II ===
In pre-Islamic times, the Abd al-Qays frequently raided Iran. The Sasanian king Shapur II (r. 309–379) led an expedition against the Arabian tribes, during which he massacred most of the Abd al-Qays. Later, several Abd al-Qays tribesmen were relocated by Shapur to the Iranian province of Kirman.

=== Migrations into eastern Arabia ===
By the 5th century, the Abd al-Qays had shifted to nomadism, dwelling outside of the Tuwaiq escarpment in the southern Najd (central Arabia). In the 6th century, the tribe migrated northeastward the oases of al-Ahsa, Tarout Island and Qatif in eastern Arabia.

=== Islamic period ===
During the Arab conquest of Iran, considerable numbers of Abd al-Qays tribesmen entered Fars taking part in the raids and advancing even to the vicinity of Istakhr (before being repelled) and then taking part in the conquest of Western regions of the Sassanid realm. Several groupings of Abd al-Qays settled near Tavvaz in the Iranian coastal mountains and Basra in lower Mesopotamia. In the early 8th century, 4,000 Abd al-Qays warriors formed part of the army of Qutayba ibn Muslim on his campaign into Khorasan.

The majority of the Baharna are descendants of the Banu Abd al-Qays, while some are from the tribes of Bakr ibn Wa'il and others.

== Religion ==
Abd al-Qays were mostly Christians before the advent of Islam.

== Bibliography ==
- Caskel, W. (1960). "ʿAbd al-Kays". In Gibb, H. A. R.; Kramers, J. H.; Lévi-Provençal, E.; Schacht, J.; Lewis, B. & Pellat, Ch. (eds.). The Encyclopaedia of Islam, Second Edition. Volume I: A–B. Leiden: E. J. Brill. pp. 72–74. OCLC 495469456.
