= Al Qarah =

Al Qarah may refer to:

- Al Qarah (Egypt), a village in Abu Tisht, Qena
- Al-Qarah, a village in Eastern Province, Saudi Arabia
- al-Qarah, Hadhramaut, a village in Yemen
- Al qarah, San‘a’, Yemen
- Al-Qarah Mountain (Saudi Arabia) or Al-Shabaab Mountain, a mesa
- Al-Qarah Mountain, in the Dhofar Mountains of Oman and Yemen

== See also ==
- Qarah (disambiguation)
