= Al-Ahsa Water Springs =

Al-Ahsa Water Springs عيون الأحساء
- Location within Saudi Arabia
- Coordinates: 25°23′N 49°36′E
- Country: Saudi Arabia
- Time zone: UTC+3

Al-ahsa water spring is a flowing water spring, as described in the book Oasis of Al-Ahsa, by author Federico S. Vidal, which he wrote in 1952 when he was working in the Arabian-American Oil Company (ARAMCO) and he submitted it to Harvard University as a subject for his doctorate degree thesis in 1964. The estimated number of Al-ahsa springs is between sixty and seventy springs, including four huge springs. They flow individually sometimes, or in groups and it is artesian in its flow. The approximate flow of the spring is about 150 thousand gallons in a minute. The springs vary in depth significantly, ranging between 500 feet (150 m) to 600 feet (180 m) and the depth of some of the large springs is just a little off the earth's surface. The water of the spring is warm, the temperature ranges between 80 °F (27 °C) and 90 °F (32 °C), however, some of them are considered as hot springs, with a temperature of over 90 °F (32 °C), and Najim spring counts as one of the hot springs with sulfur water.

== Al-haqel spring "Ain Al-haqel" ==
This is one of the largest water springs, Al-ahsa, and the second water spring in terms of water availability and strength, its flow is considered as the greatest between the oasis springs, estimated at 22,500 gallons per minute. This spring is located 1 km east of Al-hofuf. Its water irrigates large areas of the orchards around it. Al-haqel spring forms a very large lake at its source and when it starts to flow, its paths branch to a large number of water distribution channels which irrigate orchards and rice fields.

== AL-harra spring "Ain AL-harra" ==
This spring is located in the north of Al-mubarraz and is one of the largest springs in Al-ahsa. The flow is about 20,000 gallons per minute. The water of this spring is a bit warm and it reaches the earth surface through three nozzles which form a huge lake. Its dimensions are around 400×100 yards.

== Al-jawharia spring "Ain Al-jawharia " ==
This is an average size spring with 3,000 gallons flow per minute, and is located near to Al-battalyia village.

== Al-khadoud spring "Ain Al-khadoud" ==
A large spring whose flow is about 20,000 gallons per minute. It is an important water source for the eastern side of Al-ahsa.

== Najim spring "Ain Najim" ==
It is a middle-sized spring with sulfur water, which is located 2 km far from the west of Al-Mubarak. The spring was important during the Ottoman rule for its therapeutic efficacy, but the Saudis demolished its dome at 1862, and they rebuilt it in 1913 when king Abdul-Aziz took Al-ahsa back. It did not take long to become popular again with people who suffered from rheumatic diseases and multiple sclerosis, due to its hot water. Mosel narrated that the representatives of the people of Al-ahsa surrendered at 1792 for Imam Saud bin Abdul-Aziz at Najim spring. There is a popular belief attributing the presence of "Najim " to where a meteorite fell. Nowadays, it is reported that the most of Al-ahsa springs formed in that way.

== Um-saba'a spring "Ain Um-saba'a" ==
A large spring with 20,000 gallons flow per minute, the spring water is hot and its temperature at sides reaches 101 °F (38 °C), with the middle of the lake (which is above the spring's nozzles) hitting a temperature of 104 °F (40 °C). Its water reaches the orchards through seven major rivers, so it called by "Um-saba'a" because of these seven rivers, but now there are only five of them.
