= Muhaires Castle =

Muhaires Castle قصر محيرس
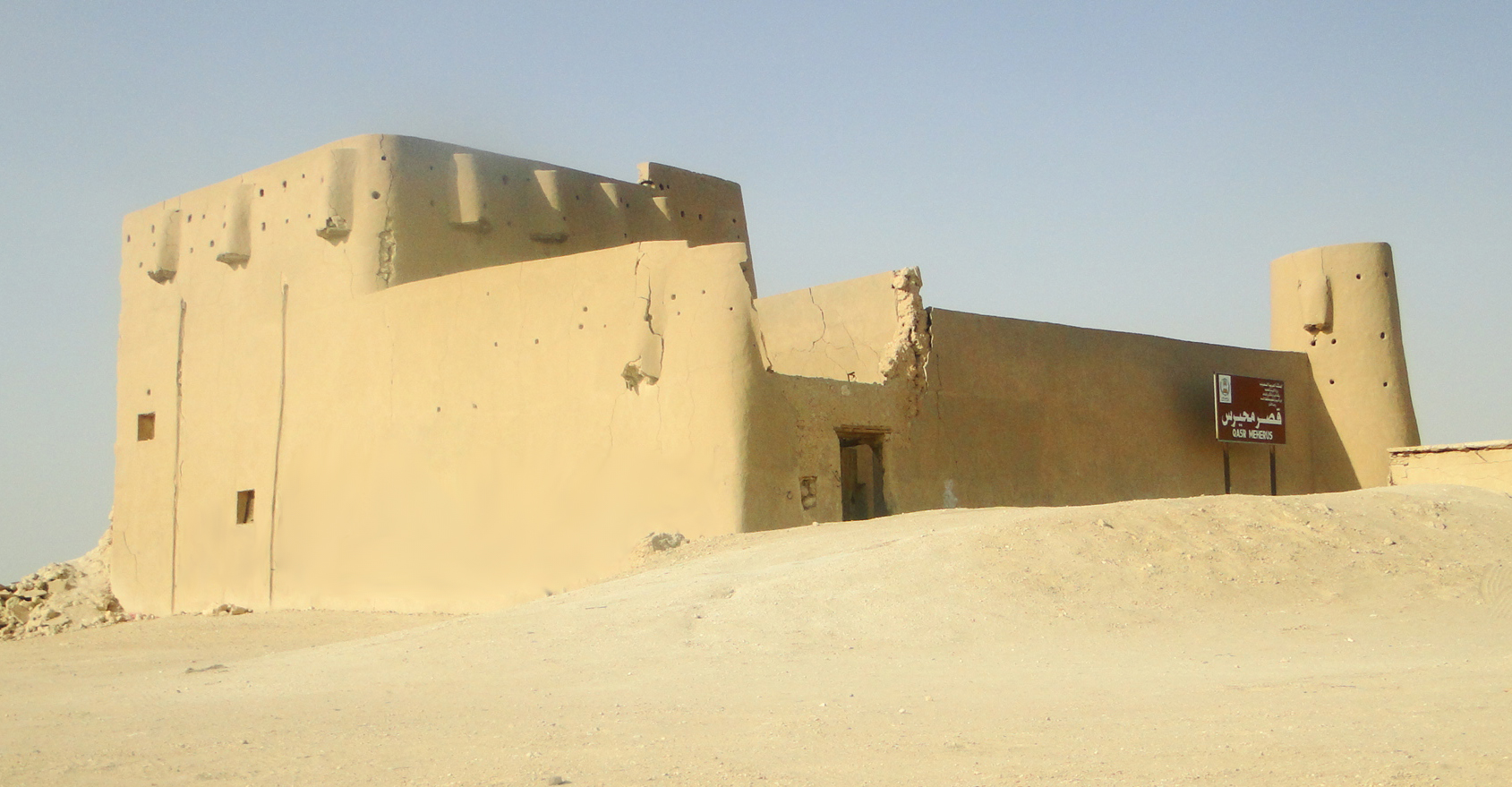

- Location within Saudi Arabia
- Coordinates: 25°23′N 49°36′E
- Country: Saudi Arabia

Government
  - Governor: Badr Bin Muhammad Bin Abdullah Bin Jalawi Al Saud
- Time zone: UTC+3

Muhaires castle located in Al-Ahsa governorate, at the eastern region of Saudi Arabia. the castle was built by Al-Imam Saud bin Abdul-Aziz on the top of a hill at 1208 Hijri for military purposes. It is a small military castle consist of round towers with rooms, Weapons, supplies and ammunition were stored there. This castle existed during the battle between Al-Imam forces and Zaid bin Uray'er forces, and expelling them from the north of Al-mubarraz and the northern villages.

== Construction site ==
It is located in the northeast of the center of the Saudi Irrigation organization. Now it is surrounded by new buildings in the Al-Andalus neighborhood which is known as " Alrashedya " in the Al-Ahsa governorate.

== Rebuilding and maintenance ==
In the past, the castle consisted of two floors, built with stones and mud, and it has an external wall supported with a cylindrical tower, located in the southeast corner. In the southern wall of the castle, there is a gate to a small roofless courtyard with a water-well in the center. There are three long rooms preceding the courtyard and an additional two rooms exist above them. The space around the castle has been developed to establish "Muhaires castle park" which has cultivated spaces with supporting facilities like restrooms, playground equipment, lights and food kiosks. The Saudi commission for tourism and national heritage attended Al-Ahsa municipality's signing of a memorandum of understanding to develop Muhaires castle, which was during a Saudi travel & tourism investment market ( STTIM) in 2014. There is qualification of five historical sites in Al-Ahsa, with Muhaires castle being one of them, and similarly to other historical and archaeological sites which are known in the area, it is built from mud, in addition to raw materials such as burlap and hay.
