= Al-Ahsa Governorate =

Al-Ahsa Governorate محافظة الأحساء
- Governorate
- Coat of arms

- Location of Al-Ahsa Governorate within the Eastern Province

- Location within Saudi Arabia
- Coordinates: 25°23′N 49°36′E
- Country: Saudi Arabia
- Province: Eastern Province
- Seat: Hofuf

Government
  - Type: Municipality
  - Body: Al-Ahsa Municipality
  - Governor: Saud bin Talal

Area
  - Total: 375,000 km^{2} (145,000 sq mi)

Population (2022)
  - Total: 1,104,267
  - Density: 2.94/km^{2} (7.63/sq mi)
- Time zone: UTC+03:00 (SAST)
- ISO 3166-2: SA-04
- Area code: 013
- Website: www.alhasa.gov.sa

Al-Ahsa, (Note: Arabic: الأحساء) historically known as Hajar and also referred to as Al-Hasa, (Note: Arabic: الحسا) is a governorate in the Eastern Province of Saudi Arabia. It is the largest governorate in the country by area, covering approximately 375,000 km². As of 2022, it had a population of 1,104,267. Its seat is Hofuf.

== History ==
The habitation of the oasis of Al-Ahsa goes back into the pre-history of human existence, which was started by the pastoral Semites, and the subsequent migrations of the major Semitic tribes in the Arabian Peninsula to the north and east. Additionally, it has served as a commercial crossroads of trade routes linking the Arabian Peninsula with Persia and India through the port of Uqair and the port of Qatif. In terms of agricultural importance, Al-Ahsa is of great importance since its area is made up of fertile lands and contains abundant water sources.

The Jerhaites, a branch of the Chaldeans, settled in the region. The description of their city came from the Greek traveler Strabo, who said about Al-Ahsa:

"It was founded by Chaldean immigrants from Babylon in a swampy land, and it was built of salt stones, eighty thousand cubits away from the sword of the sea."

The Greek historian Polybius also described Al-Ahsa as an important commercial center, one of the active markets in the Arab countries, and a crossroads for the caravan routes coming from southern Arabia, the Levant, the Hijaz, Iraq and India.

=== City of Hejir ===
Al-Ahsa then became a part of a city belonging to the territory of Bahrain at that time, located between Ras Al-Qara mountain, Abu Hasis mountain, and the northern part of Jabal al-Qarah in Al-Ahsa today a place now called the town of Al-Kawarij. The town was of importance to the inhabitants of the Arabian Peninsula, because of the port of Al-Uqair, which served as a link in bringing goods and exporting them to and from Persia, India, China, Africa and Mesopotamia.The port made it the great market for the central and eastern regions of it.

When the Islamic call appeared, the Messenger Muhammad sent al-Ala ibn Abd Allah al-Hadrami in the seventh century AD corresponding to the eighth year of the Hijri to invite the people of Hejir to Islam, which they accepted.

=== Islamic times ===
Eastern Arabia was conquered by the emerging Rashidun Caliphate during the 7th century. It was later inherited by the Umayyads and Abbasids. In 899 A.D., the region came under the control of the Qarmatian leader, Abu Tahir al-Jannabi, and was declared independent from the Abbasid Caliphate of Baghdad. Its capital was at al-Mu'miniya near modern Hofuf. By circa 1000, Al-Hasa became the 9th largest city worldwide, supporting 100,000 inhabitants. In 1077, the Qarmatian state of Al-Ahsa was overthrown by the Uyunids. Al-Ahsa subsequently fell under the rule of the Bahrani dynasty of the Usfurids, followed by their relatives, the Jabrids, who became one of the most formidable powers in the region, retaking the islands of Bahrain from the princes of Hormuz. The last Jabrid ruler of Bahrain was Muqrin ibn Zamil.

In 1521, the Portuguese Empire conquered the Awal Islands (the islands that comprise present day Bahrain) from the Jabrid ruler Muqrin ibn Zamil, who fell strongly in battle. The Jabrids struggled to maintain their position on the mainland in the face of the Ottomans and their tribal allies, the Muntafiq. In 1550, Al-Ahsa and nearby Qatif came under the sovereignty of the Ottoman Empire with Sultan Suleiman I and was later lost to the Portuguese in 1551.

The Ottomans were expelled from Al-Ahsa in 1670, and the region came under the rule of the chiefs of Banu Khalid tribe.

Al-Ahsa, along with Qatif, was incorporated into the Wahhabist Emirate of Diriyah in 1795, but returned to Ottoman control in 1818 with an invasion ordered by Muhammad Ali of Egypt. The Banu Khalid were again installed as rulers of the region but, in 1830, the Emirate of Nejd retook the region.

Direct Ottoman rule was restored in 1871, and Al-Ahsa was placed first under Baghdad Vilayet and with Baghdad's subdivision Basra Vilayet in 1875. In 1913, ibn Saud, the founder of modern Saudi Arabia, annexed Al-Ahsa and Qatif into his domain of Najd.

=== Timeline ===
- Al-Ahsa has been inhabited since prehistoric times, due to its abundance of water.
- 627 CE: Muhammad orders the Third Raid on Banu Thalabah in Al-Taraf, now part of the Al-Ahsa governorate.
- 899: Al-Ahsa comes under control of the Qarmatian leader, Abu-Sa'id Jannabi, and is declared independent from the Abbasids of Baghdad. The capital is Al-Mu'miniya (near modern Hofuf).
- 1000: Al-Ahsa is among the 10 largest cities on earth, with 110,000 inhabitants.
- 1077: The Qarmatian state of Al-Ahsa is overthrown by the Uyunids.
- 1238: Usfurid dynasty takes over the region of Al-Ahsa and Al-Qatif.
- 1383: Usfurids are overthrown by the Jarwanids.
- 1440: The Jabrids take over Al-Ahsa, Qatif, Bahrain, and Kish Island, and extend their influence to eastern Nejd.
- 1521: Jabrid kingdom falls to the Portuguese.
- 1670: the Ottomans are expelled from the region by the tribe of Banu Khalid, who make their capital in Al-Mubarraz.
- 1795: Conquered by Saudi troops during the formation of the First Saudi State.
- 1818: Reconquered by the Ottoman Empire by Ottoman Egyptian forces overthrowing the First Saudi State in the process and granting the local tribe of Banu Khalid self-rule.
- 1830: Comes under the control of the Second Saudi State.
- 1871: The Second Saudi Dynasty loses the region to the Ottoman Empire again; however, this time it is directly ruled from Baghdad instead of by tribe of Bani Khalid under self-rule has had been the case in the past during Ottoman ownerships.
- 1913: King Abdulaziz Al Saud conquers Al-Ahsa Oasis, annexing it into his Kingdom of Najd. (This is recognised in the Treaty of Sèvres signed in 1920 with the other official partitionings of the Ottoman Empire.)
- 1932: Al-Ahsa becomes part of the Kingdom of Saudi Arabia, under the King Abdulaziz.
- 1930s: Huge petroleum deposits are discovered near Dammam, resulting in rapid modernization for the region.

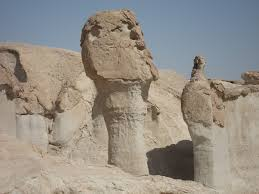
Al-Qarah Mountain is located 16 km (9.9 mi) east of Hofuf City.

- Early 1960s: The oil fields in Al-Ahsa reach the production level of 1 million barrels per day.

Al-Ahsa joined the UNESCO Global Network of Learning Cities in 2024.

== Administrative subdivisions ==
The governorate of Al-Ahsa has seven marakiz. They do not have any administrative functions, but can still be proclaimed as an administrative division.

The marakiz are:

- Al Hafayer
- Al Ubaylah
- Al-Jafr, Saudi Arabia
- Haradh
- Hofuf
- Rumailah, Saudi Arabia
- Shaybah
- Al-Hofuf is the capital city of the Al-Ahsa province and has many traditional markets, it assimilated the historical village of al-Taymiyyah and al-Mutayrif among others.
- Al-Mubarraz (also spelled Al-Mobarraz), in Arabic المبرز, is one of the two main cities of the governorate.
- Al-Oyoon (also spelled Al-Uyoon or Al-Oyoun)
- Al-Omran (also spelled Al-Umran), in Arabic العمران, has an area of more than 6 km^{2}6 square kilometres (2.3 mi^{2}) and a population of more than 49,000 (in 1997). It consists of about 17 villages, including Al-Hutah, Al-Rumailah, North Al-Omran, South Al-Omran, Ghomsi, Al-Ulayyah, Abu Al-Hasa, Abu Thur, Al-Sayayrah, Al-Suwydrah, Al-Aramyah, Fariq Al-Raml, Wasit, Al- Shuwaikiah, Al-Sabaykh and Al-Nakheel. The Al-Sawab Club is situated in Al-Omran.
- Shaybah (oil town in the Empty Quarter)

=== Eastern villages ===
Here is an incomplete list (population in 1997):

- Al-Taraf (+27,000) which is famous for its four hills and its small zoo.
- Al-Rumailah (probably +12,020) It is well known because Al-Romailah existed at the time of Muhammad
- Al-Holailah (+21,000)
- Al-Battaliyah (+20,000)
- Al-Shu'bah (+17,000)
- Al-Omran (+49,000) which is a well-known village and has its own municipality
- Al-Munaizlah (+17,000)
- Al-Garah (+13,000) which is well known for its mountain Jabl Al-Garah
- Al-Jafr (+13,000) which is well known for its own police station and other government offices
- Al-Kilabiyah (+12,000) located about 10 km (6.2 miles) from Al-Hofuf
- Al-Mansorah (+10,000)
- Al-Towaithir (+8000)
- Al-Fudhool (+8000)
- Al-Markaz (+9000) (Arabic: ٱلْمَرْكَز, Arabic: قَرْيَة ٱلْمَرْكَز, romanized: Qaryat Al-Markaz, also spelled Al-Markez). It is about 15 km (9.3 miles) from Al-Hofuf.
- Al-Hotah (Probably +7000)
- Bani Ma'an (Arabic: بَنِي مَعن), one of the oldest villages. It is believed that it was bigger in the past.
- Al-Dalwah
- Al-Shahareen
- Al-Sabat
- Abu Thor
- Al-Turaibil
- Al-Tuhaimiyah
- Al-Mizawi
- Al-Jeshah (+29,000)
- Al-Jubail (+10,000)

=== Northern villages ===
Here is an incomplete list:

- Al-Gherain
- Al-Mutairfi (+29,000) which is well known for its natural springs
- Al-Julaijlah
- Al-Marah
- Al-Garn
- Al-Shigaig
- Al-Wazziyah.

=== Associated small villages ===
Here is an incomplete list:

- Al Hafayer
- Yabrin

== Transportation ==
Al-Ahsa International Airport (IATA: HOF) is the city's main airport. The airport is located 25 km from the city center and serves weekly local flights to Jeddah, Al-Medina and international flights to Dubai. The city is served by a modern major highway system; Al-Ahsa / Riyadh highway; that links the city to KSA central region. Al-Ahsa / Dammam highway; that links the city to the rest of KSA eastern region and Kuwait. Al-Ahsa / Abu Dhabi highway; that links the city to UAE and Oman.

The city has a railway station connecting the city with the capital Riyadh to the west and Dammam to the north. The main charter bus company in the kingdom, known as the Saudi Public Transport Company (SAPTCO), offers trips both within the kingdom and to its neighboring countries.

A road between Oman and Saudi Arabia, which goes through the Empty Quarter, was completed in September 2021. Measuring between 700 and 800 kilometres (430 and 500 miles) in total, it extends from Al-Ahsa to the Omani town of Ibri. The Omani side of the road measures approximately 160 km (99 miles), and the Saudi side 580 km (360 miles).

== Recreation sites ==
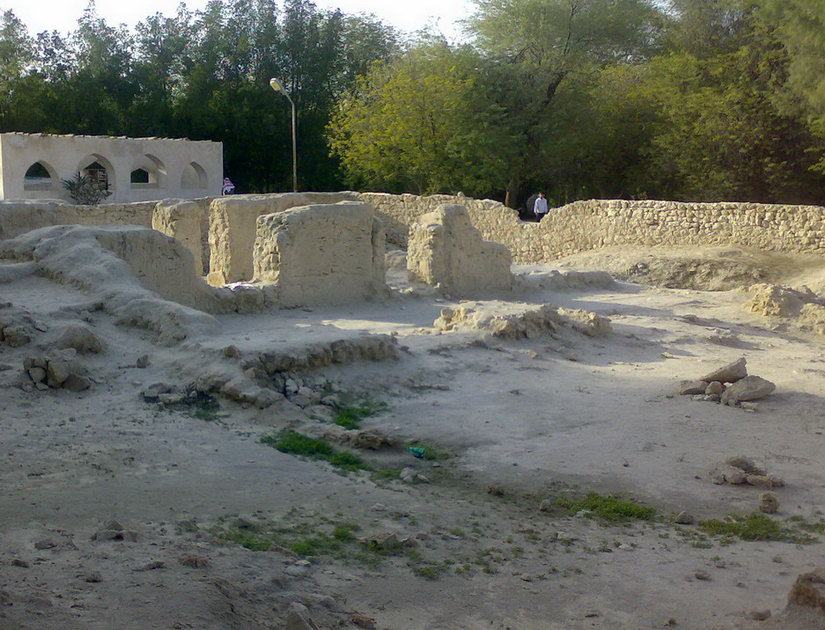
Jawatha Mosque

One of the oldest mosques in Islam, Jawatha Mosque, is reputed to be found here, as well, and several historic remnants of Ottoman Turkish influence can be seen in buildings such as Qasr Ibrahim and the Qasr Sahood. Many pictures of old Al-Ahsa and the Eastern Province were taken by the Danish explorer and convert to Islam Knud Holmboe (1902–1931) in his travels through the Middle East.

Here is a list of some historical and recreation sites:

- Jawatha Mosque
- Uqair: Seaport is situated on the Persian Gulf in eastern Al-Ahsa. It has lost its focal role as a fishing and transport site, and is now an outing place for people of the region.
- Qaṣr Ibrāhīm (Arabic: قَصْر إِبْرَاهِيْم) is a castle built during Ottoman rule. It is located prominently in Al-Hofuf city.
- Natural Springs like those in Umm Sabaa provides curative mineral water at a steady rate.
- Jabl Al-Garah is a hill (locally called a mountain) in Al-Garah a village of the same name offers visitors cool air in the summer months.
- Qasr Sahood (Arabic: قصر صاهود) is a Palace built during Ottoman rule in the city of Al-Mubarraz.
- Salwa Beach (Arabic: شاطىء سلوى) is sandy beach about 150 km (93 miles) from Al-Hofuf.
- Al-Shu'ba Mountain (Arabic: جبل الشعبة).
- Al-arba' Mountain (Arabic: جبل الأربع) are sandy hills about 21 km (13 miles) from Al-Hofuf, on the way to Qatar.
- Al-Ahsa National Museum.
- Al-Ahsa National Park, located at Al-Omran town.

== See also ==
- Provinces of Saudi Arabia
- List of governorates of Saudi Arabia
- List of cities and towns in Saudi Arabia
