= Al-Ahsa Oasis =

Oasis historical region in eastern Saudi Arabia

Al-Ahsa Oasis, an Evolving Cultural Landscape
UNESCO World Heritage Site
- Location within Saudi Arabia Location within West and Central Asia
- Location: Hofuf, Al-Ahsa Governorate, Saudi Arabia
- Criteria: Cultural: (iii), (iv), (v)
- Reference: 1563
- Inscription: 2018 (42nd Session)
- Area: 8,544 ha (21,110 acres)
- Buffer zone: 21,556 ha (53,270 acres)
- Coordinates: 25°25′46″N 49°37′19″E

Al-Ahsa Oasis (Arabic: الْأَحْسَاء, al-ʾAhsā), also known as al-Ḥasāʾ (الْحَسَا) or Hajar (هَجَر), is an oasis and historical region in eastern Saudi Arabia. Al-Ahsa Governorate, which makes up much of the country's Eastern Province, is named after it. The oasis is located about 60 km (37 miles) inland from the coast of the Persian Gulf. Al-Ahsa Oasis comprises four main cities and 22 villages. The cities include Al-Mubarraz and Al-Hofuf, two of the largest cities in Saudi Arabia.

== Description ==
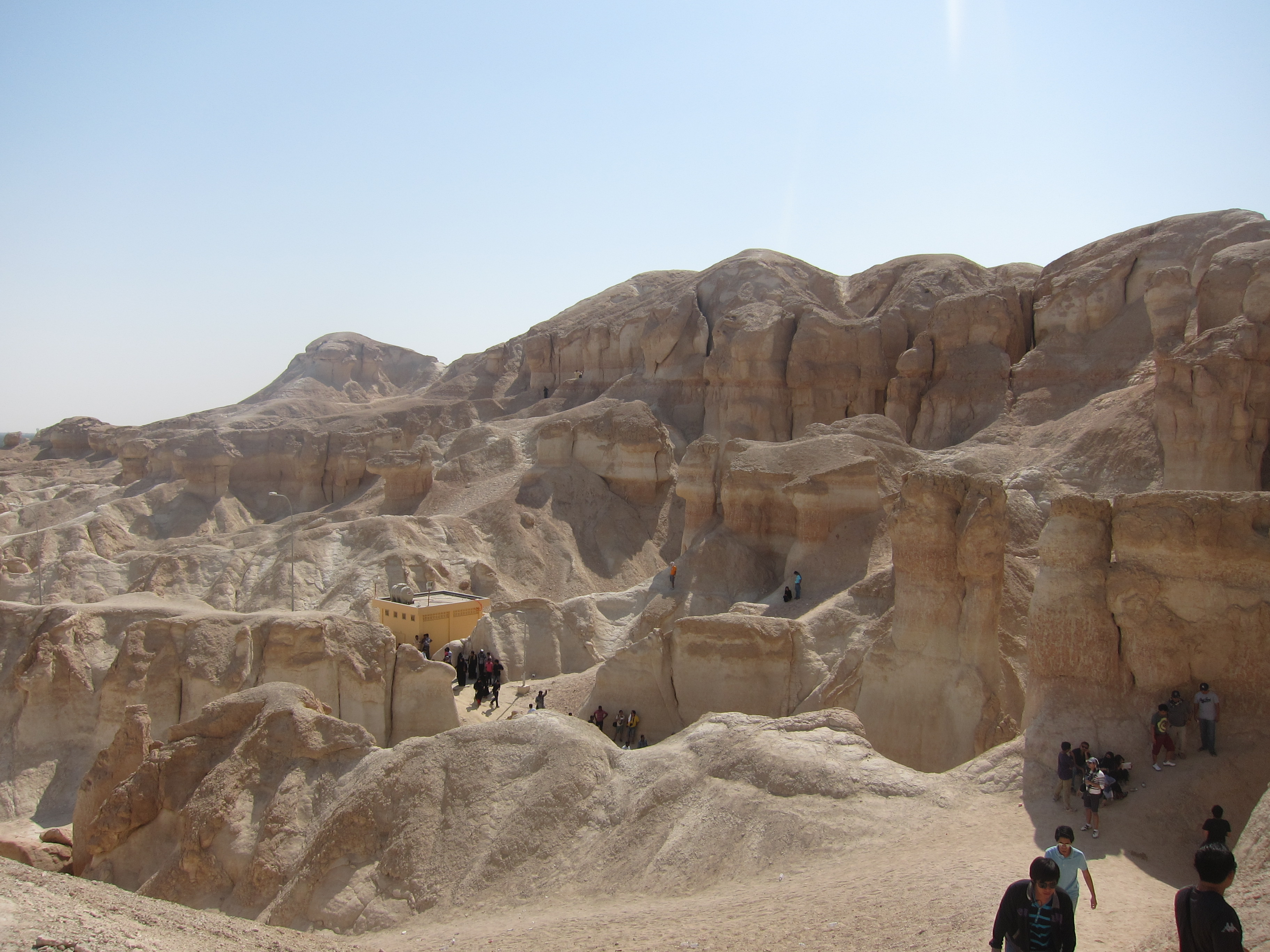
Jabal Al-Qarah is located 16 km (9.9 miles) east of Hofuf City

With an area of nearly 85.4 km^{2} (33.0 sq mi), Al-Ahsa Oasis is the largest oasis in the world. The majority of the oasis is located in the Empty Quarter, also referred to as Rub' al Khali in Arabic. This covers almost three-quarters of the land in the oasis, while residential areas constitute 18%.

There are more than 2.5 million palm trees including date palms in the oasis, which is fed from a huge underground aquifer and irrigated by the flow of more than 280 artesian springs, allowing year-round agriculture in a region that is otherwise sand desert.

The oasis became a World Heritage site in 2018. It has also been part of the UNESCO Creative Cities Network since December 2015. According to one author, the oases of Al-Ahsa and Al Ain (in the U.A.E., on the border with Oman) are the most important in the Persian Gulf region.

== Etymology ==
Al-Ahsa is the plural form of "Al-Ḥisā" (Arabic: ٱلْحِسَى) which refers to a landscape of accumulated sand with an impermeable layer underneath. When rain falls onto such a landscape, the water soaks through the sand (which prevents it from evaporating) and is retained by the impermeable base layer, forming an aquifer. Wells drilled into the earth can then provide access to a cool spring.

The area used to be called Pit-Ardashir (Classical Syriac: ܦܝܛܐܪܕܫܝܪ) by Assyrians and Persians.

== History ==
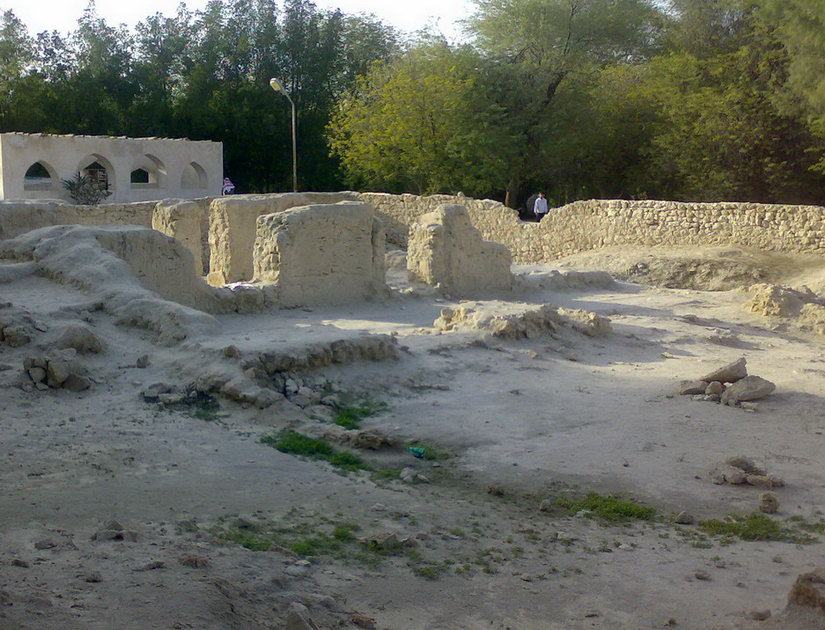
Jawatha Mosque in Al-Ahsa

=== Ancient history ===
Al-Ahsa has been inhabited since prehistoric times because of its abundance of water in an otherwise arid region. Natural fresh-water springs have surfaced at oases in the region for millennia, encouraging human habitation and agricultural efforts (date palm cultivation especially) since prehistoric times.

The oasis region and specifically the name Hajar (also Hagar, Haǧar) may be related to the Ancient Near East toponym Agarum, mentioned in Dilmunite inscriptions as the original home of their chief deity Inzak. If so, Agarum probably referred to the mainland area of Arabia lying opposite Bahrain. According to the hypothesis, the Dilmun civilization originated at the oases of Eastern Arabia, but later relocated to the isle of Bahrain. This interpretation is not without criticism, however, and other sources place Agarum on the isle of Failaka.

=== Islamic times ===
Eastern Arabia was conquered by the emerging Rashidun Caliphate during the 7th century. It was later inherited by the Umayyads and Abbasids. In 899 the region came under the control of the Qarmatian leader Abu Tahir al-Jannabi and was declared independent from the Abbasid Caliphate of Baghdad. Its capital was at al-Mu'miniya near modern Hofuf. By circa 1000, Al-Ahsa became the ninth largest city worldwide supporting 100,000 inhabitants. In 1077, the Qarmatian state of Al-Ahsa was overthrown by the Uyunids. Al-Ahsa subsequently fell under the rule of the Bahrani dynasty of the Usfurids, followed by their relatives, the Jabrids, who became one of the most formidable powers in the region, retaking the islands of Bahrain from the princes of Hormuz. The last Jabrid ruler of Bahrain was Muqrin ibn Zamil.

In 1521, the Portuguese Empire conquered the Awal Islands (the islands that comprise present-day Bahrain) from the Jabrid ruler Muqrin ibn Zamil. The Jabrids struggled to maintain their position on the mainland in the face of the Ottomans and their tribal allies, the Muntafiq. In 1550, Al-Ahsa and nearby Qatif came under the sovereignty of the Ottoman Empire with Sultan Suleiman I. Al-Ahsa was nominally the Eyalet of Lahsa in the Ottoman administrative system and was usually a vassal of the Sublime Porte. Qatif was later lost to the Portuguese. The Ottomans were expelled from Al-Ahsa in 1670, and the region came under the Banu Khalid Emirate.

Al-Ahsa, along with Qatif, was incorporated into the Wahhabist Emirate of Diriyah in 1795 but returned to Ottoman control in 1818 with an invasion ordered by Muhammad Ali of Egypt. The Banu Khalid were again installed as rulers of the region but, in 1830 the Emirate of Nejd retook the region.

Direct Ottoman rule was restored in 1871, and Al-Ahsa was placed first under Baghdad Vilayet and with Baghdad's subdivision Basra Vilayet in 1875. In 1913, ibn Saud, the founder of modern Saudi Arabia, annexed Al-Ahsa and Qatif into his domain of Najd.

=== Saudi independence ===
On 2 December 1922, Percy Cox officially notified Kuwait's Emir Sheikh Ahmad Al-Sabah that Kuwait's borders had been modified. Earlier that year, Major John More, the British representative in Kuwait, had met with Ibn Saud to settle the border issue between Kuwait and Najd. The result of the meeting was the Uqair Protocol of 1922, in which Britain recognized ibn Saud's sovereignty over territories claimed by the emir of Kuwait. Al-Ahsa was taken from the Ottomans in 1913, bringing the Al Sauds control of the Persian Gulf coast and what would become Saudi Arabia's vast oil reserves.

== Economy and infrastructure ==
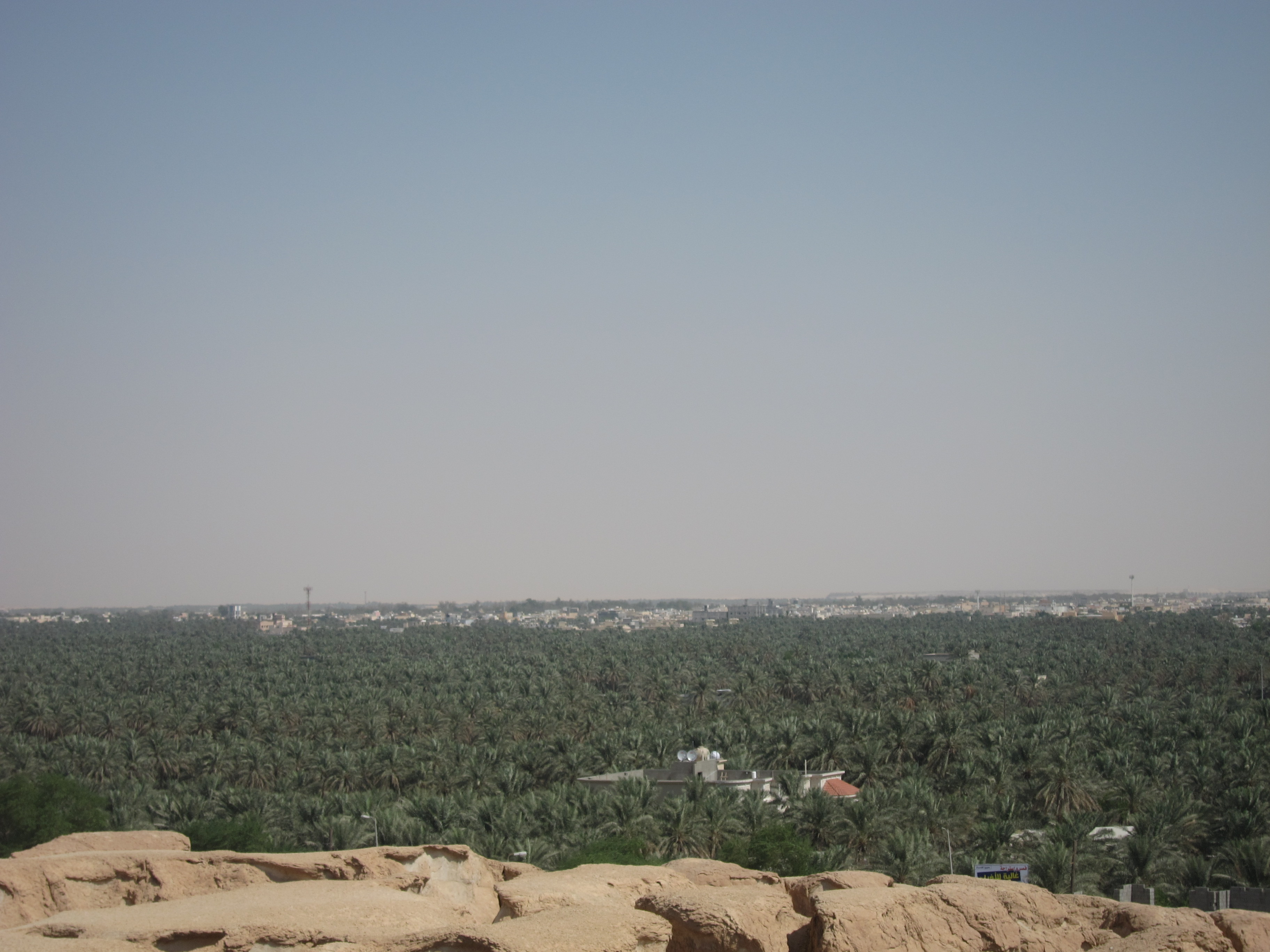
The oasis of palm trees

Al-Ahsa is part of the region known historically for its high skill in tailoring, especially in making bisht, a traditional men's cloak. Al-Ahsa was one of the few areas in the Arabian Peninsula in which rice was grown. In 1938, petroleum deposits were discovered near Dammam, resulting in the rapid modernization of the region. By the early 1960s, oil production levels reached 1 million barrels (160,000 m^{3}) per day. Today, Al-Ahsa is home to the largest conventional oil field in the world, the Ghawar Field.

Al-Ahsa is known for its palm trees and date palms. Al-Ahsa has over 2.5 million palm trees which produce over 100,000 tons of dates every year.

The oasis is a popular tourist destination for Qatari nationals, who would make the 160-km cross-border drive to visit local attractions, as well as to find bargains for food, spices and clothing in Al-Ahsa's bazaars. Economic ties were severely disrupted by the Qatar diplomatic crisis, which led to the closure of Saudi Arabia's land border with Qatar. With the crisis' resolution and border reopening in 2021, however, Qatari tourists have gradually returned to Al-Ahsa; albeit in smaller numbers, due to improved Qatari self-sufficiency in goods.

A road between Oman and Saudi Arabia, through the vast Empty Quarter sand desert, was completed in September 2021. Between 700 and 800 kilometres (430 and 500 miles) long, it extends from Al-Ahsa to the Omani town of Ibri. The Omani side of the road measures approximately 160 km (99 miles), and the Saudi side 580 km (360 miles).

== Tourist sites ==
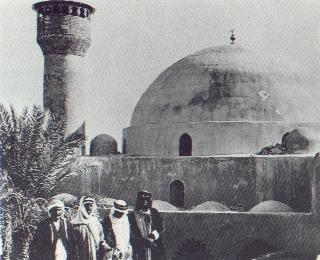
Qasr Ibrahim, built in 1556

12 locations were defined as the Cultural Landscape of Al-Ahsa Oasis (the World Heritage site):

1. Eastern Oasis (الواحة الشرقية)
2. Northern Oasis (الواحة الشمالية)
3. As-Seef (السِيف)
4. Suq Al-Qaysariyah (سوق القيصرية)
5. Qasr Khuzam (قصر خزام)
6. Qasr Sahood (قصر صاهود)
7. Qasr Ibrahim (قصر إبراهيم)
8. Jawatha archaeological site (موقع جواثا الأثري)
9. Jawatha Mosque (مسجد جواثا)
10. Al-'Oyun village (قرية العيون)
11. Ain Qannas archaeological site (موقع عين قناص الأثري)
12. Al-Asfar lake (بحيرة الأصفر)

== Climate ==
Al-Ahsa has a hot desert climate (Köppen Climate Classification: BWh), with long, extremely hot summers and short, very mild winters. The oasis has a very low annual precipitation of 83.3 mm (3.28 in), but receives a small amount of rain in winter and spring.

Climate data for Al Ahsa (1985–2010)
Month	Jan	Feb	Mar	Apr	May	Jun	Jul	Aug	Sep	Oct	Nov	Dec	Year
Record high °C (°F)	32.7 (90.9)	37.8 (100.0)	41.2 (106.2)	45.0 (113.0)	49.0 (120.2)	50.6 (123.1)	50.8 (123.4)	49.7 (121.5)	48.0 (118.4)	45.6 (114.1)	45.8 (114.4)	32.5 (90.5)	50.8 (123.4)
Mean daily maximum °C (°F)	21.2 (70.2)	24.2 (75.6)	28.9 (84.0)	35.1 (95.2)	41.5 (106.7)	44.4 (111.9)	45.7 (114.3)	45.4 (113.7)	42.3 (108.1)	37.6 (99.7)	29.9 (85.8)	23.4 (74.1)	35.0 (95.0)
Daily mean °C (°F)	14.7 (58.5)	17.2 (63.0)	21.5 (70.7)	27.2 (81.0)	33.3 (91.9)	36.3 (97.3)	37.8 (100.0)	37.2 (99.0)	33.8 (92.8)	29.2 (84.6)	22.4 (72.3)	16.6 (61.9)	27.3 (81.1)
Mean daily minimum °C (°F)	8.5 (47.3)	10.6 (51.1)	14.3 (57.7)	19.6 (67.3)	24.9 (76.8)	27.6 (81.7)	29.4 (84.9)	28.9 (84.0)	25.3 (77.5)	21.1 (70.0)	15.6 (60.1)	10.5 (50.9)	19.7 (67.5)
Record low °C (°F)	−2.3 (27.9)	1.0 (33.8)	0.7 (33.3)	7.3 (45.1)	17.0 (62.6)	18.3 (64.9)	19.8 (67.6)	19.7 (67.5)	17.3 (63.1)	13.0 (55.4)	5.8 (42.4)	0.8 (33.4)	−2.3 (27.9)
Average rainfall mm (inches)	15.0 (0.59)	11.6 (0.46)	16.2 (0.64)	10.7 (0.42)	2.1 (0.08)	0.0 (0.0)	0.0 (0.0)	0.9 (0.04)	0.0 (0.0)	0.6 (0.02)	5.1 (0.20)	21.1 (0.83)	83.3 (3.28)
Average precipitation days	8.7	5.8	9.1	7.3	2.0	0.0	0.1	0.2	0.0	0.3	3.1	7.2	43.8
Average relative humidity (%)	55	49	44	38	27	22	23	30	33	39	47	56	39
Source: Jeddah Regional Climate Center

== See also ==
- List of World Heritage Sites in Saudi Arabia
- Eastern Arabia
- Al-Qarah
- Al-arba' Mountain
