= Raid on Banu Thalabah =

Raid on Banu Thalabah refers to a series of raids on Banu Thalabah. It may refer to:

- First Raid on Banu Thalabah, August, 627 AD in 4th month of 6AH
- Second Raid on Banu Thalabah, August, 627 AD in 4th month of 6AH
- Third Raid on Banu Thalabah, September, 627 AD, 6th month of 6AH
