= Al-Shu'ba Mountain =

Al-Shu'ba Mountain جبل الشعبة
- Location within Saudi Arabia
- Country: Saudi Arabia
- Time zone: UTC+3

Al-Shu'ba mountain located in east of Al-Shu'ba village at Al-Ahsa and to the north of Al-Eskan next to the road leading from eastern villages to the northern villages and to Al-Dammam. Also it extends from north to south with a length of 20 km on the eastern edge of the northern oasis and its width is 4 km.

== Description ==
The mountain is divided to two parts: northern part and southern part and it forms a protective factor between the oasis and the sands sea which is behind it from the east. It descends to the northwest of Al-Jarn village.

The height of Al-Shu'ba mountain is about 246 above sea level. The two parts of the mountain are separated by a 600-metre-wide aperture, in addition, the mountain overlook to the oasis from the western side, and from the eastern side it overlooks the desert and the site of Jawatha Mosque. It is noticeable that in the summer, families spend time there to enjoy the sunset views. Due to ease of its slope, cars can go up to high levels with the possibility of camping.

== Ramadan ==
During Ramadan, young men practice sand climbing, two hours before the Eftar, where more than 150 cars congregate on the mountain to do that, and there are a lot of motorcycles. It is a destination of young boys on vacations. The mountain is the main facade of the village and it is only known by the name of its mountain.

== See also ==
- Al-Qarah Mountain (Saudi Arabia)
- Al-arba' Mountain
