= Rumailah, Saudi Arabia =

Village in Saudi Arabia

Coordinates: 25.413°N 49.729°E

Rumailah (Arabic: الرميلة) is a small village in Saudi Arabia on the eastern side of Al-Ahsa, one of the villages administered from Omran. It had a population of 9,741 at the 2022 census. It is bordered by Omran, Murkaz, Dalwa and Huta. It is 350 km from Riyadh.

There are eight mosques in Rumailah and five Hussainyahs. The major mosque is AlZahrah mosque, built in the 2nd century after the Hijrah. There are many crops grown in Rumailah such as grapes, bananas, lemons, cantaloupes, papayas, watermelons, dates, lettuce, zucchini, radishes, celery, parsley, tomatoes, onions and pomegranates.
