= Al-Jafr =

Al-Jafr may refer to:

- Al-Jafr, Saudi Arabia
- Al-Jafr, Jordan
  - Al Jafr prison
- Al-Jafr (book), a mystical Shia holy book

== See also ==
- Jafr, Rasht District, Tajikistan
