= Al-Qarah Mountain (Saudi Arabia) =

Mountain in Eastern Province, Saudi Arabia

Al-Qarah Mountain Jabal Al-Qārah (جَبَل ٱلْقَارَة)
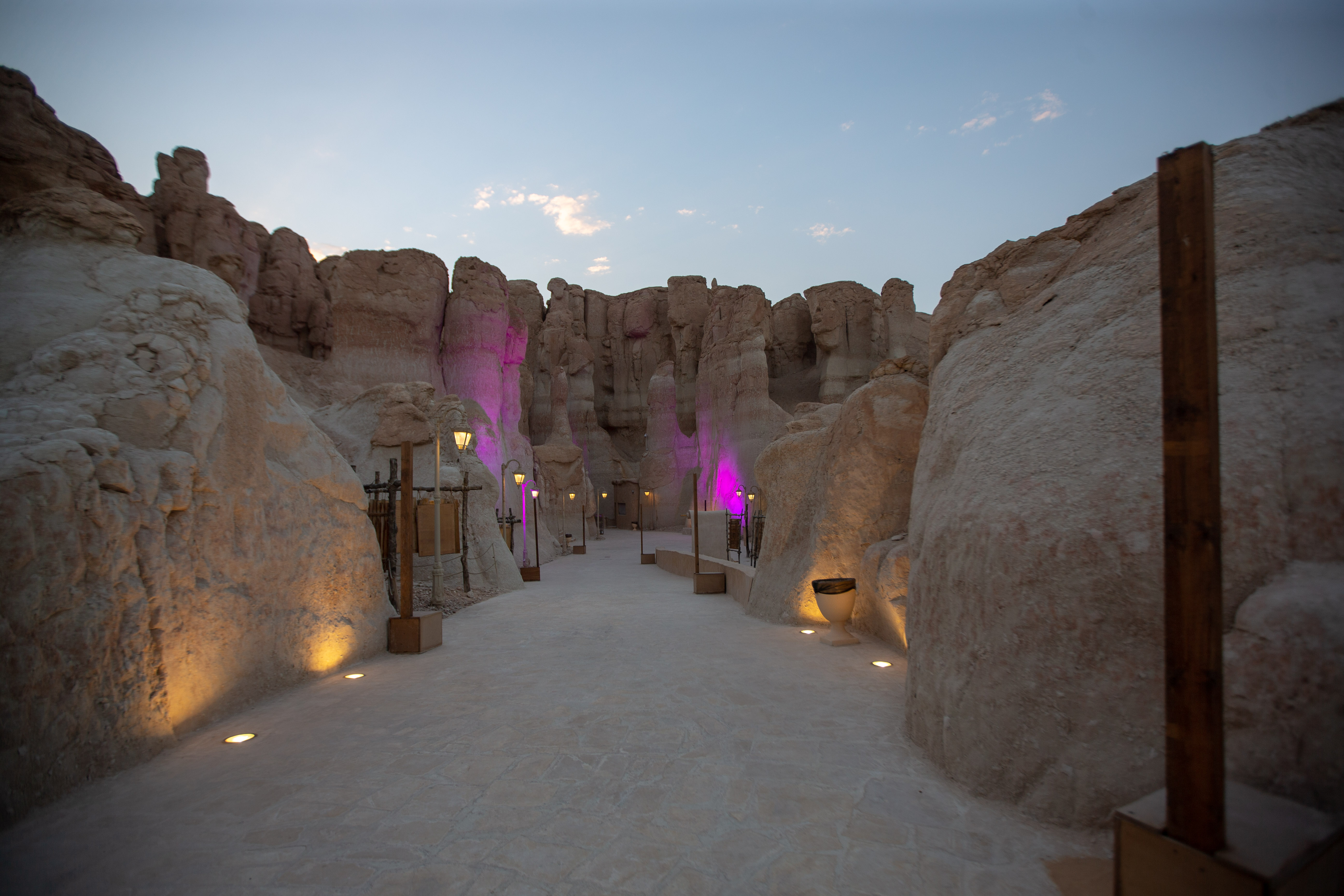
- Location in Saudi Arabia

- Location within Saudi Arabia Location within Persian Gulf
- Country: Saudi Arabia
- Province: Eastern Province
- City: Hofuf

Government
  - Governor: Badr Bin Muhammad Bin Abdullah Bin Jalawi Al Saud
- Time zone: UTC+3

Al-Qarah Mountain or Jabal Al-Qārah (Arabic: جَبَل ٱلْقَارَة), also known as Al-Shabaab Mountain, is a mesa of 75 metres (246 feet) in Al-Ahsa, in the Eastern Province of Saudi Arabia. This mountain counts as one of the most important natural sights in Al-Ahsa, and was registered in the UNESCO world heritage center's list in 2018, after the inclusion of Al-Ahsa Oasis. It is located 15 kilometres (9.3 miles) to the northeast of Al-Hofuf. Some of its caves, such as "Al-Nashab", have moderately steady temperatures throughout the year.

== Naming ==
The mountain is named after the village of Al-Qarah. It is also sometimes called "Al-Shaba'an", because it is situated among palm trees and rivers, and it has wild high caves which are cold in the summer. It is likely that the first inhabitants of Al-Qarah village were a pre-Islamic tribe who were skilled at archery. However, it appears from the site's landform that it was referred to as a "black, small, single, round and high mountain." Moreover, some historians and travelers stated in their books that the mountain was called "Al-Mushaqqar". However, in his book "Geographical Dictionary of Saudi Arabia - Eastern Province - Section Four", the historian Hamad Al-Jassir mentioned different opinions about the location of Al-Mushaqqar, with some having said that "Al-Mushaqqar" was in Al-Hijaz, in the valley of Eja'a, one of the Tae'a Mountains, or in a Bahraini fort, and the last one is most popular. While Abdul-Khaleq Al-Janbi confirmed that Al-Qarah was named by that, because its south is connected to a huge, strange shape, and a hill formation with caves of various sizes, there is also a big rock above it, and it is carved in an unusual way. In total, it has three heads, the first one is to south, and it looks like a woman's head. The second one is to the north, and looks like a man's head. The third one between them looks like a lion. This part of the mountain is called "Ra'as Al-Qarah", as mentioned by Arabic geographers. Al-Janbi said in his book that it was "a divine formation", which was not influenced by human activity. "Al-Mushaqqar" was also mentioned in the fourth section of "Mou'jam Ma Esta'ajam", a dictionary by Abu Ubaid Al-Bakri. Ibn Al-E'erabi said "Al-Mushaqqar: a great ancient city, has a fortress in the middle, on Al-Qarah called Attalah, and on the top of it, there is a well that has a hole, until it gets to the ground, so it is absorbed by the ground. All Hajer water is excluded in that well, in its increasing ..."

== Geographical location ==
The mountain is located in Al-Ahsa Oasis, between four villages: Al-Qarah, At-Tuwaitheer, Ad-Dalwah and At-Tihemeah.

== Geology ==
The mountain's base area is about 14 km^{2} (5.4 sq mi), and consists of reddish colored sedimentary rocks. Also, the caves' temperature is semi-steady and moderate along the year, hovering around 20 °C (68 °F), accompanied by a gentle and cool airflow from the cave's interior to its exterior. It is also consisted of limestone, sandstone, marlstone and siltstone, while the uncovered base of the mountain is composed of a thin layer of marlstone, topped with a layer of Breccias rocks, up to 17 m (56 ft), followed by limestone and sandstone with a thickness of 18 m (59 ft), after which there is are 75 m (246 ft) of sequential layers of grey crumbling sandstone, with intermittent layers of red marl and marl-alluvial, and it ends up with a cover of 2 m (6.6 ft) of limestone. Several types of the mountain's caves extend in a form of ribbed grids of cracked ground, while the others are cavities due to chemical weathering, the process of abrasion, and collapses.

== Caves and cavities ==
There is a popular belief that the caves in the mountain formed as a result of tides, based on a study that was done in 1978, however, in 2006 another study denied this allegation.

There are 3 types of caves in the mountain:

- First type formed due to the dissolving and abrasion process of water-soluble rocks, and it is the most common type of limestone cave detected in Saudi Arabia.
- Second type is a result of collapses of the upper layers because of chemical weathering and abrasion, therefore, the removal of lower layers lead to the formation of wide caves sometimes. The most famous cave of this type is located at the west of the mountain, and it is called "Al-Eid Cave", or "Maqarat Al-Eid", in which the events accompanying with collective wedding take a place there, and it are held annually.
- Third type is formed because of earthquake Fissures and it is a cavernous system that takes a regular form of straight fissures, and corridors like. The number of these straight corridors reaches 28, with a length of 1.5 km (0.93 mi).

The most famous cave of this type is Al-Nashab cave which has been invested by Ahsa Tourism company under the name "Land of Civilizations project in Al-Qarah mountain". Each one of the caves has natural characteristics which made the locals take advantage of it based on their usage like the annual collective wedding, and other activities for tourists. The most famous caves in the mountain are:

- Bu Saleh (Al-Mahdi)
- Al-Eid
- An-Naqa
- Al-Mua'adhamah
- Al-Maheub
- Al-Gairan
- An-Nashab
- Um Al-Jamajem

== Land of Civilizations Museum ==
Until 2016, Al-Qarah was one of the responsibilities of Al ahsa municipality, despite the useless repeated attempts to register it at the list of UNESCO world heritage centre. After that, Ahsa Tourism company "Ahsana" invested the mountain to develop it as a modern tourist facility. The tourism projects' cost which was done by the company was about 100 million Saudi Riyal. The project named "Land of Civilizations" included preparing the main cave, lighting and leveling its ground. It also includes the museum of history of Hajer "Al Ahsa name formerly", stepped theater, new cafes, and shops. This contributed to holding weekly activates, between cultural evenings, music, arts, and visual shows.

Land of Civilizations is an open-air Natural Geological Museum offering insight into the mountain’s significance. It explains that Al-Qarah Mountain was shaped by the forces of tectonic fractureing and surface weathering causing straight corridors. The mountain contains red layers of Rhizocretions, fossilized remains of ancient plant roots, indicating dense mangrove forests thriving along this area millions of years ago.

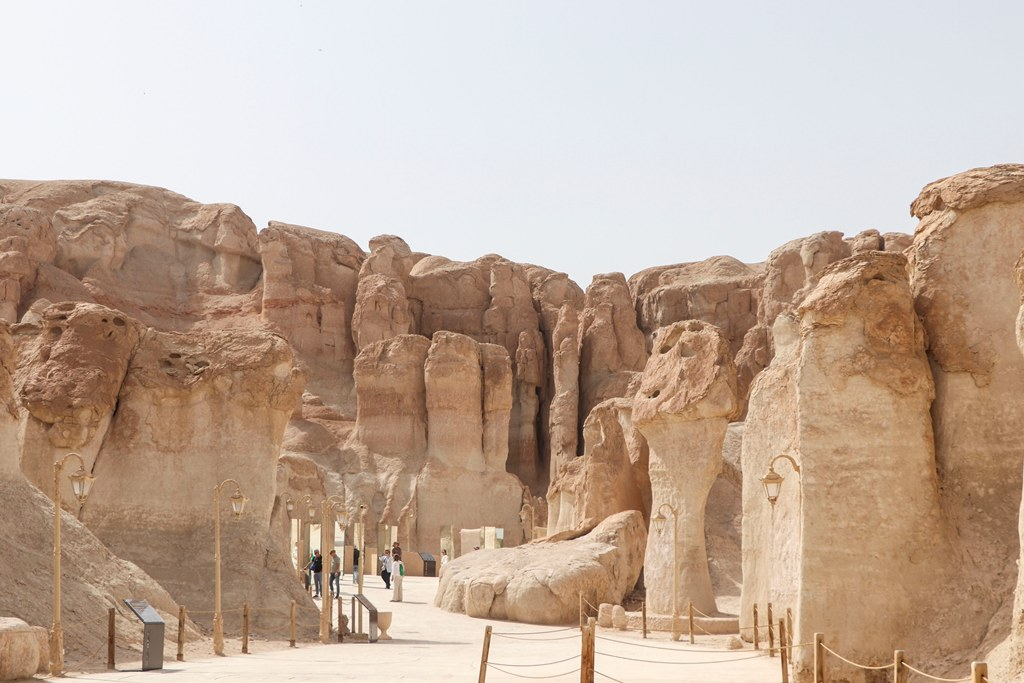
Entrance

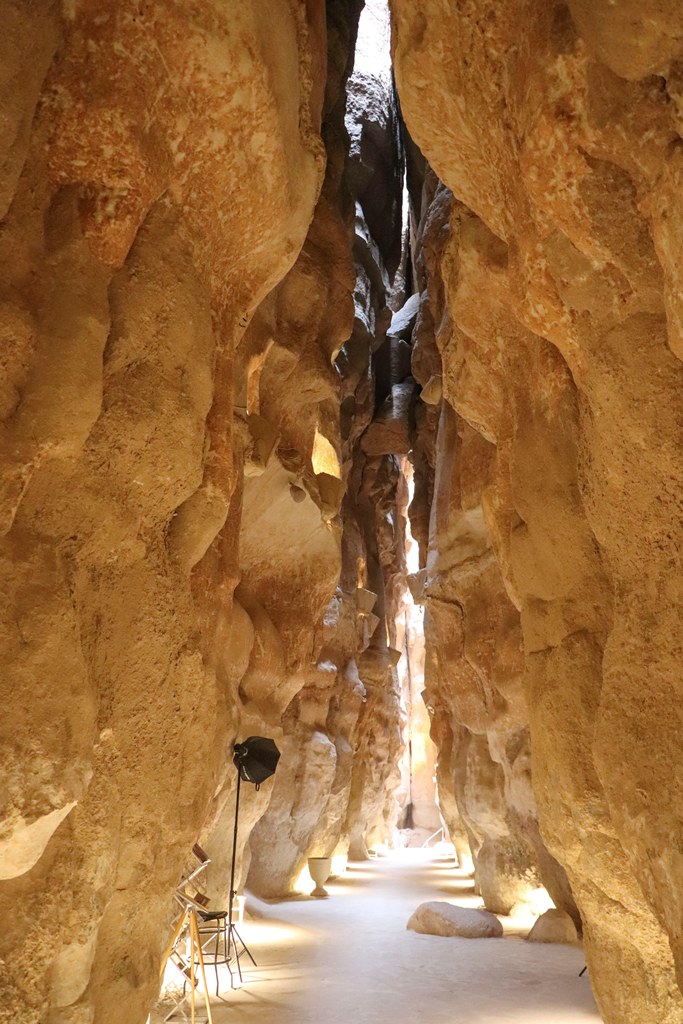
Straight corridor

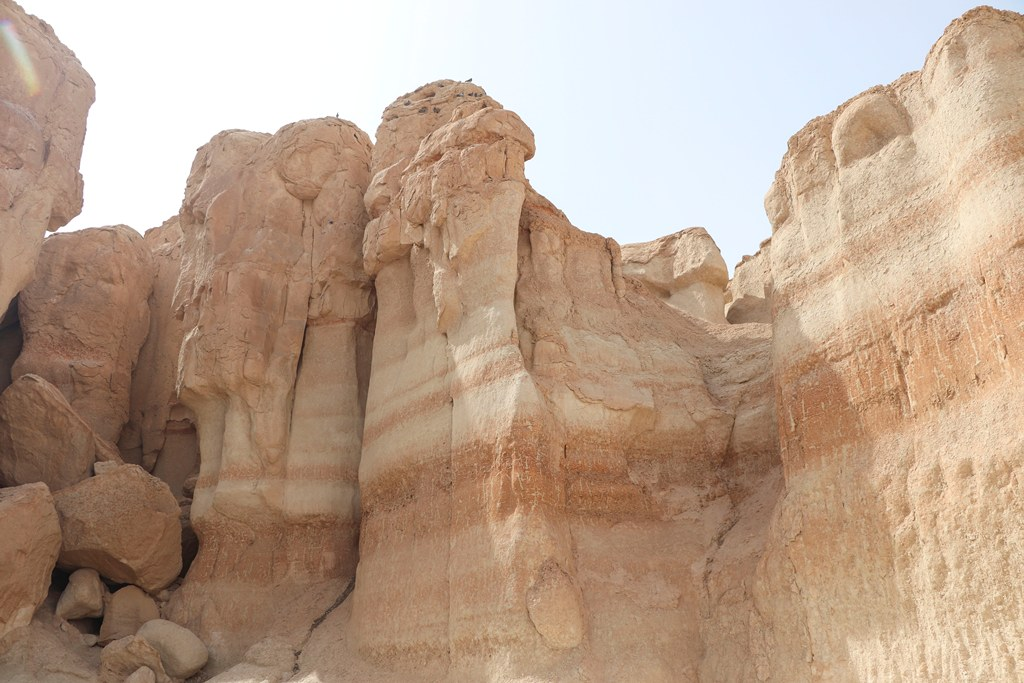
Red layer of Rhizocretions

== Climate ==
Some of the caves are characterized by moderate temperatures, which are relatively constant throughout the year, at 21–23 °C (70–73 °F), compared to the temperature outside the cave or at its outer surface, which gives the feeling that inside the cave is warmer during winter, even though it is the same temperature during summer. The reason for the regular temperature is the thermal insulation of the rocks and the caves are not exposed to direct sun. Also, due to cool airflow, there is a difference in temperature between inside and outside of the cave.

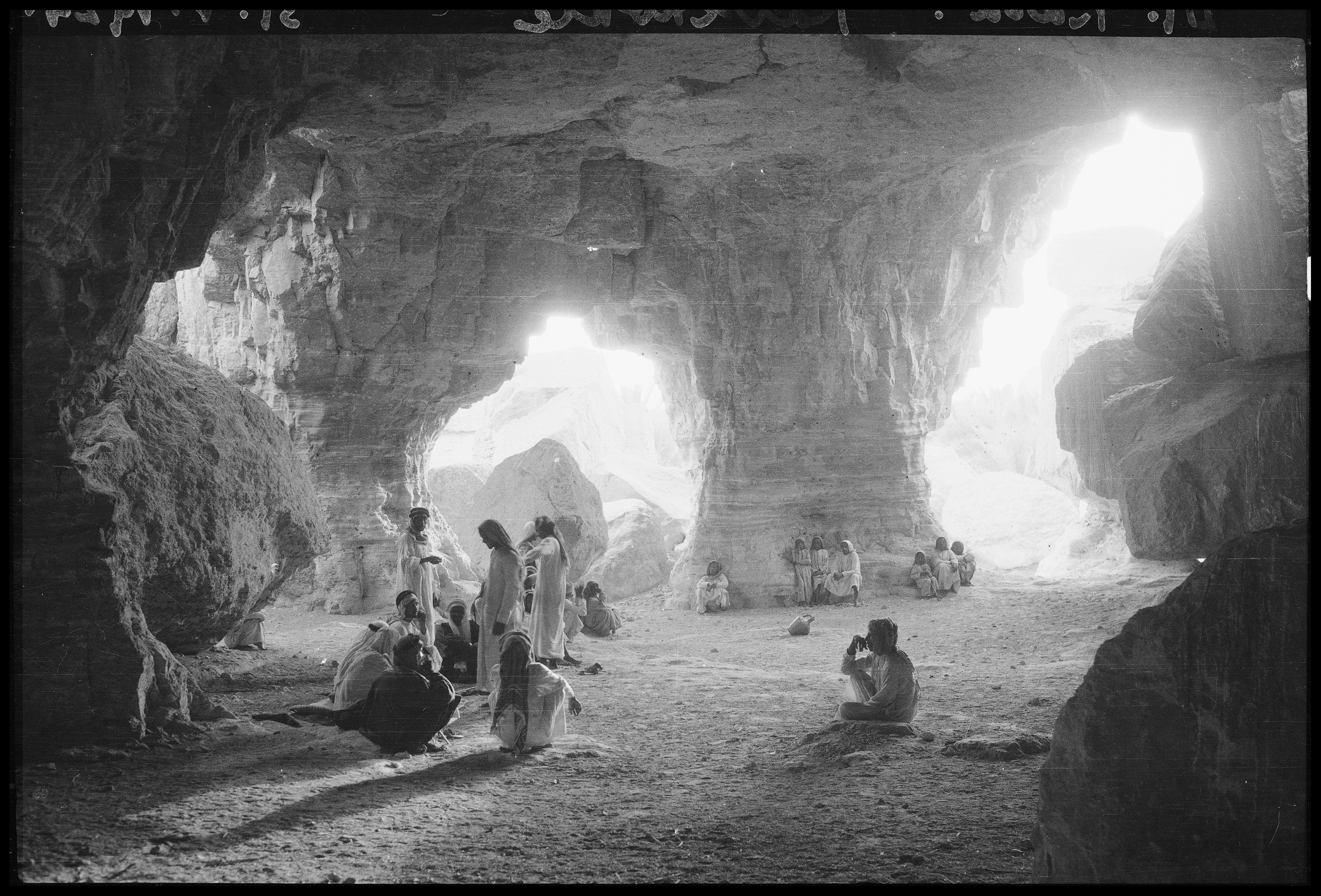
People inside Al-Qarah Mountain, 1924 A.D.

== History ==
The mountain was inhabited by the tribe of Bani Muhareb from Abd al-Qays till the third century in the Hijri calendar (the ninth century in the Gregorian calendar). Because of the different terrain of each cave, the caves used by the residents in the past and until now like Al-Eid Cave for weddings, Al-Nashab cave for tourism, and Um Al-Jamajem cave which recently used for hiking trips since the end of 2019.

== Education ==
The caves were used as a place for education before the Formal education, so the teachers were gathering the children at the courtyards of the mountain or at the entrances of the caves, to teach them reading Al-Qur’an One of the habits that were popular in the past, that the people of close villages were burying their special documents in the mountain, so the mountain has a lot of valuable documents and the histories of some families of Al-Ahsa.

== Pottery works ==
On the west side of the mountain is a pottery works, established some 600 years ago by Dugha al-Gharāsh (دوغة الغراش) and still operated by his descendants. 'Ali b. Husayn b. Haytham al-Gharash is regarded as the most accomplished craftsman of the Dugha, passing the art to his sons and grandsons. The pottery was fired in pit kilns and made from a porous white earthenware, the vessels traditionally used to store and cool water. The clay was collected at 'Ain al-Hāra, about 12 km west of the pottery caves in Al-Mubarraz.
