= Sahood Fort =

Fort near Al Mubarraz

Coordinates: 25°24′45″N 49°35′03″E

- قصر صاهود (Arabic)
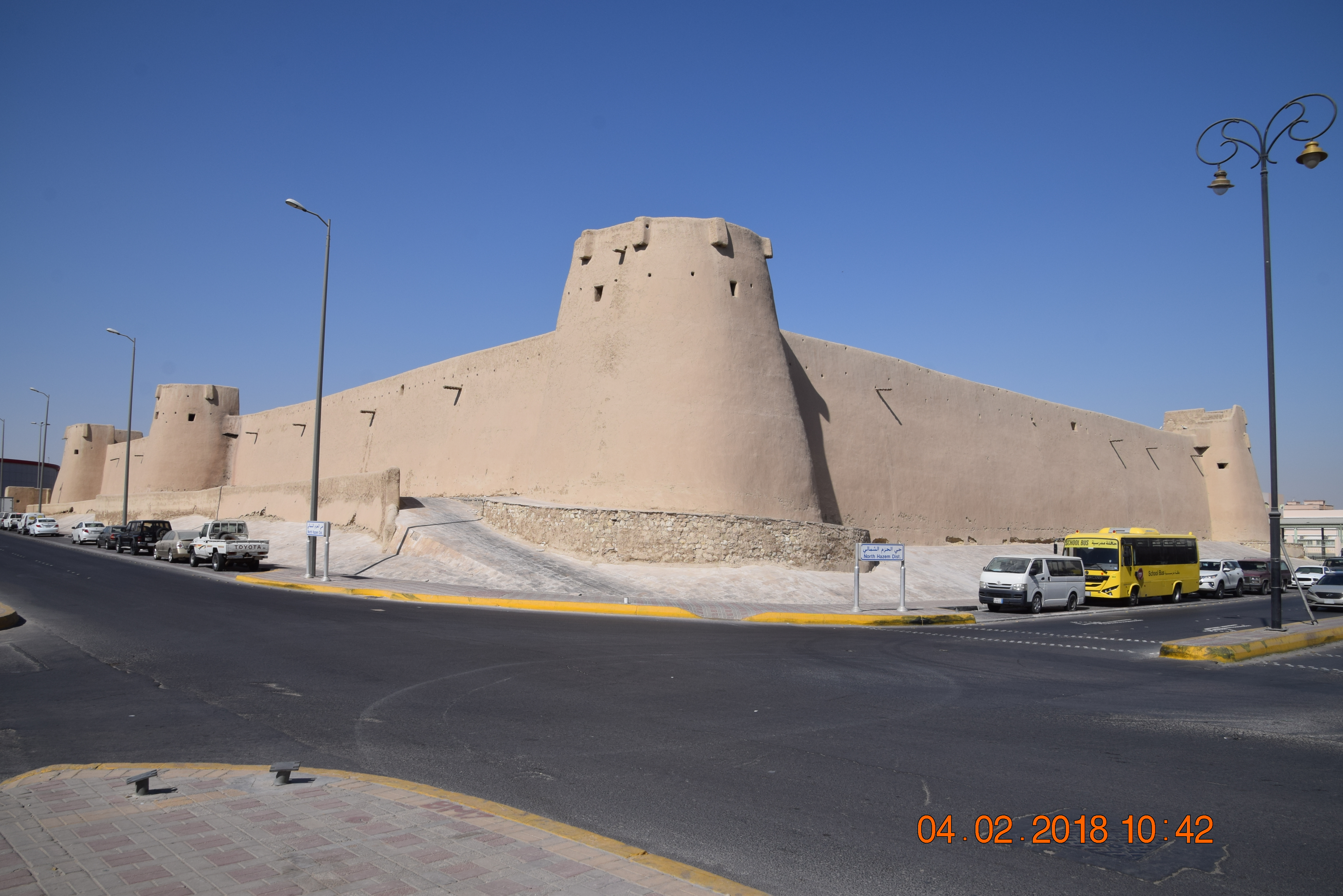
- Interactive map of Sahood Fort
- Type: Fort
- Location: Al-Mubarraz, Saudi Arabia

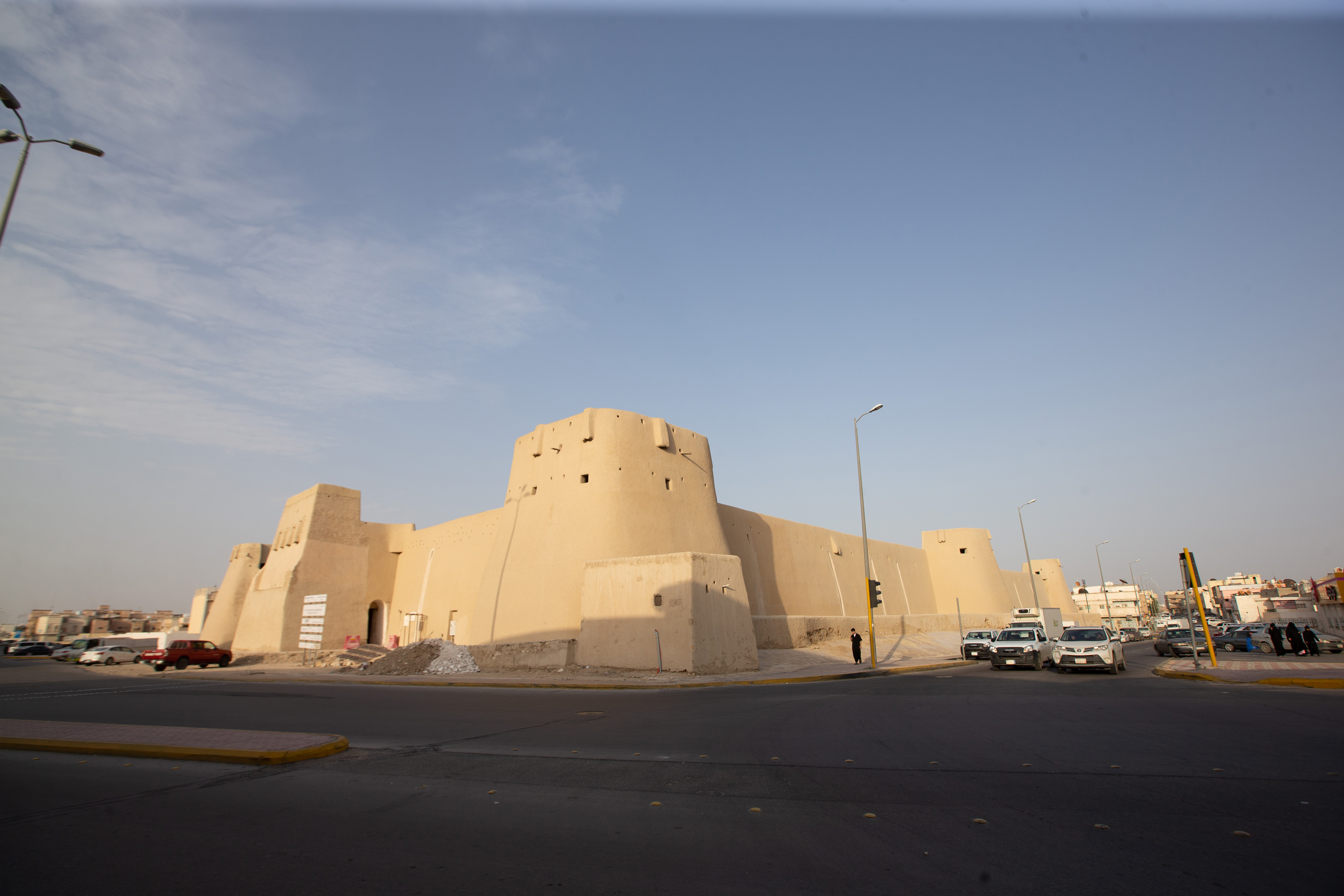
Photo of the fort taken on 9 February 2019

Sahood Fort (Arabic: قصر صاهود) is situated outside the western walls of Al Mubarraz, Saudi Arabia. The fort is used as barracks for the Saudi Arabian Armed Forces.

== Construction ==
The walls and towers of the fort are built with mud bricks on two-layered bases—internal and external—and connected by palm trunks. The void between the layers of the walls was filled with mud and grit, offering multiple layers of defense. Slots were created in the walls to hold cannons, offering even more defense against intruders. Towers are connected directly to the walls for ease of surveillance. Each tower of the fort consists of two floors that ascend internally. There is a deep trench in the exterior part that makes it difficult for enemies to breach the fort.

The main entrance of the fort is on its western side, facing the Al Hazm suburbs. It was designed to follow the Bent entrance system with a square-shaped surveillance room situated directly above the main entrance which also housed the soldiers' room. A storehouse and well were built on the southeastern side of the main entrance, fulfilling the water requirements at the fort. A square-shaped room to the northern side of its entrance contains a rectangular shaped mosque with a niche and tribune supported by five pillars each with four rings. A divan can also be found at the southeastern side of the fort, beside the well. The horse stables were built on the northwestern side, while bathrooms were built along the northern walls.

The fort's founder is unknown, though some historical sources state that it was built in the late seventeenth century, according to the Hijri calendar. The first people to settle there were the Bani Khaled tribe. They appointed Al Mubarraz as Al-Ahsa Governorate Al-Ahsa Capital during the reign of their Prince, Barrack, who expelled the Turks from Al-Ahsa in 1082 of the Hijri calendar. Other historians refer to Saud bin Abdul-Aziz bin Muhammad bin Saud Imam Saud Bin Abdul Aziz as the fort's founder in the second decade of the 13th century of the calendar.

== See also ==
- Masmak Fort
- Barzan Palace
