= Al Hafayer =

Coordinates: 23.126496°N 48.968975°E

Al Hafayer is a small village and Markaz in Al Ahsa region of Eastern Province in Saudi Arabia And there is one small primary school.
