= Qasr Ibrahim =

Historic fort in Saudi Arabia

Coordinates: 25.3789°N 49.5868°E

- قصر إبراهيم
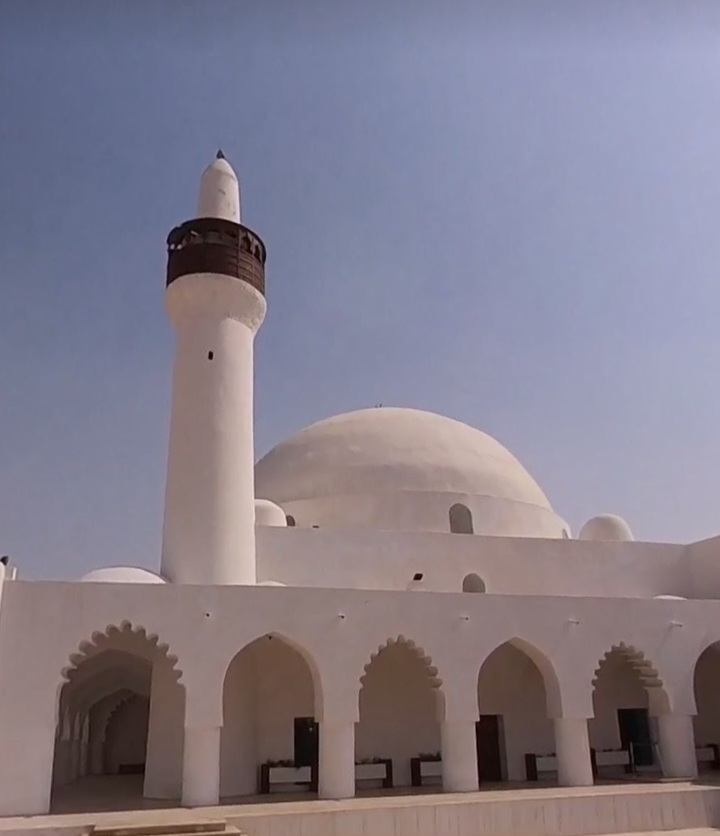

General information
- Type: 1555
- Location: Hofuf, Al-Ahsa, Eastern Province, Saudi Arabia
- Construction started: 1555

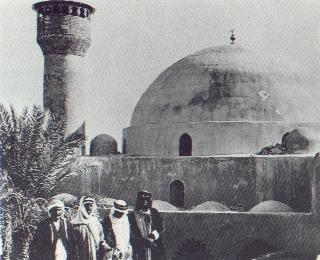
Old photograph of Ibrahim Palace

Qasr Ibrahim (Arabic: قصر إبراهيم, romanized: Qaṣr ʾibrāhīm, lit. 'Ibrahim's Palace') is a historic fort in the north of Alqoat neighborhood, Hofuf, Al-Ahsa, Eastern Province, Saudi Arabia. It is also called the Dome Palace, AlQoat Palace or Ibrahim Castle and is the region's main architectural heritage site from the Ottoman period. It served as an Ottoman military base. It was seized by King Abdul-Aziz Al Saud on April 13, 1913 (5th of First Jumada 1331 AH).

The palace was constructed with a mosque that has a dome in 1555 (963 AH). During the next century, the palace was enlarged into a castle, prison and hammam. In 2019, the Saudi Commission for Tourism and National Heritage has announced that the procedures of renovation of all parts of the palace have finished. This restoration process included rebuilding the fallen parts, painting the buildings and preparing a main square for the tourism activities and festivals.

== History ==
It was built in 1556 by Ali Ibn Ahmed Ibn Lawand Al-Burayki, the Ottoman governor of the time. The castle was renovated in 1801 by the Saudi governor Ibrahim Ibn ‘Ufaysan. Several historians believe that the castle was named after him.

== Architecture ==
It is considered as one of the major architectural masterpieces in Alhasa and it combines Islamic and military architecture.

== The description of the palace ==
Ibrahim Palace covers an area of 16500 square meters. Moreover, it is characterized by an architectural style that blends the Islamic and military features with the traditional architecture styles of Al-Ahsa region. Those styles are exhibited in the arcs, domes and ornamental designs.

The architecture styles of the palace consist of two features:

- Islamic style: This style can be seen in semi-circular arches, Islamic domes and the mihrab of the mosque. Regarding the minaret, it is made of stone and influenced from Turkish designs. It is a high minaret and has a spiral staircase.
- Military style: This is represented by the huge towers that surround the palace, and the residential soldiers barracks as well, which is located in the east of the palace and horse stables.

The construction of the palace was constructed based on local materials. While its walls were made of mud mixed with straw, the ceilings were made of palm trunks, sandalwood and stones.

The palace is square with a long fence and towers in the corners. The palace was provided with a group of observation windows, in which soldiers can look at the bottom of the fence.

== UNESCO Site ==
In 2018, Al-Ahsa Oasis became the fifth Saudi site to be registered on the UNESCO world heritage. Qasr Ibrahim Mosque was included as one of the 12 sites in the Cultural Landscape of Al-Ahsa Oasis.

== See also ==
- List of castles in Saudi Arabia
