= Al-Qaisaryah Market =

Traditional market in Hofuf

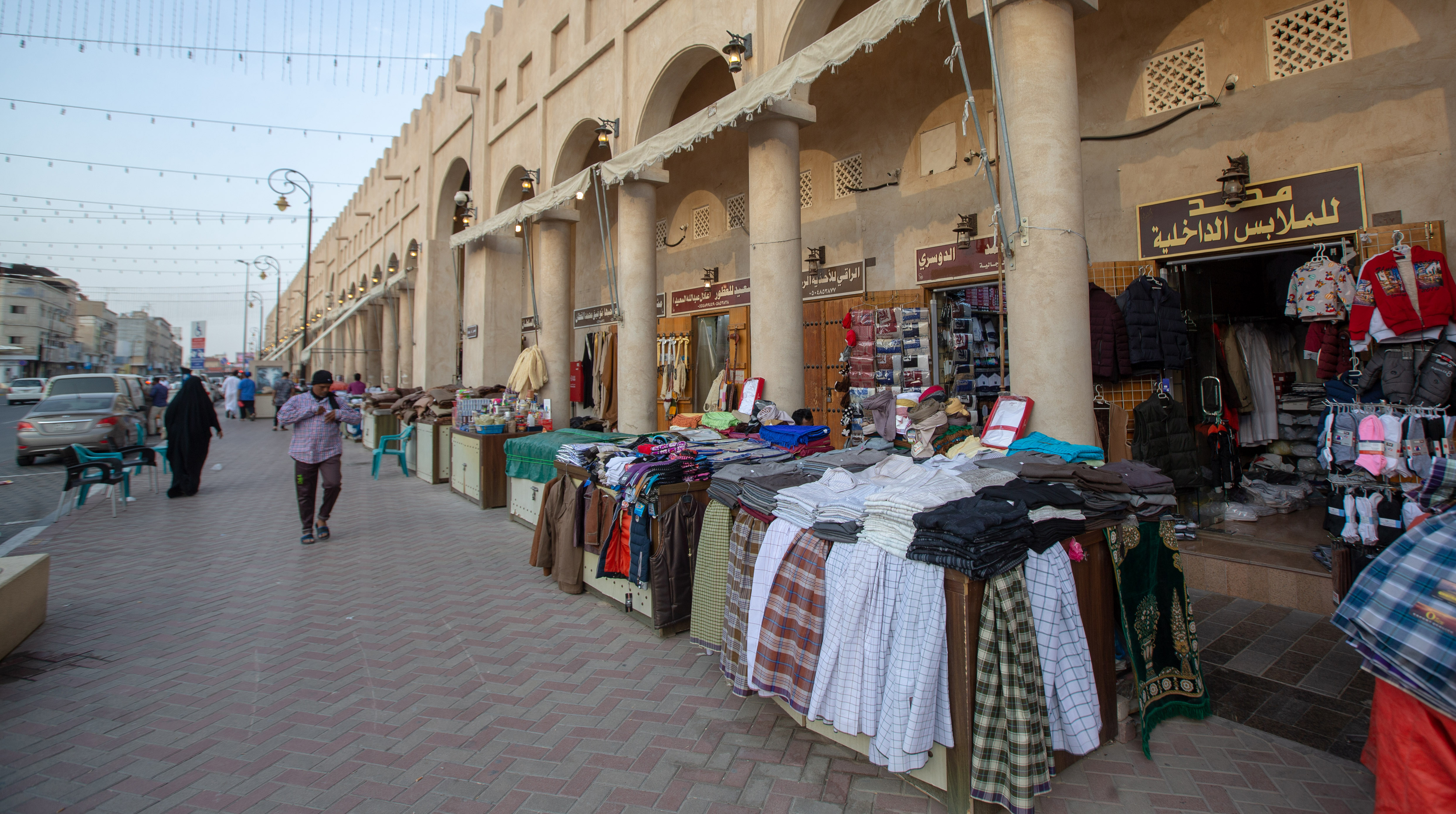
- Location: Hofuf, Saudi Arabia; 25°22′33″N 49°35′20.12″E
- Interactive map of Al-Qaisaryah Market

Al-Qaisaryah market is a historic market located in the Al-Rafa'ah district in Al-Ahsa, east of Saudi Arabia. It is one of the 12 locations of the UNESCO World Heritage Site Al-Ahsa Oasis.

== Location and history ==
Al-Qaisaryah market is located in the center of Al-Hofuf, on the western side of Al-Rafa'ah district and directly opened onto a wide street that runs through the city center from the north to the south.

The oldest description of the market was provided by the English traveler William Belgrave who visited the city of Al-Hofuf in 1852. Also, the market was damaged due to a massive fire that broke out on Thursday, October 18, 2001, this fire destroyed 80% of the market.

=== Building stages ===
- It was built in stages that date back to the days of the algebraic state 1392–1524.
- It was expanded at the beginnings of the first Ottoman period 1524–1550
- The last renewal for some parts of the western side of the market was during the first years of the entry of King Abdul-Aziz bin Abdul Rahman Al Saud to Al-Ahssa between the years 1918–1923.

== Structure ==
- Rectangular building consisting of one floor 80×160 m, and considered as is the oldest model for the authentic Arab market, The internal market layout is on The Grid Form, and it includes 422 shops on adjacent rows on both sides of the covered corridors. The facade of the western side of the market is preceded by a long arcade that opens on the main street through a long row of semi-circular contracts resting on rectangular columns.
- The current market has 14 entries distributed across the three market fronts. These entries lead to covered corridors that cross the market, the width of these corridors ranges between 2.5 and 3.5 m, while the main entrances to the market are in its western facade.

=== Exhibits ===
- The traditional Arab's clothes, including men's cloaks embroidered with gold thread, types of gowns and head covers (hijabs).
- Traditional handicrafts and heritage collectibles.
- Aromatic products and medicinal plants.
- Kinds of grains, coffee and all food.

== Gallery ==
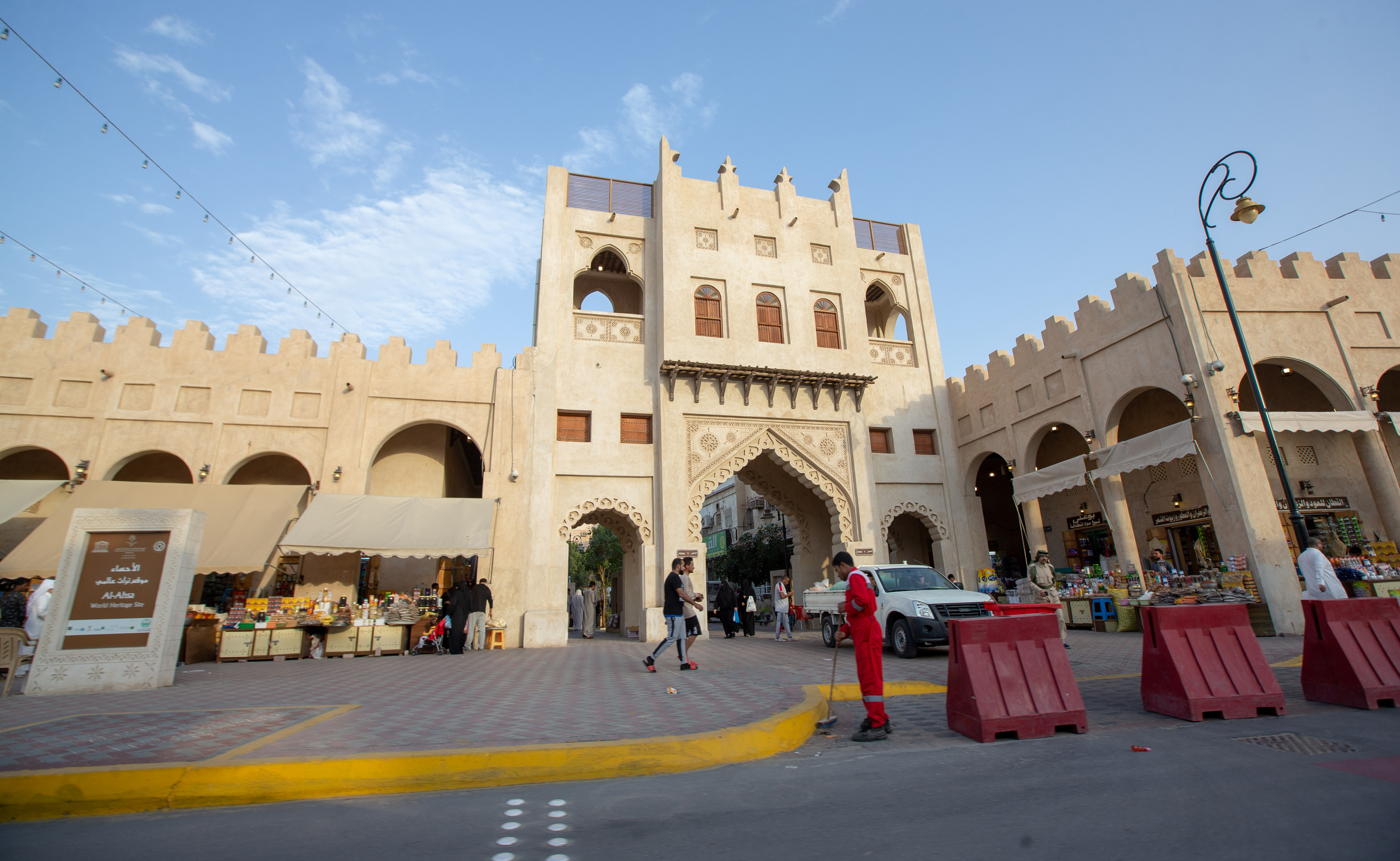

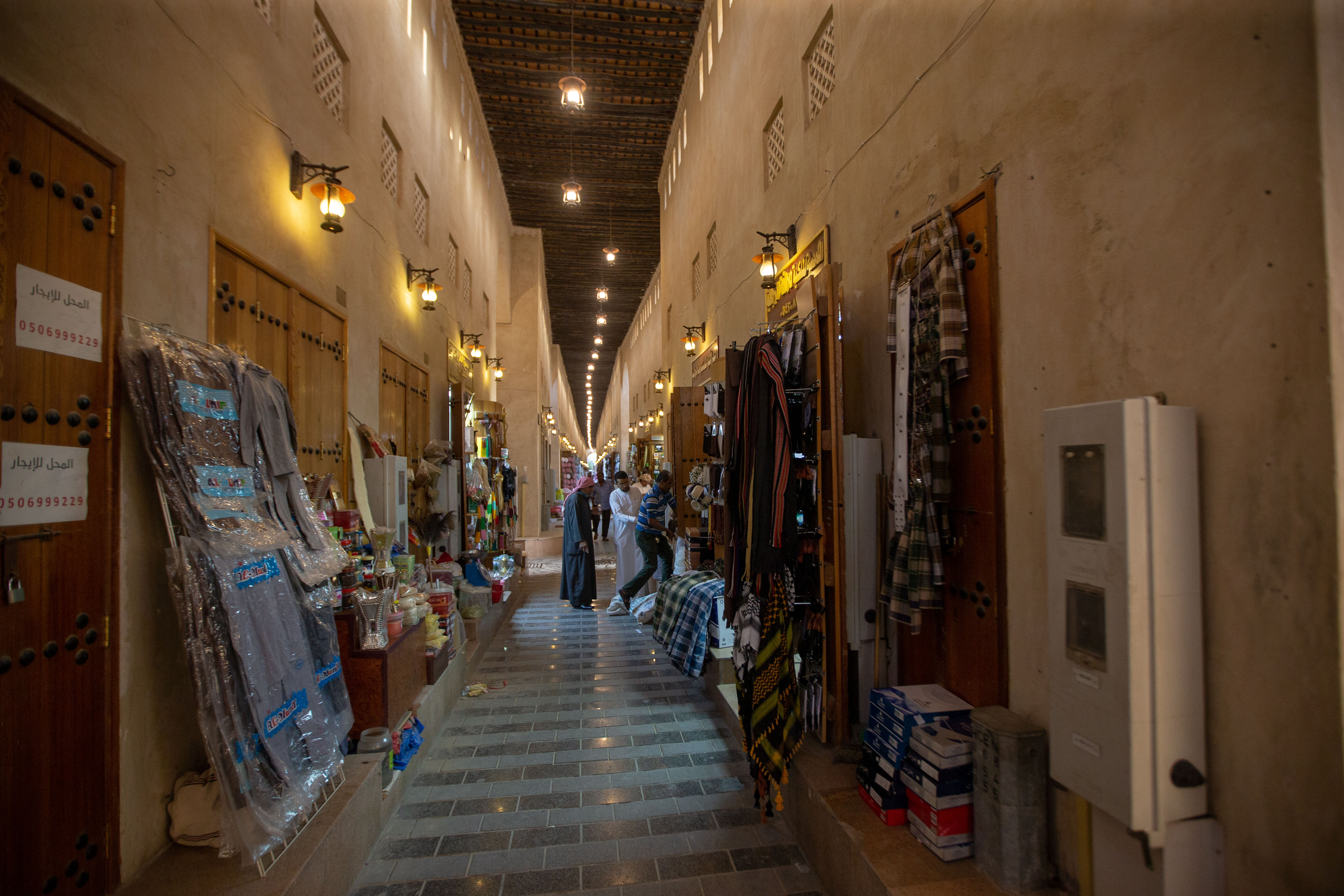

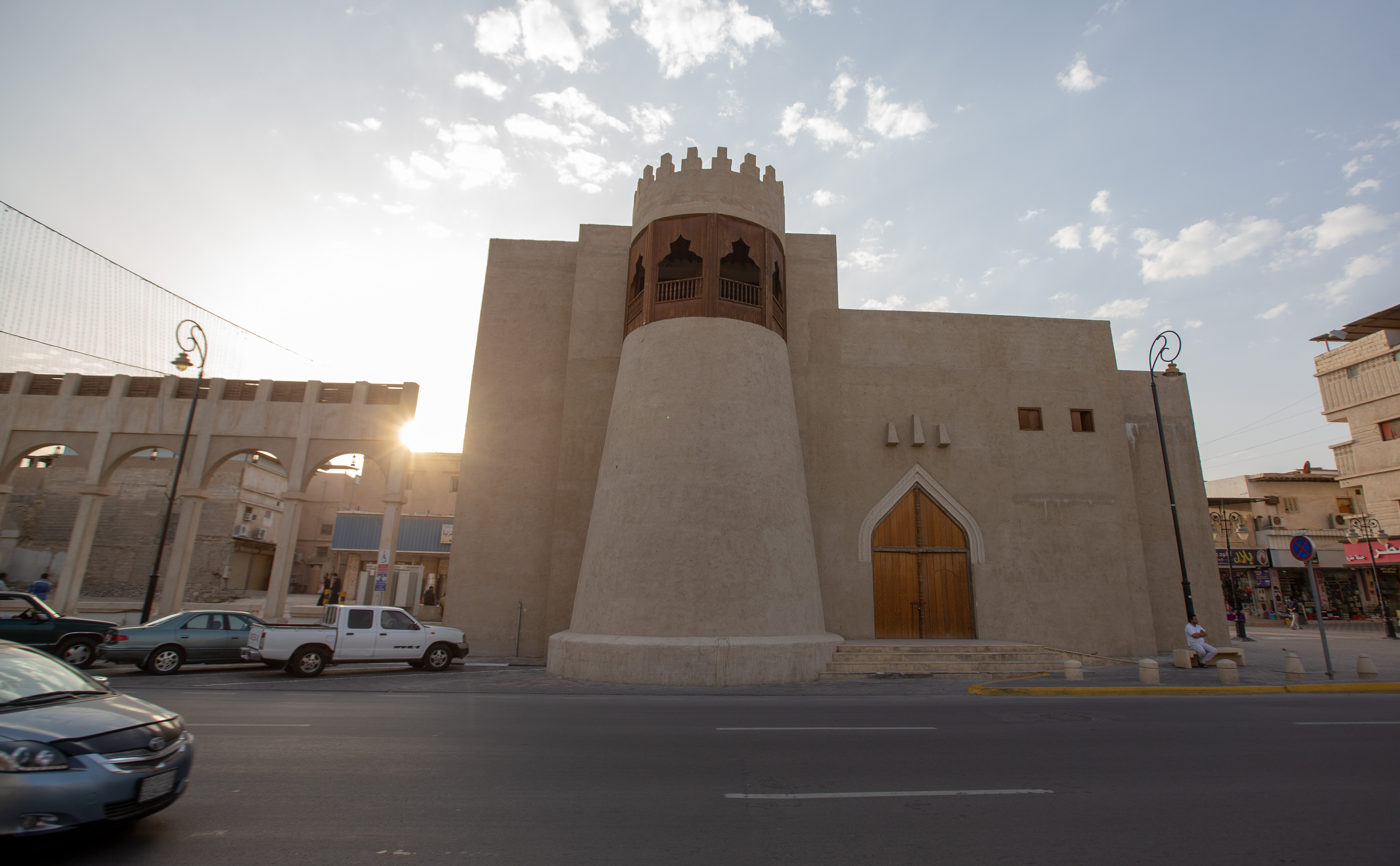

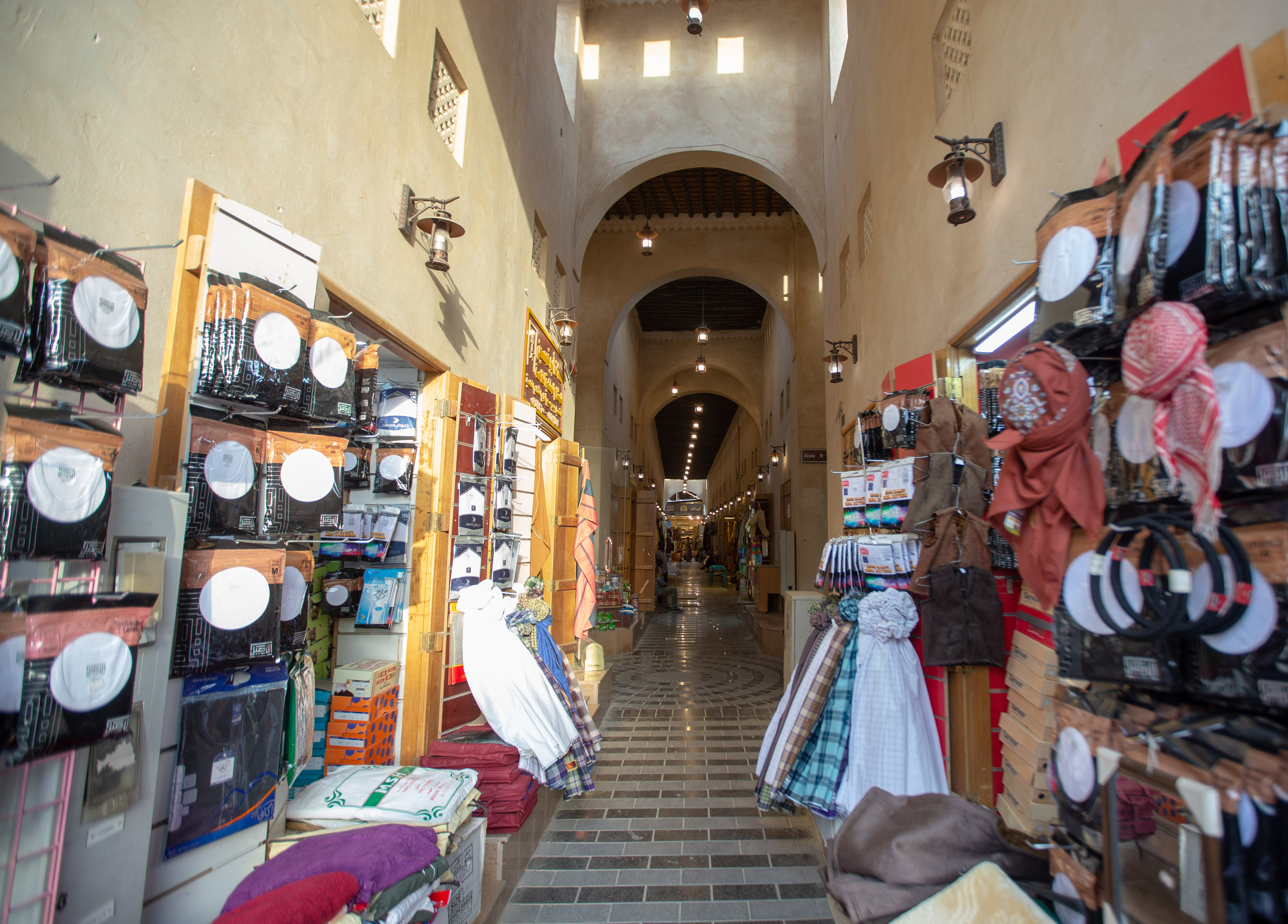

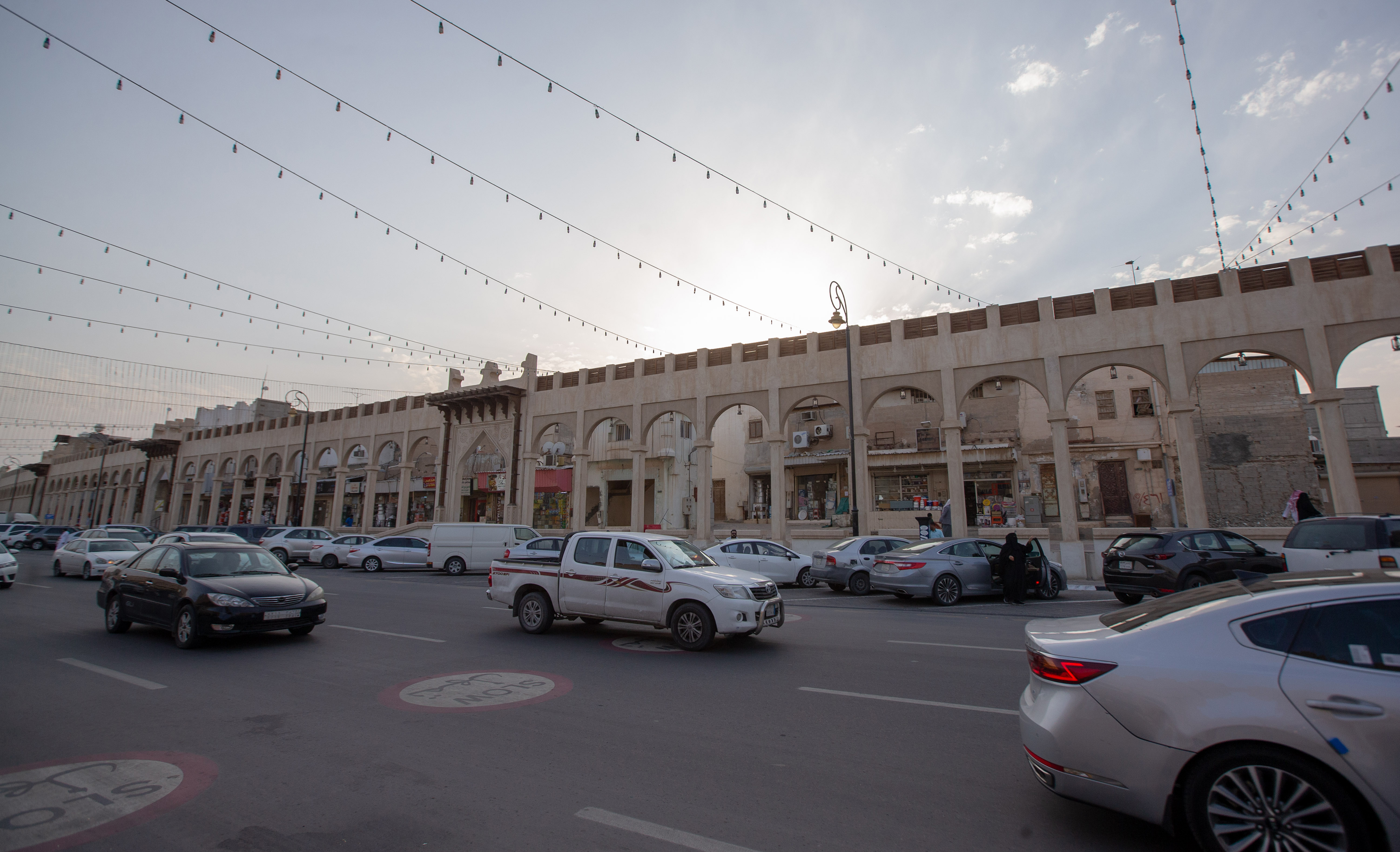
