= Jawatha Mosque =

Mosque in Saudi Arabia

- Arabic: مَسْجِد جَوَاثَا
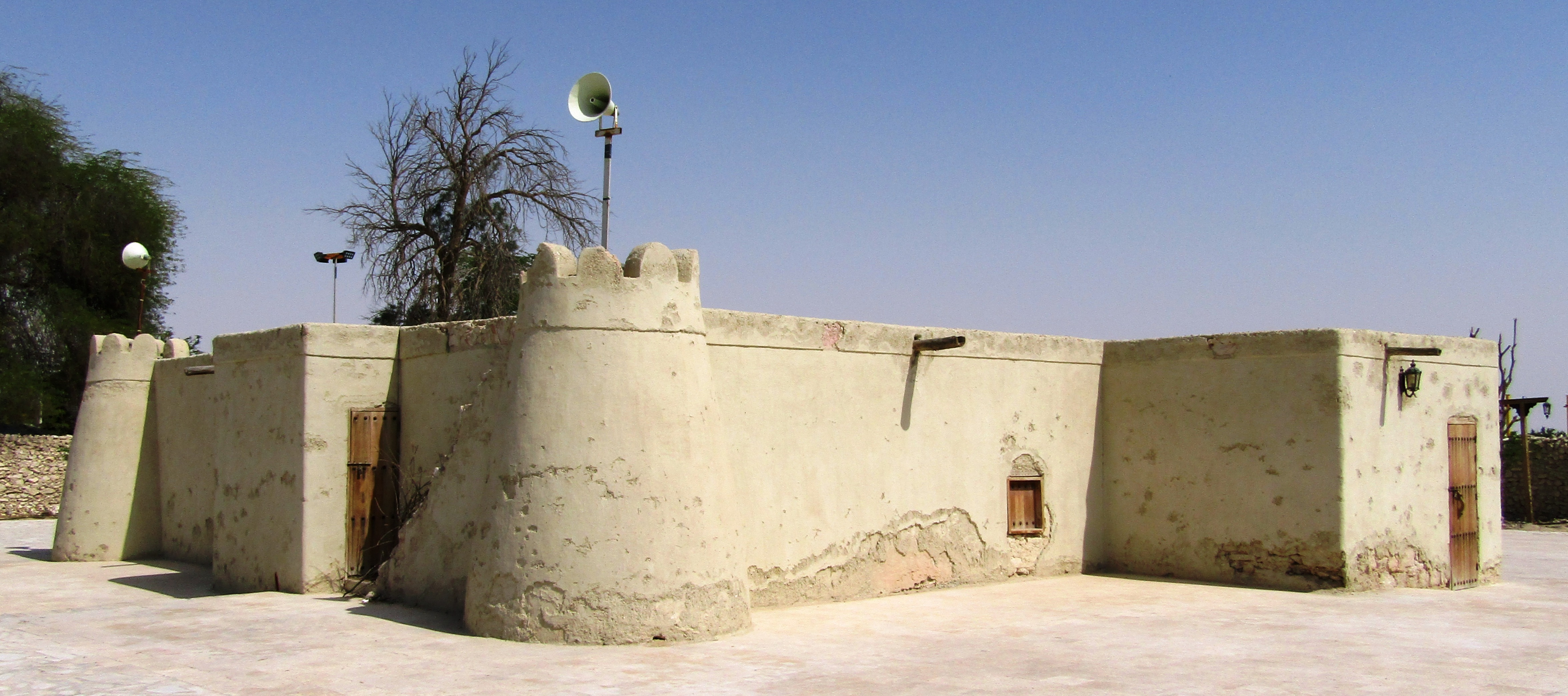

- Location within Saudi Arabia

Religion
- Affiliation: Sunni Islam
- Ecclesiastical or organisational status: Mosque
- Status: Active

Location
- Location: Al-Ahsa, Eastern Province
- Country: Saudi Arabia
- Coordinates: 25°28′11″N 49°40′43″E

Architecture
- Type: Mosque architecture
- Completed: 7 AH (628/629 CE) to 16 AH (637/638 CE); 2007 (restoration)
- UNESCO World Heritage Site
- Type: Cultural
- Criteria: iii, iv, v
- Designated: 2018
- Parent listing: Al-Ahsa Oasis, an Evolving Cultural Landscape
- Reference no.: 1563-009

The Jawatha Mosque (Arabic: مَسْجِد جَوَاثَا, romanized: Masjid Jawāthā), also incorrectly spelled Al-Jawan, is a Sunni Islam mosque, located in the historic Jawatha area, about 12 km (7.5 miles) northeast of Hofuf, Al-Ahsa, Saudi Arabia. It was the earliest known mosque built in eastern Arabia. Most of the original structure fell into ruins. However, it was restored in 2007 by the Saudi Commission for Tourism and National Heritage, using a design similar to that of Masmak Fort in Riyadh.

== Construction ==
Sources give the date of the mosque's original construction as either 7 AH (628/629 CE) or 16 AH (637/638 CE). It was built by the Bani Abd al-Qays tribe, which lived there before and during the early Islamic period. This mosque is believed to be the first mosque built in Eastern Province and where the second Friday congregation prayer in Islam was offered, the first being held in the Prophet's Mosque in Medina. According to legend, when the Hajr Al-Aswad (Black Stone) was stolen from Mecca by the Qarmatians, it was kept in this mosque for nearly 22 years.

Before the 2007 restoration, most of the mosque's original structure had fallen apart, with only a small number of its arches surviving. These remains include two pointed keel arches from one arcade of the mosque and a part of the qibla wall consisting of three keel-arch niches, and probably dated to the 9th century CE. The central niche of the qibla wall is larger than the other two and acts as the mihrab, which projects from the outer side of the wall.

== See also ==
- Islam in Saudi Arabia
- List of mosques in Saudi Arabia
- Al-Ahsa Oasis
- List of the oldest mosques
