= Qarah =

Qarah may refer to:

- Qərəh, a village in Siazan Rayon, Azerbaijan
- Qarah, Iran, a village in Chaharmahal and Bakhtiari Province, Iran
- Qarah, Syria, a town in Rif Dimashq Governorate, Syria
- Tell Qarah, a village in Aleppo Governorate, Syria

== See also ==
- Al qarah (disambiguation)
