= Bani Khalid Emirate =

Arabian state (1669–1796)

Bani Khalid Emirate إِمَارَةُ بَنِي خَالِدٍ (Arabic)
- 1669–1796
- Flag Emblem, symbolizes an eagle's talons.

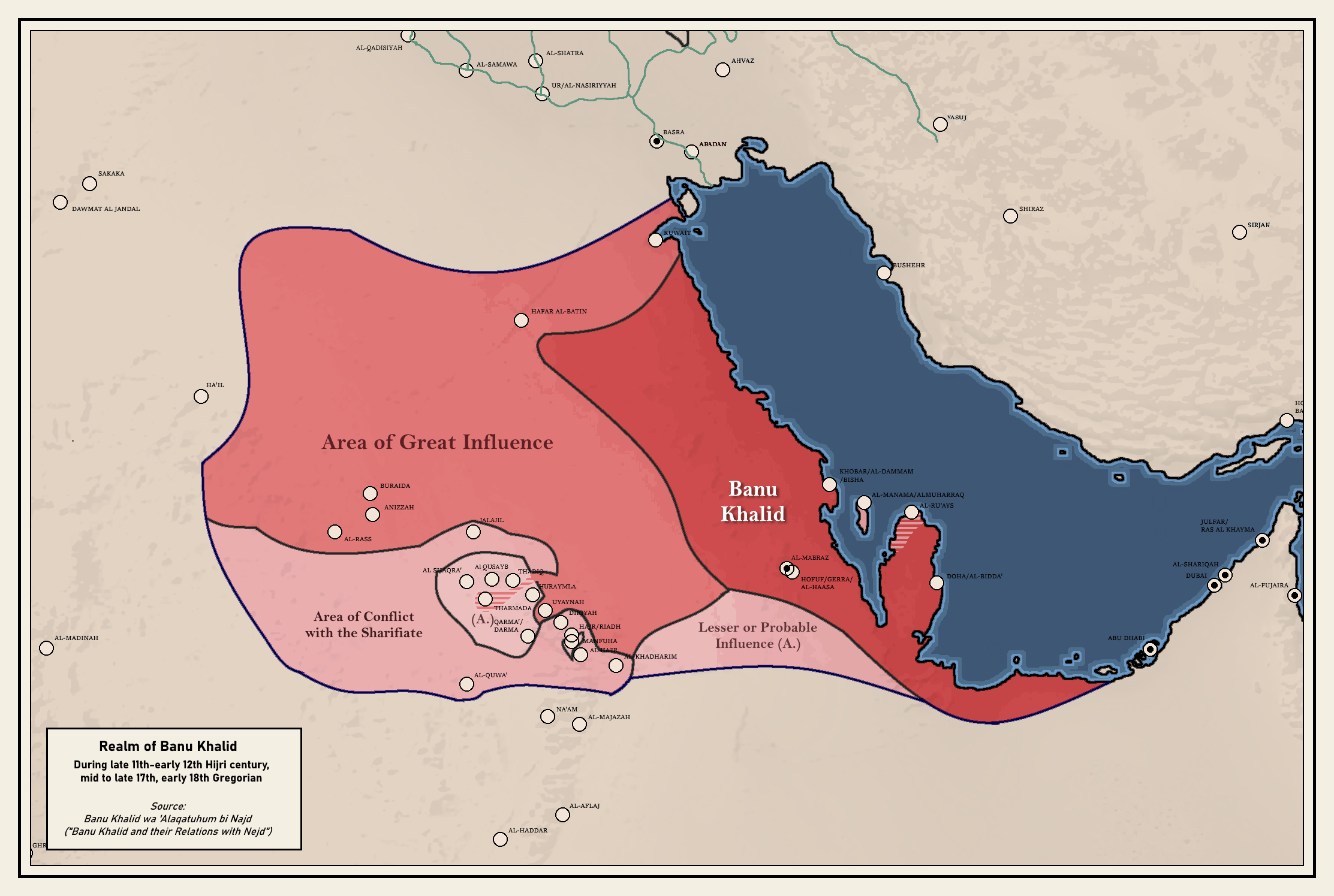
- Territories and zones of influence of the Bani Khalid Emirate, mid-late 17th-18th century (late 11th to early 12th Hijri century)
- Capital: Hofuf (first)
- Common languages: Arabic
- Religion: Sunni Islam
- Government: Emirate
  - 1669–1682: Barrak ibn Ghurayr (first)
  - 1793–1796: Barak bin Abdul Mohsen (last)
- Historical era: 17th-18th centuries
  - Established: 1669
  - Disestablished: 1796
- Currency: Bani Khalid Dinar
Preceded by	Succeeded by
Portuguese Empire; Lahsa Eyalet	Emirate of Kuwait; First Saudi state
- Today part of: Saudi Arabia; Kuwait; Qatar; United Arab Emirates

Bani Khalid Emirate (Arabic: إِمَارَةُ بَنِي خَالِدٍ) or the Emirate of Al Humaid from the Bani Khalid tribe was a state that arose in the eastern region of the Arabian Peninsula in 1669 after Emir Barrak ibn Ghurayr made his capital in Al-Mubarraz, then managed to defeat the Ottoman Empire represented by Lahsa Eyalet and drove them out of the region. The Emirate of Al Humaid ceased to exist in 1796 after the defeat of Barak bin Abdul Mohsen at the hands of the First Saudi State.

== History ==
=== First Khalidi Emirate ===
The main branches of the tribe are the Al Humaid, the Juboor, the Du'um, the Al Janah, the Al Suhoob, the Grusha, the Al Musallam, the 'Amayer, the Al Subaih and the Mahashir & Nahood. The chieftainship of the Bani Khalid has traditionally been held by the clan of Al Humaid. The Bani Khalid dominated the deserts surrounding the Al-Hasa and Al-Qatif during the 15th and 18th century. Under Barrak ibn Ghurayr of the Al Humaid, the Bani Khalid were able to expel Ottoman forces from the cities and towns in 1670 and proclaim their rule over the region. Ibn Ghurayr made his capital in Al-Mubarraz (in present-day eastern Saudi Arabia), where remnants of his castle stand today. According to Arabian folklore, one chief of the Bani Khalid attempted to protect the prized desert bustard (Habari) from extinction by prohibiting the bedouin in his realm from poaching the bird's eggs, earning the tribe the appellation of "protectors of the eggs of the Habari", an allusion to the chief's absolute supremacy over his realm.

=== Fall to the Saudis ===
The Bani Khalid of eastern Arabia maintained ties with members of their tribe who had settled in Najd during their earlier migration eastwards, and also cultivated clients among the rulers of the Najdi towns, such as the Al Mu'ammar of al-Uyayna. When the emir of Uyayna adopted the ideas of Muhammad ibn Abd al-Wahhab, the Khalidi chief ordered him to cease support for Ibn Abd al-Wahhab and expel him from his town. The emir agreed, and Ibn Abd al-Wahhab moved to neighboring Diriyah, where he joined forces with the Al Saud. The Bani Khalid remained staunch enemies of the Saudis and their allies and attempted to invade Najd and Diriyah in an effort to stop Saudi expansion. The first attacks of the Al Saud occurred in 1763 which were led by Abdulaziz bin Muhammad. Their efforts failed, however, and after conquering Najd, the Saudis invaded the Bani Khalid's domain in al-Hasa and deposed the Al 'Ura'yir in 1789.

=== Return and fall from power ===
When the Ottomans invaded Arabia and overthrew the Al Saud in 1818, they conquered al-Hasa, al-Qatif and reinstated members of the Al 'Uray'ir as rulers of the region. The Bani Khalid were no longer the potent military force they once were at this time, and tribes such as the Ajman, the Dawasir, and Subay' began encroaching on the Bani Khalid's desert territories. They were also beset by internal quarrels over leadership. Though the Bani Khalid were able to forge an alliance with the 'Anizzah tribe in this period, they were eventually defeated by an alliance of several tribes along with the Al Saud, who had reestablished their rule in Riyadh in 1823. A battle with an alliance led by the Mutayr and Ajman tribes in 1823, and another battle with the Subay' and the Al Saud in 1830, brought the rule of the Bani Khalid to a close. The Ottomans appointed a governor from Bani Khalid over al-Hasa once more in 1874, but his rule also was short-lived.

== List of rulers ==
=== Emirs of Bani Khalid (1669–1796) ===
Name	Reign start	Reign end	Notes
Barrak ibn Ghurayr	1669	1682	
Muhammad bin Ghurair	1682	1691	
Sa'dun bin Muhammad	1691	1722	
Ali bin Muhammad	1722	1736	
Sulayman bin Muhammad Al Khalidi	1736	1752	
Urayar bin Dajeen bin Saadoun	1752	1774	
Bateen Bin Urayer	1774	1775	
Dajeen bin Urayer	1775	1775	
Sa'dun bin Urayar	1775	1786	
Duwaihis Bin Urayar	1786	1793	
Zaid bin Urayar	1793	1794	
Barak bin Abdul Mohsen	1793	1796	
