= Lahsa Eyalet =

Administrative division of the Ottoman Empire from 1560 to 1670

Arabic: إيالة الأحساء
- Eyalet of the Ottoman Empire
- 1560–1670
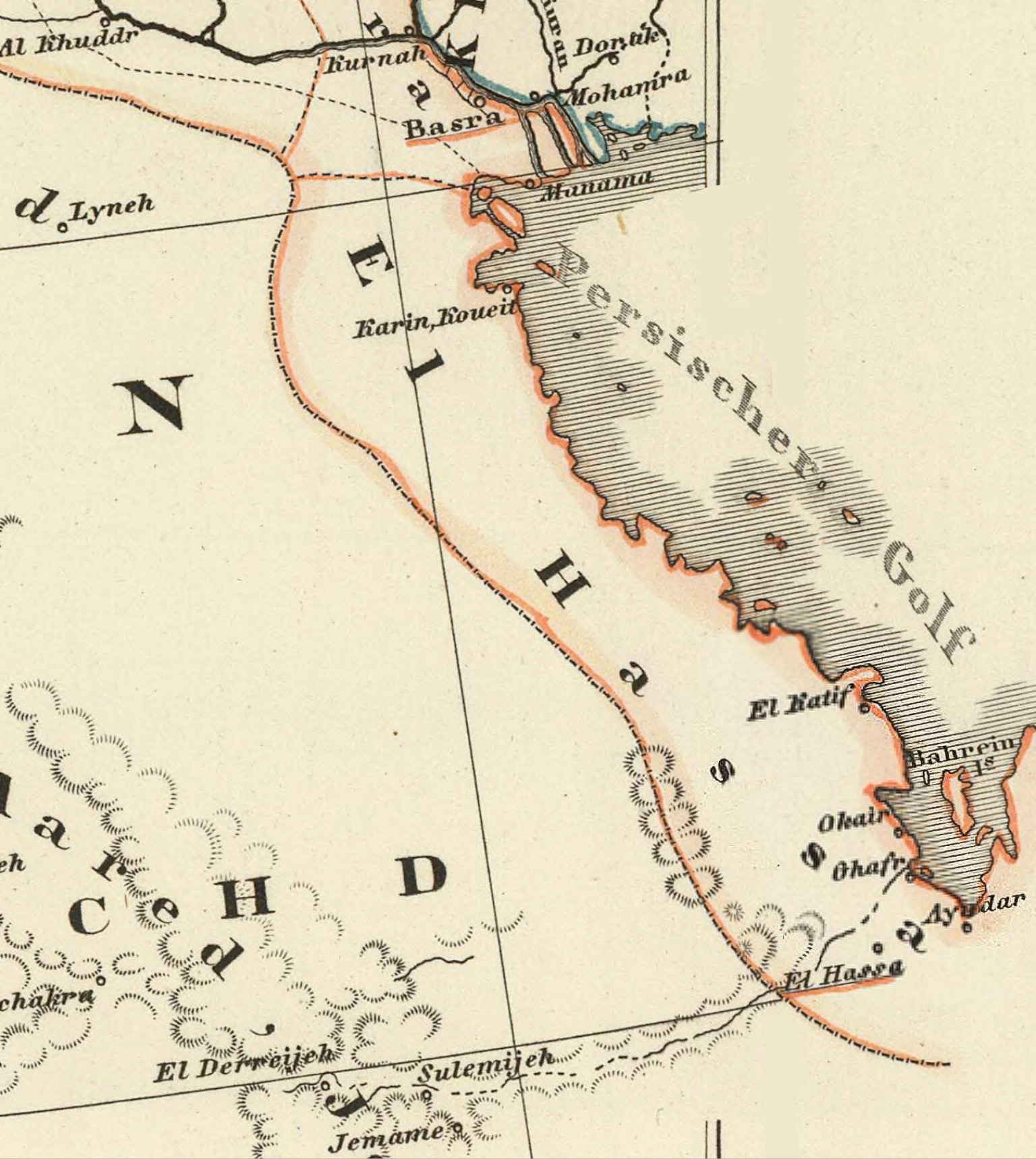
- The al-Hasa region (1855)
- History
  - Established: 1560
  - Disestablished: 1670
Preceded by	Succeeded by
Portuguese Empire; Jabrids	Bani Khalid Emirate
- Today part of: Bahrain; Kuwait; Saudi Arabia

Lahsa Eyalet (Arabic: إيالة الأحساء; Ottoman Turkish: ایالت لحسا, romanized: Eyālet-i Laḥsā) was an eyalet of the Ottoman Empire. The territory of the former eyalet is now part of Saudi Arabia, Kuwait, and Qatar. Al-Ahsa and Qatif were the main cities of the eyalet, and it was named after the former.

The area was occupied by Ottoman forces in the middle of the 16th century, and it would be administered by them, with varying degrees of effectiveness, for the next 130 years.

== History ==
The beglerbegilik of Al-Hasa was established in 1552, primarily to protect Basra's trade with India, since the Portuguese were making raids on the coasts and on shipping in the Persian Gulf. By March 1552, garrisons had been introduced in Lahsa, the largest town in the region. The first land survey of the newly occupied province began before September 1553. For the first few years of occupation, Lahsa was administered as a district of Basra. By 1560, the district officer was promoted to governor-general.

The first attempted invasion of Bahrain from Lahsa by Ottomans was made in the summer of 1559, when an invasion force of 600-1,000 men was despatched by Mustafa Pasha, governor-general of Lahsa, who acted on his own, presumably to impress Sultan Suleiman. It ended with disastrous results: the surrender of the Ottoman forces and their withdrawal after paying a ransom of 1 million akçe. Mustafa Pasha died (how is not explained), but the men returned to the mainland in March or April 1560.

With the withdrawal of most of the garrison, the Bani Khalid Emirate leaders, the erstwhile rulers of the area, used the opportunity to rebel against the Ottomans, occupying Lahsa and establishing Mubarraz as headquarters. Order was restored with the arrival of a new governor-general and new troops.

The Portuguese squadron in Hormuz then controlled all traffic in the Persian Gulf, raiding Al-Katif in 1552, 1559 and 1573. By 1566, attempts were made to establish peaceful relationships with the Portuguese in the Hormuz base. In 1568 the Ottomans made further naval preparations to capture Bahrain, but the rebellion in Yemen the same year curbed all such plans.

Later on, the Ottomans made new preparations at Al-Hasa to take Bahrain, but in general they remained defensive, especially when a new war against Iran began in 1578. The governor-general Ahmed Bey made himself unpopular with the people, and was overthrown in 1580 after two years of tumultuous rule. Shortly after peace was signed with Shah Abbas in September 1591, the governor-general of Lahsa was granted permission to conquer Bahrain, but no action was taken by Lahsa.

The Ottomans gave the shaikhs of the Banu Khalid administrative titles and salaries, but the tribe never submitted totally to the Ottoman jurisdiction.

In 1669-1670, under the leadership of Barrak ibn Ghurayr ibn Uthman, the Al-Humaid section of the Banu Khalid tribe was finally able to defeat the Ottoman garrison at al-Ahsa in battle, leaving the administration no choice but to withdraw peacefully from al-Ahsa. The Banu Khalid set up an independent state, the Bani Khalid Emirate, in 1670.

== Administrative divisions ==
Sanjaks of the Eyalet in the 16th century:
1. Sanjak of Uyun (since 1560)
2. Sanjak of Badiye (the Desert; since 1560)
3. Sanjak of Tuhaymiyah (after 1578)
4. Sanjak of Cebrin (after 1578)
5. Sanjak of Cisse (after 1573)
6. Sanjak of Mubarraz (after 1573)
Sanjaks of the Eyalet in the 17th century:
1. Sanjak of Aiwen
2. Sanjak of Sakul
3. Sanjak of Negniie
4. Sanjak of Netif
5. Sanjak of Benderazir
6. Sanjak of Giriz

== See also ==
- Ottoman campaign against Hormuz
- Sanjak of Najd
