= Third Raid on Banu Thalabah =

Date	October 627 AD, 6th month 6 AH
Location	Al-Taraf
Result	Successful raid, 20 camels captured

Commanders and leaders
Zayd ibn Harithah	Unknown

Strength
15	Unknown

Casualties and losses
None	20 camels captured

Third Raid on Banu Thalabah took place in September, 627AD, 6th month of 6AH of the Islamic calendar

In Jumada Ath-Thania, Zaid as the commander of 15 men raided Bani Tha‘labah and captured 20 of their camels but the tribe members had fled. He spent four days there and then returned to Medina.

The First Raid on Banu Thalabah had taken place two months earlier.

== Islamic Primary sources ==
This event is mentioned in Ibn Sa'd, Kitab al-tabaqat al-kabir, Volume 2

== See also ==
- Military career of Muhammad
- List of expeditions of Muhammad
