= Al-Jafr, Saudi Arabia =

Human settlement in Saudi Arabia

Coordinates: 25°23′N 49°43′E

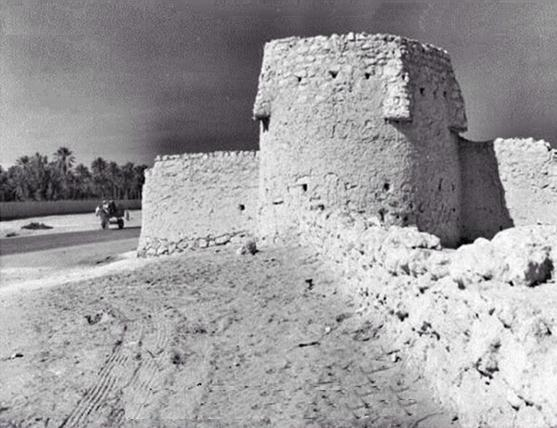
An old historical castle in the city of Jafr Al-Ahsa

Al-Jafr (also spelled Al-Jafer or Al-Jafar) ( Arabic = الجفر ) is a village in Al-Ahsa in Saudi Arabia. It is located about 10 km from Al-Hofuf and one of the eastern villages of Al-Ahsa. Unlike nearby villages Al-Jafr has some government offices like Al-Jafr police station and Al-Jafr General Hospital.

== See also ==
- Al-Ahsa
