= Al-Qarah, Hadhramaut =

Al-Qarah
- Country: Yemen
- Governorate: Hadhramaut
- Time zone: UTC+3 (Yemen Standard Time)

Al-Qarah is a village in east-central Yemen. It is located in the Hadhramaut Governorate.
