= Al-Qarah =

Village in Al-Ahsa, Eastern Province, Saudi Arabia

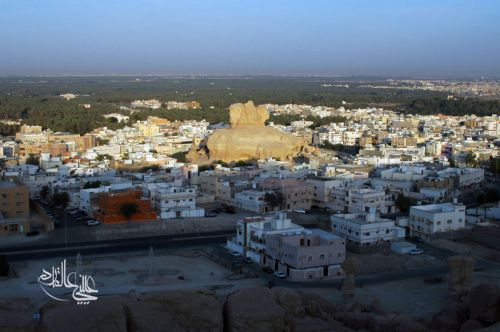
The village of Al-Qarah

Al-Garah (Arabic: قَرْيَة ٱلْقَارَة, romanized: Qaryat Al-Qārah) is a village in Al-Ahsa, in the Eastern Province of Saudi Arabia. It known for its small mountain, and is one of Al-Ahsa Oasis' eastern villages and is located about 10 km (6.2 miles) northeast of the center of Al-Hofuf, 140 km (87 mi) southwest of Dammam, and 300 km (190 mi) east of Riyadh.

== Jabal Al-Qarah ==
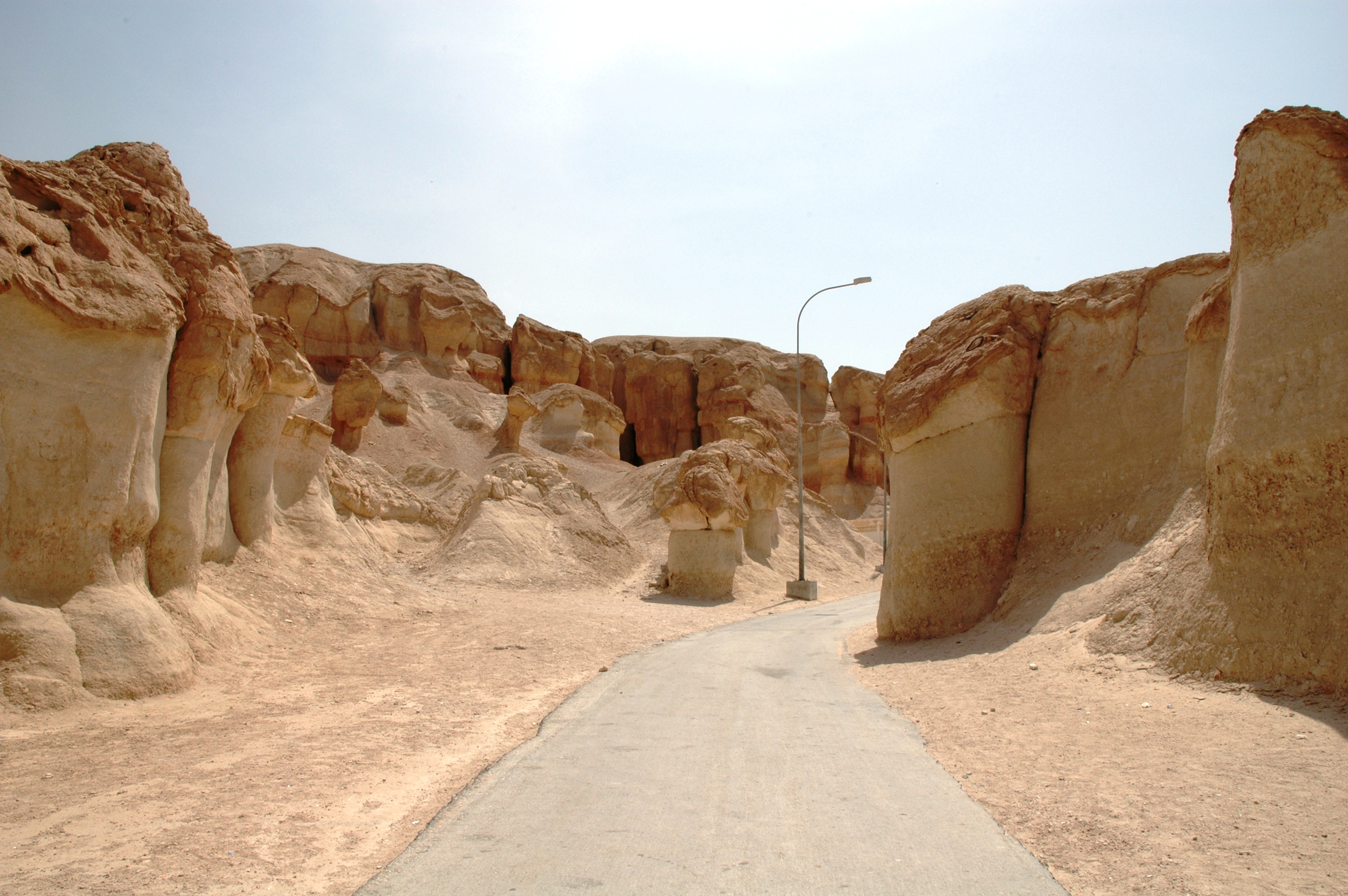
Path to the caves

Jabal Al-Qarah is a mesa that stands about 75 metres (246 ft) high, with a maximum elevation of 225 m (738 ft) above sea level. It has many caves with very cool air inside. Unlike many caves, these were formed by subaerial weathering rather than dissolution, and as a result have a highly distinctive shape. The mountain attracts many people especially from nearby villages, and has been targeted for additional touristic development. Although there are no other hills for a considerable distance, Jabal Al-Qarah is an outlier of the larger Shedgum Plateau.

The caves, which include 28 tall linear passageways totaling 1.5 kilometres (0.93 mi) in length, have long been a site of commerce. Some caves of Jabl Al-Garah have traditionally been the site of the workshops of local traditional potters, who are known for the quality of their wares.

A plaque about the mountain and a parking lot near the main access trail is at 25.411509°N 49.692755°E.

== See also ==
- Eastern Arabia
