= Al-arba' Mountain =

Mountain in Al-Ahsa Governorate, Saudi Arabia

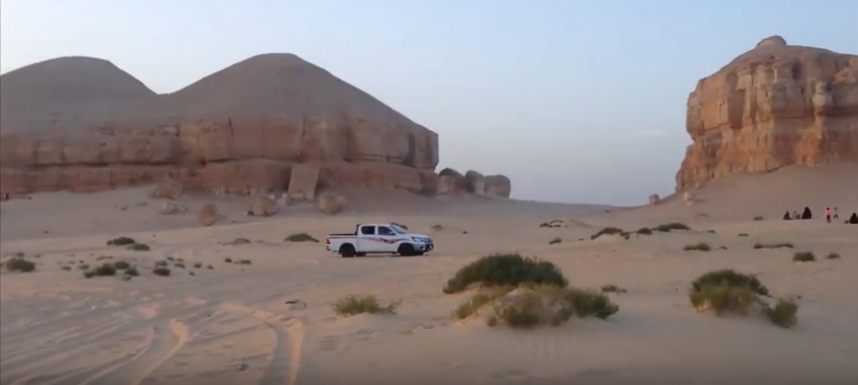

Highest point
- Coordinates: 25°17′19″N 49°42′56″E

Geography
- Location within Saudi Arabia Location within West and Central Asia
- Saudi Arabia Location in Saudi Arabia
- Location: Al-Ahsa Governorate, Saudi Arabia

Geology
- Mountain type: mudstone

Al-arba' Mountain is one of the mountains in Al-Ahsa Governorate, in the Eastern Province of Saudi Arabia. It is located on the road heading to Qatar. It is one of a group of mountains in Al-Ahsa such as Al-Qara, Al-Shu'ba, Abu Hussais and Kanzan. Al-arba' Mountain gets its name from its inclusion of three closely spaced mountains and a separate one. The mountain is located 22 kilometers southeast of Hofuf.

== Location ==
To the north of the mountain is also the town of Taraf, about 6 kilometers away.

== Name ==
The mountain is named after the presence of four mountains (Al-Qara, Al-Shu'ba, Abu Hassis and Kanzan), three in close proximity and one slightly farther away.

== Description ==
The mountain consists of four cone-shaped plateaus, two of which are contiguous, possibly formed by erosion from a single mountain, due to their clay nature.

== Tourism ==
The mountain is considered historical and archaeological attraction in the Eastern Province. It is one of the points to see the annular eclipse, which is considered a rare cosmic phenomenon.

== History ==
Several tribes settled the mountain. Nearby is the Mujasah Palace, which was the residence of King Abdulaziz.

== Plateaus ==
=== Abu Hassis Mountain ===
It is also known as Abu al-Jamajim Mountain because a battle took place there between the people of the village of Tuwaithir and the Bani Khalid Tribe in the old days, and it has an older name Safa from the days of what is known in the Islamic narrative the time of Jahiliyah. It is located at the northern end of Tuwaithir village, adjacent to Al-Ahsa National Park.

=== Al-Mashqar Mountain, known as Ras al-Jabal ===
It is located in the town of Al-Qara and is an archaeological site where at the top of the mountain was an old fortress known as Al-Mashqar with a well dug in the rocky hollow of the mountain to reach a spring under the mountain called Ain Al-Khasif. It was used to water the fortified forces during periods of siege. According to Dr. Afif Abdul Rahman in his book "Poetry and the Days of the Arabs in the Jahiliyah Era": "The War of Al-Mashqar, also known as the Safqa Day, was between Tamim and the Persian governor in Yemen, in it, Bazam the governor of Kisra in Yemen, sent a caravan carrying clothes and musk to Kisra, but the Banu Hanzala Bin Yarbou Tribe intercepted the caravan and killed its guards. The news reached Kisra, and through his governor at Al-Mashqar, he set a trap for Tamim in a year of drought, and killed a large number of them".

Al-Mashqar Mountain it is mentioned by some of the Arabic poetry like in the poetries of Tarfa ibn al-Abd, al-Asha, Malik ibn Nuwaira, Lubaid ibn Rabia, al-Akhtal, al-Farazdak, Jarir, Dhu al-Rumma, al-Khalil ibn Ahmad al-Farahidi, al-Asmai, Ibn Qutayba, Yaqut al-Hamawi, Ibn al-Muqrab al-Ahsa'i (died after 630 AH).

=== Jubail or Tell al-Shaba'a ===
It is a hill located on the road to the eastern village of Al-Halila amidst palm forests.

=== Bariqa Al Shamali Mountain ===
It is located to the east of the village of Al-Jarn and the road linking the eastern and northern villages.

== Geology ==
Al-Arba' Mountain consists of four cone-shaped plateaus, two joined and two separated. It is located on a high and moving sand dune. The soil of the mountain floor and its minors is reddish. Near Al-Arba' Mountain is the Ain Zaraba' Lake, which is visited by bird-hunting enthusiasts, due to the abundance of tall grasses around it, which enables them to hide inside to hunt migratory birds.

== See also ==
- Sawaj Mountain
