= Badr bin Muhammad Al Saud =

Saudi Arabian politician

- Badr bin Muhammad bin Abdullah bin Jalawi Al Saud
- House: House of Saud
- Father: Muhammad bin Abdullah Al Saud
- Religion: Islam

Badr bin Mohammed bin Abdullah bin Jalawi Al Saud (Arabic: بدر بن محمد بن عبد الله بن جلوي آل سعود; born in Riyadh) is a Saudi prince from the Al Saud family, a descendant of Prince Abdullah bin Jalawi bin Turki Al Saud. He served as the Governor of Al-Ahsa Governorate in the Eastern Province of Saudi Arabia from December 14, 1997, following a royal decree that appointed him to succeed the late previous governor, Mohammed bin Fahd bin Abdullah bin Jalawi Al Saud, who died on July 4, 1996. He held this position until May 5, 2022.

Badr bin Jalawi also serves as the Chairman of the Board of the Al-Ahsa Charitable Society and previously chaired the High Committee for the Al-Ahsa Investment Forum in its fifth session in 2019, which was organized by the Al-Ahsa Chamber in strategic partnership with Saudi Aramco. He holds a bachelor's degree in political science.

== See also ==
- Al-Ahsa
