= Al-Mubarraz =

Al-Mubarraz المبرز
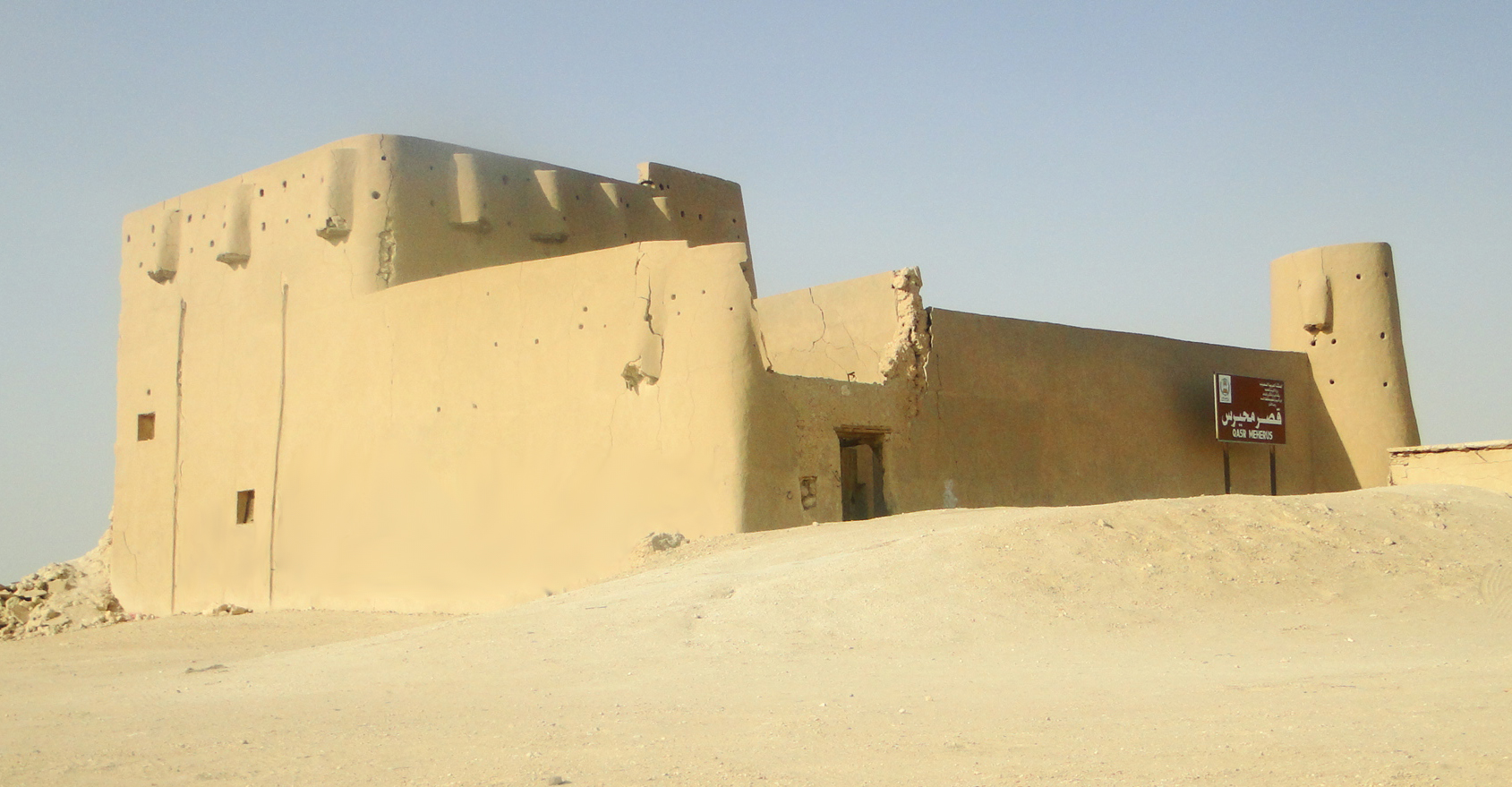

- Location within Saudi Arabia
- Coordinates: 25°23′N 49°36′E
- Country: Saudi Arabia

Government
  - Governor: Badr Bin Muhammad Bin Abdullah Bin Jalawi Al Saud

GDP (PPP, constant 2015 values)
  - Year: 2023
  - Total (Metro): $42.4 billion
  - Per capita: $48,600
- Time zone: UTC+3

Al-Mubarraz is a city located at Al-Ahsa in the Eastern Province of the Kingdom of Saudi Arabia. With a population of 837,000 (as of 2020), it is the north gate for Al-Ahsa governorate. Al-Mubarraz has historical importance because it was the rule center for the district between 1669 and 1793, before the Saudi rule . There are some sayings about its origin and it said that its origin back to the second half of the seventh century in Hijri.

== Naming ==
There are a number of hypotheses about the meaning of the city's name. In Gulf Arabic it stands for "outstanding," "masterly," In Nejdi Arabic the name stands for a place travellers gathered before leaving, so that's way it called Al-mubarraz because the people get to it before their trips. The sheikh Muhammad Alabdulaqader write that the people of Al-Ahsa gather there first before leaving for Al-hajj. so it's agreed between almost all Al-mubarraz people. This last, however, seems like a folk etymology and folklore than reality.

== Relics ==
About the heritage relics, in Al-mubarraz there is two ancient castles; Sahood castle " Qasr Sahood " and Muhaires castle " Qasr Muhaires" . The foundation of Sahood palace date back four thousand years, while the construction dates back to three hundred years only. Muhaires castle was built at the beginning of Saudi era by the prince Muhaires.

Also there is an ancient homes but it is deserted and close to falling because it's not receiving the required attention.

In addition, there is Najm spring "Ain Najm" in Al-mubarraz, it's one of the popular in Al-ahsa and i's a destination for some families at night to spend good time there. Al-mubarraz has some places like the mountains; Al-shu'ba mountain, Al-qara mountain and Al-arba'a mountain, also there is Alasfar mountain which is a place for migratory birds, but It has not been exploited yet as it is an investment project.

== Springs ==
There is several spring in Al-mubarraz, such as; Ain Al-harra which located in the centre of Al-mubarraz, Ain Um saba'a in In the north of Al-Mubarraz near Al-Qurain village, Ain Al-hwerrat also in the north of it, in the centre of Al-mutairfy village, Ain Al-jawharia in Al-battalya village and Ain Bahela both in the east of Al-mubarraz, finally Ain Um Najm in the centre of Al-mubarraz, close to Abu ghanema mountain and it's contain sulfure water which known for treatment, so in the past, many people got to for that, but unfortunately, now it's close, generally it's considered as one of the most important places in the city . Ain Alsouig in Alshroufia neighborhood is the oldest commercial spring in the area but it ceased to exist a few years ago.

== Neighbourhoods ==
The neighborhoods in Al-Mubarraz are divided into two sections, the first section is the old neighborhoods like; Asseiaseb, Al-shu'ba, Al-ouyoni, Al-masoudi, Al-mugabel, Al-otban, qaseba And Al-hazem . while the second section includes the new neighborhoods, for example, Al-yahya neighborhood, Al-mubarraz, Al-shroufia, Arrashdia A, B, C, Almsherfa, Al-nuzha, Boshabal, Al-gassania, Mahasen neighborhood which is for Aramco, Al-qadesia, Al-khars, Al-muhammadia, Al-samer and Al-manqoor .

== Notable people ==
- Mohammad Hussein Al-Khalifa – Fakih Jaafari.
- Mohammad Hussein Al-Ali – Fakih and judge Jaafari.
