= List of countries named after people =

This is a list of countries and dependent territories named after people.

== Sovereign countries named after people ==
Country	Source of name
Azerbaijan	Atropates (initially Atropatene in Ancient Greek, the name evolved to Azerbaijan in Persian)
Bolivia	Simón Bolívar
Colombia	Christopher Columbus
Dominican Republic	Saint Dominic
El Salvador	Jesus ("El Salvador" is the Spanish translation of "The Savior")
Eswatini (Swaziland)	King Mswati II
Kiribati	Thomas Gilbert ("Kiribati" is the Gilbertese rendition of "Gilberts")
Marshall Islands	John Marshall
Mauritius	Maurice of Nassau, Prince of Orange
Mozambique	Mussa Bin Bique
Peru	Birú, a local ruler who lived near the Bay of San Miguel, Panama City, in the early 16th century.
Philippines	King Philip II of Spain
Saint Kitts and Nevis	Saint Christopher
Saint Lucia	Saint Lucy
Saint Vincent and the Grenadines	Saint Vincent of Saragossa
San Marino	Saint Marinus
São Tomé and Príncipe	Saint Thomas, and the Prince of Portugal to whom duties on the island's sugar crop were paid
Saudi Arabia	Saud bin Muhammad Al Muqrin
Seychelles	Jean Moreau de Séchelles
United States of America	Amerigo Vespucci (see Naming of America)
Uzbekistan	Öz Beg Khan (through Uzbeks, see Uzbeks#Etymology)
Venezuela (The Bolivarian Republic of)	Simón Bolívar (for the "Bolivarian Republic" part), the name Venezuela is derived from Venice (a city in northeastern Italy). See: Venezuela#Etymology

=== Countries named after legendary figures ===
Country	Source of name
Afghanistan	Supposedly named after tribal chief Prince Afghana.
Armenia (Hayastan)	Hayk
Belarus	Rus
Cambodia	Sage Kambu Swayambhuva
Czech Republic	Čech
Denmark	Dan I of Denmark
Djibouti	"Djibouti" means "Land of Tehuti" or "Land of Thoth", after the Egyptian Moon God
England	Angul through Angles
Greece (the Hellenic Republic)	Hellen
Hungary	Hunor (or Magyarország — Magor)
Bhārat (India)	Dushyanta's son Bharata or Rishabha's son Bharata
Misr (Egypt)	Misr in Arabic, Misrayim in Hebrew, named after the biblical figure Mizraim.
Israel	Jacob, who was also called Israel in the Bible
Éire (Ireland)	Éire (Ériu), a Celtic fertility goddess
Italy	Italus
Laos	possibly after Lava
Lechia (historical and/or alternative name of Poland)	Lech
Norway	Nór (although other etymologies are generally more widely accepted)
Romania	The name "Romania" is derived from "Rome" (the modern capital city of Italy) / "Roman", which possibly comes from Romulus
Russia	Rus
Solomon Islands	King Solomon of Israel and Judah
Somalia	Supposedly named after Samaale.

=== Former countries named after people ===
Country	Source of name
Abbasid Caliphate	Al-Abbas ibn Abd al-Muttalib
Achaemenid Empire	Achaemenes
Aghlabid Emirate	al-Aghlab ibn Salim, father of Ibrahim I ibn al-Aghlab
Principality of Antioch, now part of Turkey	Antiochus, father of Seleucus I Nicator
Arsacid Empire	Arsaces I
Artuqid State	Artuk Bey
Ayyubid Sultanate	Najm al-Din Ayyub
Buyid Emirate	Buya ibn Panah-Khusrow, father of Imad al-Dawla, founder of the emirate, and his brothers Rukn al-Dawla and Mu'izz al-Dawla
Kingdom of Dahomey and Republic of Dahomey, now part of Benin	Chief Dan, who was killed by Chief Dakodonu in a dispute after sarcastically saying "shall I open up my belly and build a palace inside it?"; Dan=chief, xo=Belly, me=Inside of
Fatimid Empire	Fatima, daughter of the Prophet Muhammad
Gupta Empire	Gupta
Hamdanid state	Hamdan ibn Hamdun
Hammadid Sultanate	Hammad ibn Buluggin
Idrisid Emirate of Asir	Idris I
Idrisid state	Idris I
Jabrids Emirate	Jabr ibn Mady
Jarwanid Emirate	Jarwan ibn Nasser
Lotharingia (Lorraine), now part of Belgium, France, Germany, Luxembourg, and the Netherlands	Lothair II
Rhodesia (former name of Zimbabwe)	Cecil Rhodes
Samo's Empire	Samo, a Slavic king
Seljuk Empire	Seljuk, legendary founding warlord of the Seljuk Empire
Sultanate of Rum (Saljuqiyan-i Rum)	Seljuk, legendary founding warlord of the Seljuk Empire
Ottoman Empire	Osman I, founder of the empire
Umayyad Caliphate	Umayya ibn Abd Shams
Sasanian Empire	Sasan
Timurid Empire	Timur
Mirdasid state	Mirdas ibn Idris, father of Salih ibn Mirdas
Usfurid Emirate	Usfur ibn Rashid
Samanid Empire	Saman Khuda
Zirid state	Ziri ibn Manad
Marinid Sultanate	Marin ibn wartajin
Nasrid Kingdom of Granada	Nasr ibn al-Aḥmar
Safavid Empire	Safi-ad-din Ardabili
Seleucid Empire	Seleucus I Nicator
Ptolemaic Kingdom	Ptolemy I Soter
Qedarite Kingdom	Qedar, son of Ishmael
Mazyadid Emirate	Mazyad ibn Marthad
Rashidi Emirate	Rashid ibn Hamad
Numayrid Emirate	Numayr ibn Āmir ibn Ṣaʿṣaʿa
Uqaylid Emirate	Uqayl ibn Ka'b ibn Rabi'a ibn Āmir ibn Ṣaʿṣaʿa
Shah Mir Sultanate	Shah Mir
Tulunid Emirate	Tulun, father of Ahmad ibn Tulun
Sur Empire	Sher Shah Suri

== Dependent territories named after people ==
Territory	Source of name
Baker Island	Michael Baker
Bermuda	Juan de Bermúdez
Bouvet Island	Jean-Baptiste Charles Bouvet de Lozier
Clipperton Island	John Clipperton
Cocos (Keeling) Islands	Captain William Keeling
Cook Islands	Captain James Cook
Falkland Islands	Anthony Cary, 5th Viscount Falkland
Gibraltar	Tariq ibn Ziyad (from Jabal Ṭāriq, meaning 'Mountain of Tariq')
Jan Mayen	Jan Jacobszoon May van Schellinkhout
Jarvis Island	Edward, Thomas and William Jarvis
Johnston Atoll	Captain Charles J. Johnston
Kingman Reef	Captain W.E. Kingman
Isle of Man	Manannán mac Lir
Montserrat	Our Lady of Montserrat (Virgin Mary)
Norfolk Island	Wife of Edward Howard, 9th Duke of Norfolk
Northern Mariana Islands	Mariana of Austria
Peter I Island	Peter the Great
Pitcairn Islands	Robert Pitcairn (midshipman)
Queen Maud Land	Maud of Wales
Ross Dependency	James Clark Ross
Saint Barthélemy	Saint Bartholomew
Saint Helena, Ascension and Tristan da Cunha	Saint Helena of Constantinople and Tristão da Cunha
Saint Martin	Martin of Tours
Saint Pierre and Miquelon	Saint Peter and Saint Michael
Sint Maarten	Martin of Tours
South Georgia and the South Sandwich Islands	George II of Great Britain and John Montagu, 4th Earl of Sandwich
Tasmania	Abel Tasman
Virgin Islands	Saint Ursula and her 11,000 virgins
Wake Island	William Wake
Wallis and Futuna	Samuel Wallis

== See also ==
- List of country name etymologies
- List of country subdivisions named after people
