= Portuguese invasion of Bahrain =

1521 conquest securing the Persian Gulf

Invasion of Bahrain (1521)
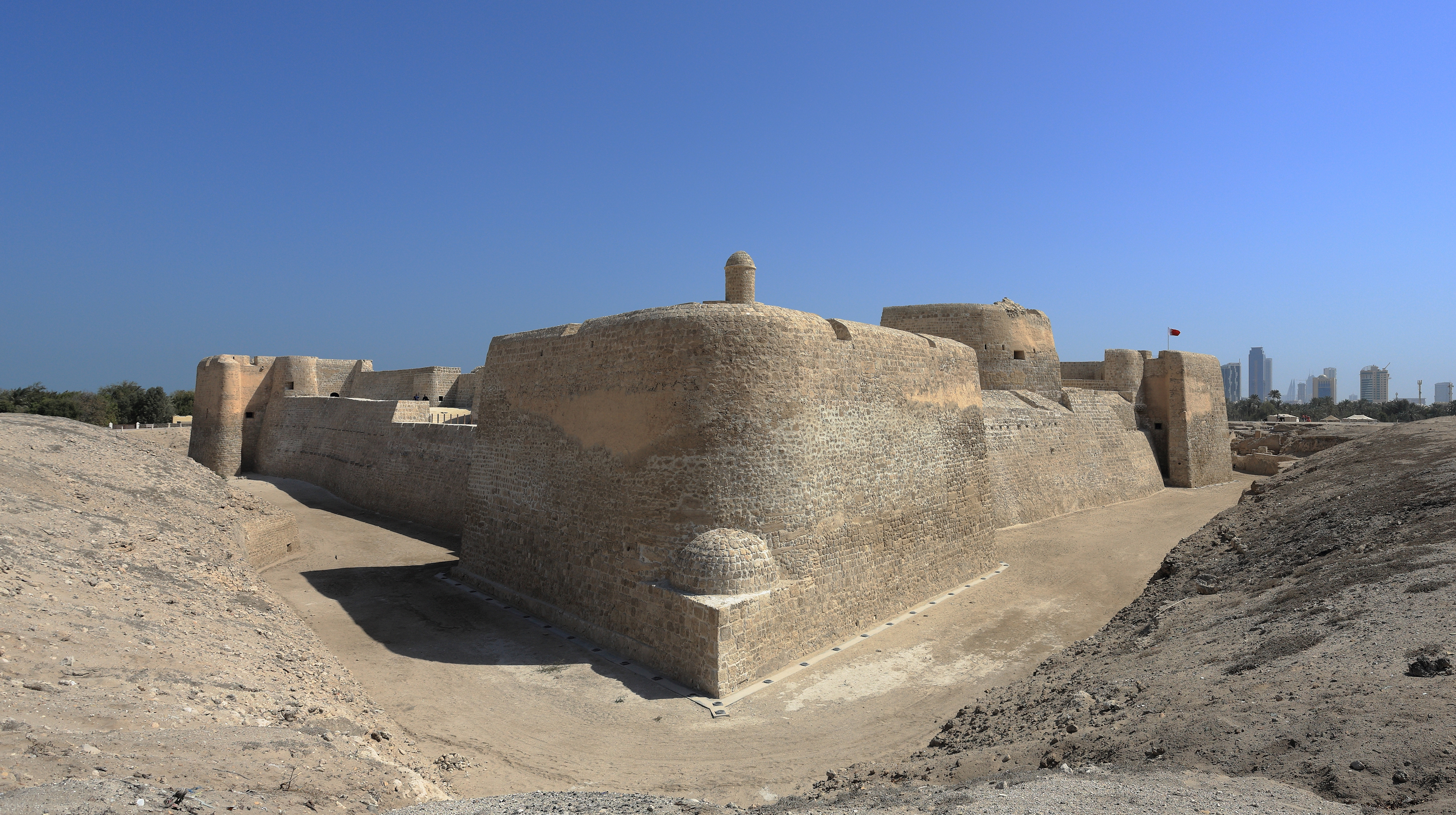
- Portuguese fort in Bahrain
Date	1521
Location	Bahrain, Persian Gulf
Result	Portuguese victory
Territorial changes	Portuguese dominance of the Persian Gulf secured

Belligerents
Portuguese Empire; Hormuz	Jabrids

Commanders and leaders
(Portuguese Empire) António Correia	Muqrin ibn Zamil †

Strength
1,200 warriors 200 vessels	12,000 men

Casualties and losses
Unknown	Heavy

The Portuguese capture of Bahrain from the Jabrids Emirate was a campaign that took place in 1521 by Portuguese forces under the command of António Correia.

== Background ==
Years before, the Portuguese conquered Hormuz, transforming it into a client-state. This conquest gave them full control of the trade between India and Europe passing through the Persian Gulf.

The Portuguese were determined to ensure that Bahrain acknowledged the authority of the king of Hormuz and paid him yearly taxes, with a large portion going to the vizier Rukn ed-Din, who had significant business interests there. Bahrain was considered one of the king's important territories due to its strategic and commercial value.

Wanting to strengthen his hold over Bahrain, the king of Hormuz sought the Portuguese's assistance, as their treaty obligated them to defend his lands. He requested soldiers and ships to help him reclaim control over Bahrain and al-Qatif. The Portuguese saw this as an opportunity to weaken Muqrin, the king of al-Hasa, particularly his naval power, which posed a threat to their interests in the region.

A campaign against Bahrain was decided upon after the arrival of Indian vessels at Hormuz in early May 1521.

== The Invasion ==
Portuguese naval and war banner featuring the Cross of the Order of Christ.

Bahrain was well fortified, but this did not prevent the Portuguese from landing their troops on 27th June.

A battle began and initially Muqrin's troops had the advantage, but after a short period of fighting, he was hit and immediately withdrew from the battle. He ended up dying three days later and his head was cut off and sent to Hormuz. The Portuguese commander, António Correia, later depicted King Muqrin's bleeding severed head on his family's coat of arms in Lousã, which still remains a feature of the coat of arms of the Count of Lousã, Correia's descendant in Portugal. Bahrain was then sacked and its ships set ablaze by the Portuguese.

== Aftermath ==
After the conquest of Bahrain, Correia appointed a man by the name of Lucat who was an Arab well respected by the local population to be the governor.

The success in this campaign further weakened the Shias, since it cut their continuity of rule over Bahrain. Other Sunni territories around that area, such as Qatif and Hasa, voluntarily surrendered to Ottoman rule with fear of the Portuguese.

The Portuguese swiftly began constructing a massive fort complex at Qalat Al Bahrain to assert control over their newly acquired territory. This fortification remains today as a UNESCO World Heritage Site. However, a significant consequence of this period was the transformation of the term "Bahrain." Prior to António Correia's invasion, "Bahrain" referred to the broader historic region, but afterwards, it came to denote specifically the archipelago that forms the modern state. Correia's invasion essentially defined the territorial boundaries of the country.

== See also ==
- Persian Gulf
- Portuguese conquest of Goa
- Afonso de Albuquerque
- Portuguese conquest of Hormuz
- Portuguese India
- Acehnese-Portuguese conflicts
