= History of colonialism =

Extent of colonization by European, Turkish, American, and Japanese powers (1492–2007)

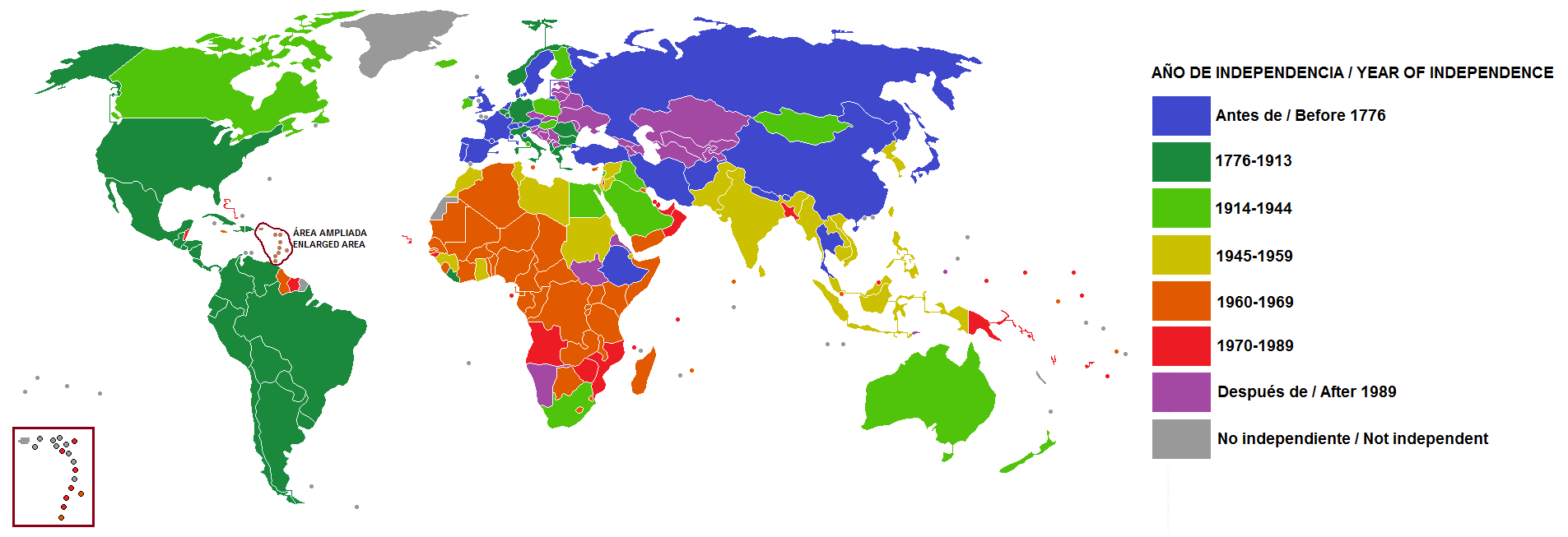
Map of the year ranges in which present-day sovereign states achieved independence

Colonialism is a phenomenon that has occurred throughout human history across the world. Colonies were established by many prominent ancient and medieval civilizations, such as the Phoenicians, the Babylonians, the Persians, the Greeks, the Romans, the Han Chinese, and the Arabs, among others. The High Middle Ages saw a variety of European civilizations moving west, north, east, and south out of their continent; Crusader states established in the Levant between 1098 and 1291 exemplify some features similar to those of ancient colonies.

The beginning of the "Age of Discovery" around 1418 marked a new phase of European colonialism led by the Portuguese, who became increasingly expansionist following their conquest of Ceuta in 1415. Portugal aimed to control navigation routes through the Strait of Gibraltar, to spread Christianity, to amass wealth and plunder, and to suppress predation on Portuguese populations by the Muslim Barbary corsairs, who operated as part of a long-running African slave trade that the Portuguese would soon reverse and surpass. Around 1450, the Portuguese developed a lighter ship—the caravel—based on North African fishing boats. Caravels could sail further and faster than previous vessels, were highly maneuverable, and had the capability of sailing into the wind.

Enabled by new maritime technology—and with the added incentive to find an alternative "Silk Road" after the Ottoman conquest of Constantinople effectively closed profitable trade routes between Asia and Europe in 1453—early European exploration of Africa was followed by the Spanish exploration of the Americas, further exploration along Africa's coasts, and explorations of West Asia (also called the "Middle East"), South Asia, and East Asia.

The conquest of the Canary Islands by the Crown of Castile, from 1402 to 1496, was an early instance of European settler colonialism in the African continent. In 1462, the Portuguese established the first European settlement in the tropics by peopling the previously uninhabited Cape Verde archipelago, which thereafter became a site of Jewish exile during the height of the Portuguese and Spanish Inquisitions in the 1490s; the Portuguese soon also brought slaves from the West African coast. Because of the economics of plantations, especially sugar, much European colonial expansion and slavery would remain linked into the 19th century. The use of exile to penal colonies would also continue.

The European "discovery" of the "New World" (as named by Amerigo Vespucci in 1503) opened another colonial chapter, with the first European forts at Hispaniola marking the beginning of the colonization of the Caribbean—and thereby the colonization of the Americas—in 1493. The Portuguese and Spanish Empires were the first trans-oceanic global empires: they were the first to stretch across different continents (discounting Eurasian empires and those with land in Africa along the Mediterranean), covering vast territories around the world. Between 1580 and 1640, the Portuguese and Spanish Empires were both ruled by the Spanish monarchs in personal union. During the late 16th and 17th centuries, England, France, and the Dutch Republic also established their own overseas empires, each in direct competition with the other European expansionists. Meanwhile, the Tsardom of Russia expanded overland: Russian Central Asian and North Asian colonies eventually extended to Alaska and California.

The end of the 18th and mid-19th century saw the first era of decolonization, when most of the European colonies in the Americas—notably those of Spain, New France, and the Thirteen Colonies—gained their independence from their respective metropoles. The Kingdom of Great Britain (uniting Scotland and England), France, Portugal, and the Dutch turned their attention to the Old World, particularly South Asia (India) and Southeast Asia, where coastal enclaves had already been established.

In the 19th century, the Second Industrial Revolution led to what has been termed the era of New Imperialism, when the pace of colonization rapidly accelerated, the height of which was the Scramble for Africa, in which Belgium, Germany, and Italy also participated. From the late 19th century onward: the Japanese colonial empire was established and expanded to cover significant parts of East Asia and the Pacific, notably Taiwan, Korea, and Manchukuo; contemporarily in Europe, the rise of Nazi Germany led to the adoption of the concept of Lebensraum settler-colonialism in Eastern Europe, while Fascist Italy continued to pursue colonialism in northern and eastern Africa. All three are viewed as causes of World War II, having been sparked by their actions under an alliance known as the Axis powers.

There were deadly battles between colonizing states and revolutions in colonized areas, shaping areas of control and establishing independent nations. During the 20th century, the colonies of the defeated Central Powers of World War I were distributed amongst the victorious Allied Powers as League of Nations mandates after 1918, but it was not until after the end of World War II in 1945 that the second phase of decolonization began in earnest.

== Periodization ==
Some commentators identify three waves of European colonialism.

The two main countries in the first wave of European colonialism were Portugal and Spain. The Portuguese started the long age of European colonization with the conquest of Ceuta, Morocco in 1415, and the conquest and discovery of other African territories and islands, this would also start the movement known as the Age of Discoveries. The Spanish and Portuguese launched the colonization of the Americas, basing their territorial claims on the Treaty of Tordesillas of 1494. This treaty demarcated the respective spheres of influence of Spain and Portugal.

The expansion achieved by Spain and Portugal caught the attention of Britain, France, and the Netherlands. The entrance of these three powers into the Caribbean and North America perpetuated European colonialism in these regions.

The second wave of European colonialism commenced with Britain's involvement in Asia in support of the British East India Company; other countries such as France, Portugal and the Netherlands also had involvement in European expansion in Asia.

The third wave ("New Imperialism") consisted of the Scramble for Africa regulated by the terms of the Berlin Conference of 1884–1885. The conference effectively divided Africa among the European powers. Vast regions of Africa came under the sway of Britain, France, Germany, Portugal, Belgium, Italy and Spain.

Gilmartin argues that these three waves of colonialism were linked to capitalism. The first wave of European expansion involved exploring the world to find new revenue and perpetuating European feudalism. The second wave focused on developing the mercantile capitalism system and the manufacturing industry in Europe. The last wave of European colonialism solidified all capitalistic endeavors by providing new markets and raw materials.

As a result of these waves of European colonial expansion, only thirteen present-day independent countries escaped formal colonization by European powers: Afghanistan, Bhutan, Iran, Japan, Liberia, Mongolia, Nepal, China, North Korea, Saudi Arabia, South Korea, Thailand, and Turkey (Note: Some scholars consider the Ottoman Empire to have been a colonial power.) as well as North Yemen.

== Colonialism in ancient times (3200 BC – 7th century AD) ==
Colonialism in antiquity was primarily characterized by the establishment of settlements and outposts by expanding civilizations for trade, agriculture, and military advantage. In the Mediterranean, the Phoenicians developed a vast network of maritime trading colonies, most notably Carthage in North Africa, which allowed them to dominate commerce across the region. From the 8th to 6th centuries BC, the ancient Greeks founded hundreds of colonies (apoikiai) across the Mediterranean and Black Sea coasts to alleviate overpopulation, secure arable land, and expand trade, profoundly spreading Hellenic culture.

The Roman Republic and later the Roman Empire utilized colonization as a tool of military and political integration. Roman colonies (coloniae) were often established to secure newly conquered territories and reward military veterans with land, particularly in North Africa, which became a vital agricultural hub for the empire. Meanwhile, in East Asia, the Han dynasty of China expanded its influence by establishing the Four Commanderies of Han in the northern Korean peninsula during the 2nd century BC. These served as administrative and cultural outposts to project imperial power and control regional trade routes.

== Portuguese and Spanish colonial hegemony: the Americas (15th century–1770) ==
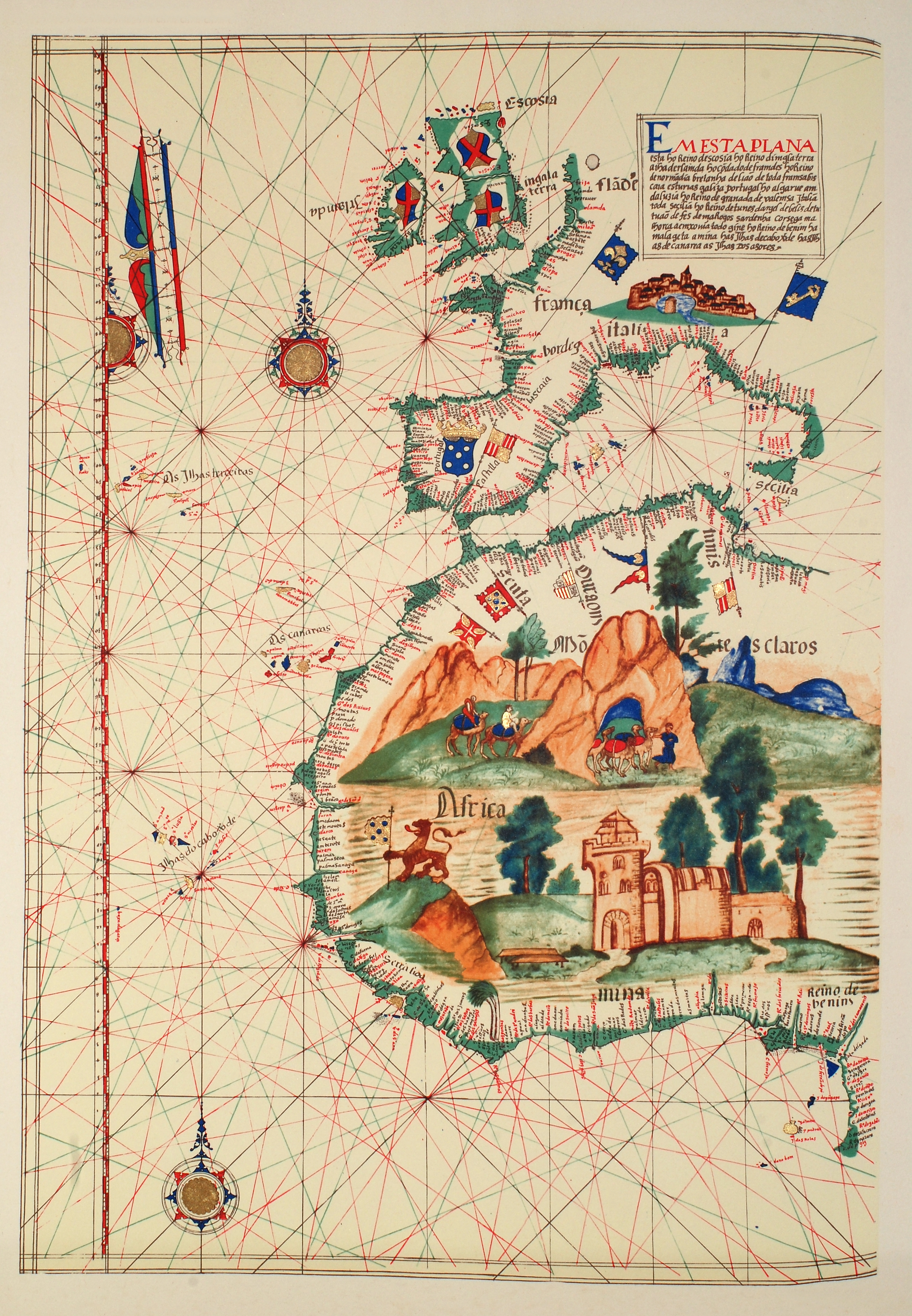
A map with Elmina Castle ("Mina"), Ghana, one in a chain of about fifty fortified factories to enforce Portuguese trade rule along the coast, 1563.

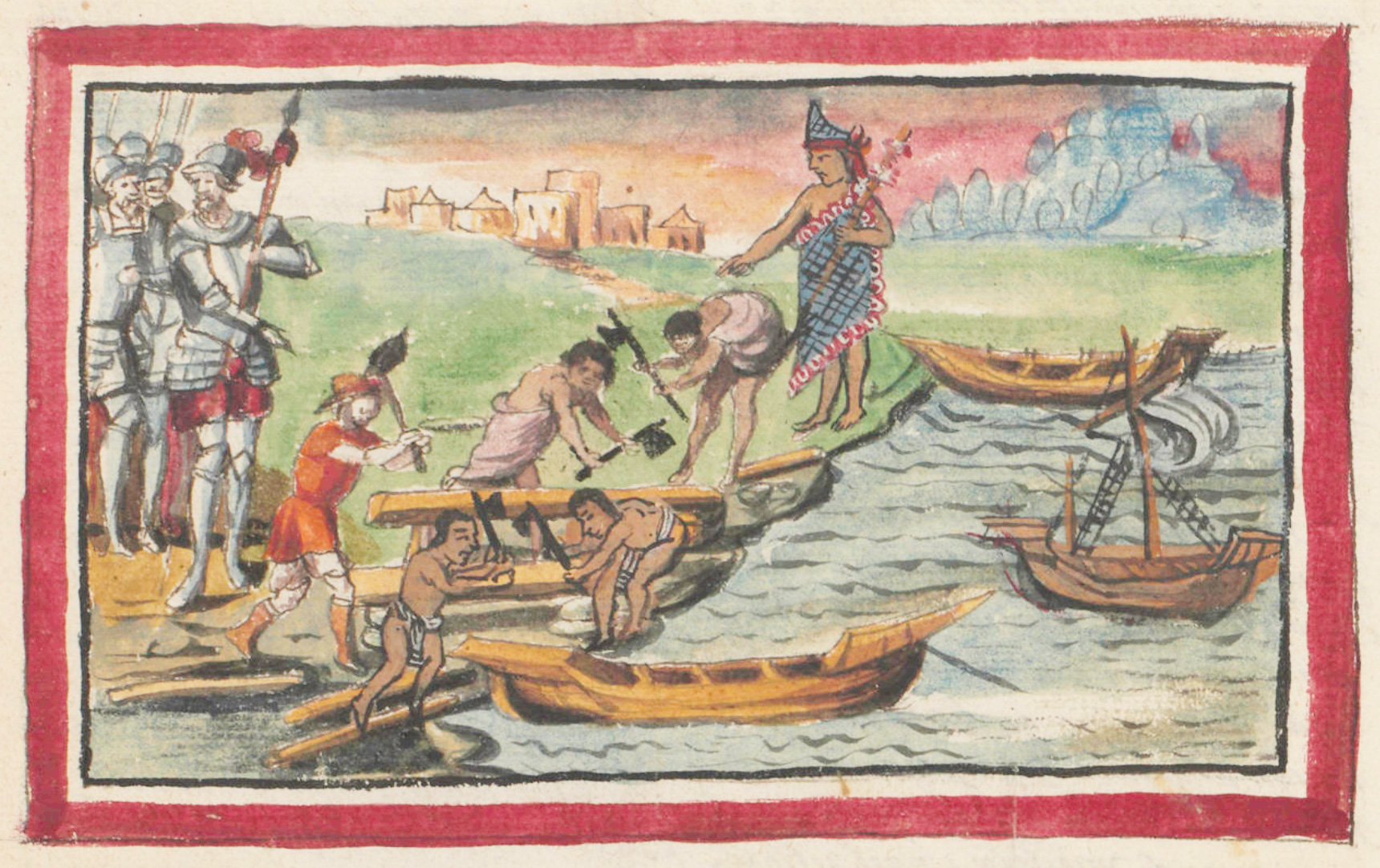
Preparations before the Fall of Tenochtitlan, Codex Durán.

European colonization of both Eastern and Western Hemispheres has its roots in Portuguese exploration. There were financial and religious motives behind this exploration. By finding the source of the lucrative spice trade, the Portuguese could reap its profits for themselves. They would also be able to probe the existence of the fabled Christian kingdom of Prester John, with an eye to encircling the Islamic Ottoman Empire, itself gaining territories and colonies in Eastern Europe. The first foothold outside of Europe was gained with the conquest of Ceuta in 1415. During the 15th century, Portuguese sailors discovered the Atlantic islands of Madeira, Azores, and Cape Verde, which were duly populated, and pressed progressively further along the west African coast until Bartolomeu Dias demonstrated it was possible to sail around Africa by rounding the Cape of Good Hope in 1488, paving the way for Vasco da Gama to reach India in 1498.

Portuguese successes led to Spanish financing of a mission by Christopher Columbus in 1492 to explore an alternative route to Asia, by sailing west. When Columbus eventually made landfall in the Caribbean Antilles he believed he had reached the coast of India, and that the people he encountered there were Indians with red skin. This is why Native Americans have been called Indians or red-Indians. In truth, Columbus had arrived on a continent that was new to the Europeans, the Americas. After Columbus' first trips, competing Spanish and Portuguese claims to new territories and sea routes were solved with the Treaty of Tordesillas in 1494, which divided the world outside of Europe in two areas of trade and exploration, between the Iberian kingdoms of Castile and Portugal along a north-south meridian, 370 leagues west of Cape Verde. According to this international agreement, the larger part of the Americas and the Pacific Ocean were open to Spanish exploration and colonization, while Africa, the Indian Ocean, and most of Asia were assigned to Portugal.

In 1521, the Portuguese took control of Bahrain under the command of António Correia, making it the first country in the Middle East to be fully colonised by a European power. During the same year of 1521, the boundaries specified by the Treaty of Tordesillas were put to the test when Ferdinand Magellan and his Spanish sailors (among other Europeans), sailing for the Spanish Crown became the first European to cross the Pacific Ocean, reaching Guam and the Philippines, parts of which the Portuguese had already explored, sailing from the Indian Ocean. The two by now global empires, which had set out from opposing directions, had finally met on the other side of the world. The conflicts that arose between both powers were finally solved with the Treaty of Zaragoza in 1529, which defined the areas of Spanish and Portuguese influence in Asia, establishing the anti-meridian, or line of demarcation on the other side of the world.

During the 16th century, the Portuguese continued to press both eastwards and westwards into the Oceans. Towards Asia they made the first direct contact between Europeans and the peoples inhabiting such present day countries as Mozambique, Madagascar, Sri Lanka, Malaysia, Indonesia, East Timor (1512), China, and finally Japan. In the opposite direction, the Portuguese colonized a huge territory that eventually became Brasil, and the Spanish conquistadors established the vast Viceroyalties of New Spain and Peru, and later of Río de la Plata (Argentina) and New Granada (Colombia). In Asia, the Portuguese encountered ancient and well populated societies, and established a seaborne empire consisting of armed coastal trading posts along their trade routes (such as Goa, Hormuz, Malacca, and Macau), so they had relatively little cultural impact on the societies they engaged. In the Western Hemisphere, the European colonization involved the emigration of large numbers of settlers, soldiers and administrators intent on owning land and exploiting the apparently primitive Indigenous peoples of the Americas. The result was that the colonization of the New World was catastrophic: native peoples were no match for European technology, ruthlessness, or their diseases which decimated the Indigenous population.

Spanish treatment of the indigenous populations caused a fierce debate, the Valladolid Controversy, over whether Indians possessed souls and if so, whether they were entitled to the basic rights of mankind. Bartolomé de Las Casas, author of A Short Account of the Destruction of the Indies, championed the cause of the native peoples, and was opposed by "Juan Ginés de Sepúlveda", who claimed Amerindians were "natural slaves".

The Roman Catholic Church played a large role in Spanish and Portuguese overseas activities. The Dominicans, Jesuits, and Franciscans, notably Francis Xavier in Asia and Junípero Serra in North America were particularly active in this endeavor. Many buildings erected by the Jesuits still stands. Buildings such as the Cathedral of Saint Paul in Macau and the Santisima Trinidad de Paraná in Paraguay, the latter an example of the Jesuit Reductions. The Dominican and Franciscan buildings of California's missions and New Mexico's missions stand restored, such as Mission Santa Barbara in Santa Barbara, California and San Francisco de Asis Mission Church in Ranchos de Taos, New Mexico.

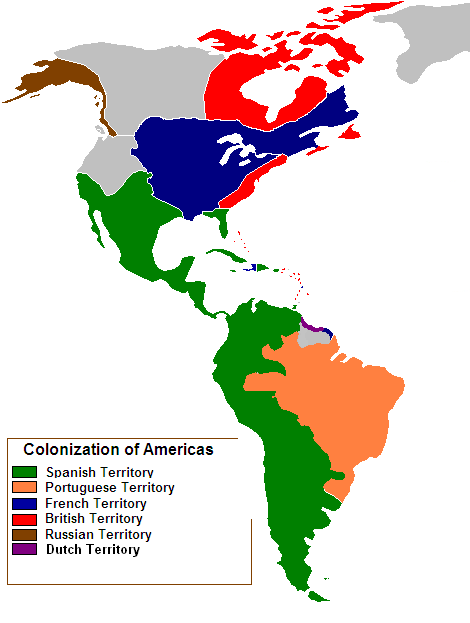
Map indicating the territories colonized by the European powers over the Americas in 1750 (mainly Spain, Portugal, and France at the time).

As characteristically happens in any colonialism, European or not, previous or subsequent, both Spain and Portugal profited handsomely from their newfound overseas colonies: the Spanish from gold and silver from mines such as Potosí and Zacatecas in New Spain, the Portuguese from the huge markups they enjoyed as trade intermediaries, particularly during the Nanban Japan trade period. The influx of precious metals to the Spanish monarchy's coffers allowed it to finance costly religious wars in Europe which ultimately proved its economic undoing: the supply of metals was not infinite and the large inflow caused inflation and debt, and subsequently affected the rest of Europe.

=== Northern European challenges to the Iberian hegemony ===
It was not long before the exclusivity of Iberian claims to the Americas was challenged by other up and coming European powers, primarily the Netherlands, France and England: the view taken by the rulers of these nations is epitomized by the quotation attributed to Francis I of France demanding to be shown the clause in Adam's will excluding his authority from the New World. This challenge initially took the form of piratical attacks (such as those by Francis Drake) on Spanish treasure fleets or coastal settlements. Later the Northern European countries began establishing settlements of their own, primarily in areas that were outside of Spanish interests, such as what is now the eastern seaboard of the United States and Canada, or islands in the Caribbean, such as Aruba, Martinique, and Barbados, that had been abandoned by the Spanish in favor of the mainland and larger islands.

Whereas Spanish colonialism was based on the religious conversion and exploitation of local populations via encomiendas (many Spaniards emigrated to the Americas to elevate their social status, and were not interested in manual labor), Northern European colonialism was bolstered by those emigrating for broader religious reasons (for example, the Mayflower voyage). The motive for emigration was not to become an aristocrat or to spread one's faith but to start a new society afresh, structured according to the colonist's wishes. The most populous emigration of the 17th century was that of the English, who after a series of wars with the Dutch and French came to dominate the Thirteen Colonies on the eastern coast of the present-day United States and other colonies such as Newfoundland and Rupert's Land in what is now Canada.

However, the English, French, and Dutch were no more averse to making a profit than the Spanish and Portuguese, and whilst their areas of settlement in the Americas proved to be devoid of the precious metals found by the Spanish, trade in other commodities and products that could be sold at a massive profit in Europe provided another reason for crossing the Atlantic, in particular, furs from Canada, tobacco, and cotton grown in Virginia and sugar in the islands of the Caribbean and Brazil. Due to the massive depletion of indigenous labor, plantation owners had to look elsewhere for manpower for these labor- intensive crops. They turned to the centuries-old slave trade of west Africa and began transporting Africans across the Atlantic on a massive scale – historians estimate that the Atlantic slave trade brought between 10 and 12 million black African slaves to the New World. The islands of the Caribbean soon came to be populated by slaves of African descent, ruled over by a white minority of plantation owners interested in making a fortune and then returning to their home country to spend it.

=== Role of companies in early colonialism ===
From its very outset, Western colonialism was operated as a joint public-private venture. Columbus' voyages to the Americas were partially funded by Italian investors, but whereas the Spanish state maintained a tight rein on trade with its colonies (by law, the colonies could only trade with one designated port in the mother country and treasure was brought back in special convoys), the English, French and Dutch granted what were effectively trade monopolies to joint-stock companies such as the East India Companies and the Hudson's Bay Company.

Imperial Russia had no state-sponsored expeditions or colonization in the Americas, but did charter the first Russian joint-stock commercial enterprise, the Russian America Company, which did sponsor those activities in its territories.

=== European colonies in India ===
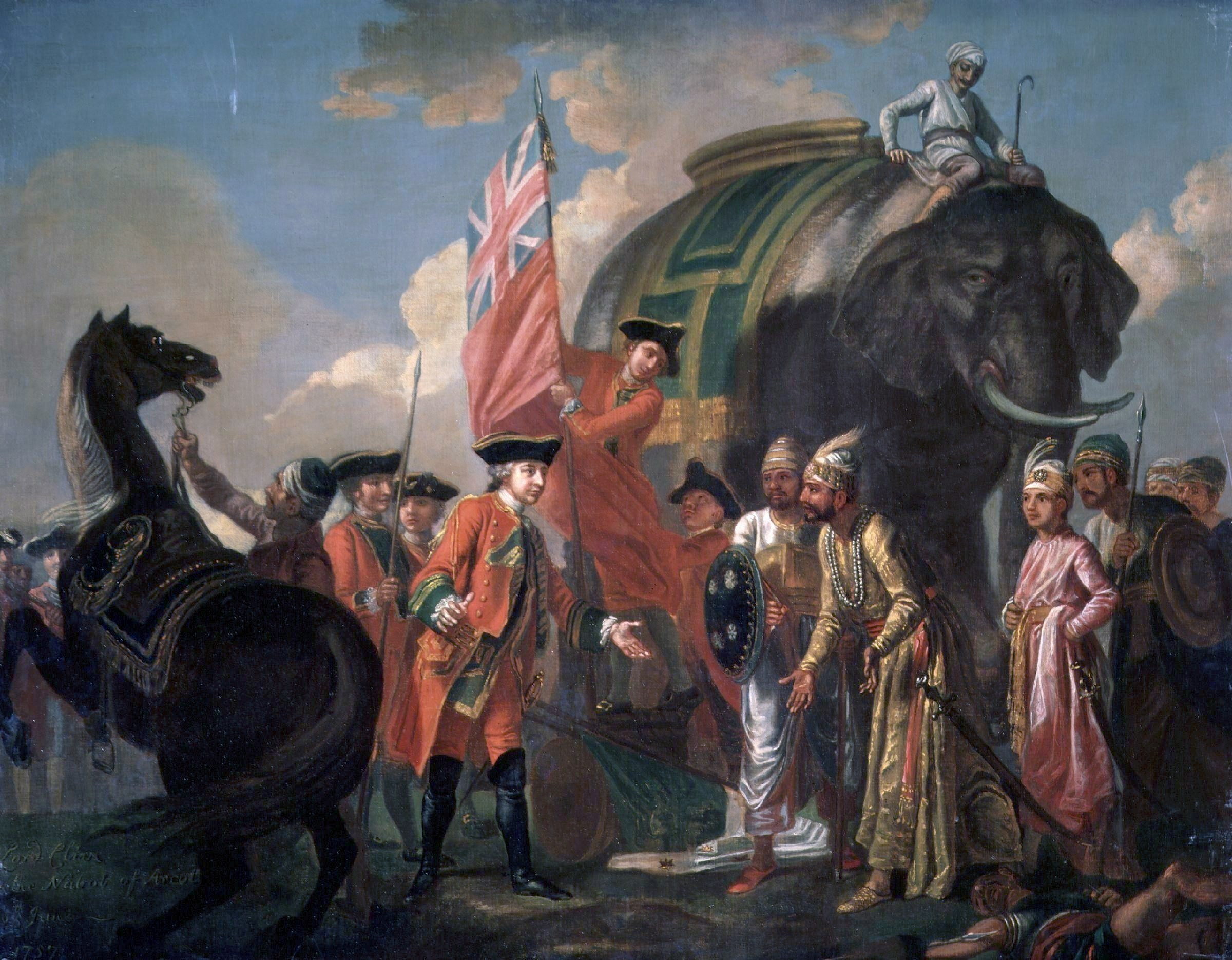
Lord Clive meeting with Mir Jafar at the Battle of Plassey in 1757, painted by Francis Hayman

In May 1498, the Portuguese set foot in Kozhikode in Kerala, making them the first Europeans to sail to India. Rivalry among reigning European powers saw the entry of the Dutch, English, French, Danish and others. The kingdoms of India were gradually taken over by the Europeans and indirectly controlled by puppet rulers. In 1600, Queen Elizabeth I accorded a charter, forming the East India Company to trade with India and eastern Asia. The English landed in India in Surat in 1612. By the 19th century, they had assumed direct and indirect control over most of India.

== Imperial Russia: Central Asia and Siberia (16th–20th century) ==
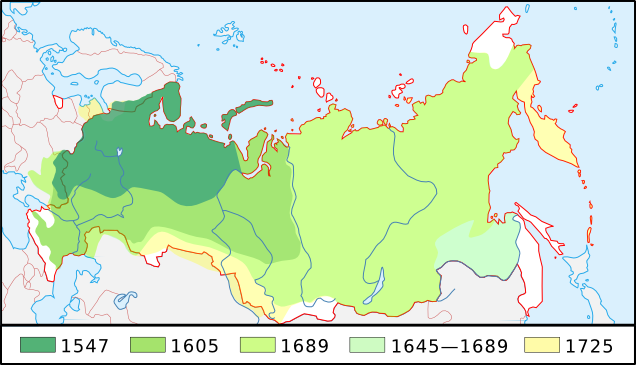
Territorial evolution of Russia from 1547 to 1725

After a period of political instability, the Romanovs came to power in 1613 and the expansion-colonization process of Russia continued. While western Europe colonized the New World, Russia expanded overland – to the east, north and south. This continued for centuries; by the end of the 19th century, the Russian Empire reached from the Black Sea to the Pacific Ocean, and for some time included colonies in the Alaska (1732–1867) and a short-lived unofficial colony in Africa (1889) in present-day Djibouti. The acquisition of new territories, especially in the Caucasus, had an invigorating effect on the rest of Russia. According to two Russian historians:

the culture of Russia and that of the Caucasian peoples interacted in a reciprocally beneficial manner. The turbulent tenor of life in the Caucasus, the mountain peoples' love of freedom, and their willingness to die for independence were felt far beyond the local interaction of the Caucasian peoples and coresident Russians: they injected a potent new spirit into the thinking and creative work of Russia's progressives, strengthened the liberationist aspirations of Russian writers and exiled Decembrists, and influenced distinguished Russian democrats, poets, and prose writers, including Alexander Griboyedov, Alexander Pushkin, Mikhail Lermontov, and Leo Tolstoy. These writers, who generally supported the Caucasian fight for liberation, went beyond the chauvinism of the colonial autocracy and rendered the Caucasian peoples' cultures accessible to the Russian intelligentsia. At the same time, Russian culture exerted an influence on Caucasian cultures, bolstering positive aspects while weakening the impact of the Caucasian peoples' reactionary feudalism and reducing the internecine fighting between tribes and clans.

=== Expansion into the East ===
The first stage to 1650 was an expansion eastward from the Ural Mountains to the Pacific Ocean. Geographical expeditions mapped much of Siberia. The second stage from 1785 to 1830 looked south to the areas between the Black Sea and the Caspian Sea. The key areas were Armenia and Georgia, with some better penetration of the Ottoman Empire, and Persia. By 1829, Russia controlled all of the Caucasus as shown in the Treaty of Adrianople of 1829. The third era, 1850 to 1860, was a brief interlude jumping to the East Coast, annexing the region from the Amur River to Manchuria. The fourth era, 1865 to 1885 incorporated Turkestan, and the northern approaches to India, sparking British fears of a threat to India in the Great Game.

== First decolonization: Independence in the Americas (1770–1820) ==
During the five decades following 1770, Britain, France, Spain, and Portugal lost many of their possessions in the Americas.

=== Britain and the Thirteen Colonies ===
After the conclusion of the Seven Years' War in 1763, Britain had emerged as the world's dominant power but found itself mired in debt and struggling to finance the Navy and Army necessary to maintain a global empire. The British Parliament attempt to raise taxes from North American colonists raised fears among the Americans that their rights as "Englishmen", and particularly their rights of self-government, were in danger.

From 1765, a series of disputes with Parliament over taxation led to the American Revolution, first to informal committees of correspondence among the colonies, then to coordinated protest and resistance, with an important event in 1770, the Boston Massacre. A standing army was formed by the United Colonies, and independence was declared by the Second Continental Congress on 4 July 1776. A new nation was born, the United States of America, and all royal officials were expelled. On their own the Patriots captured a British Invasion army and France recognized the new nation, formed a military alliance, declared war on Britain, and left the superpower without any major ally. The American War of Independence continued until 1783 when the Treaty of Paris was signed. Britain recognized the sovereignty of the United States over the territory bounded by the British possessions to the North, Florida to the South, and the Mississippi River to the west.

=== France and the Haitian Revolution (1791–1804) ===
The Haitian Revolution, a slave revolt led by Toussaint L'Ouverture in the French colony of Saint-Domingue, established Haïti as a free, black republic, the first of its kind. Haiti became the second independent nation that was a former European colony in the Western Hemisphere after the United States. Africans and people of African ancestry freed themselves from slavery and colonization by taking advantage of the conflict among whites over how to implement the reforms of the French Revolution in this slave society. Although independence was declared in 1804, it was not until 1825 that it was formally recognized by King Charles X of France.

=== Spain and the Wars of Independence in Latin America ===
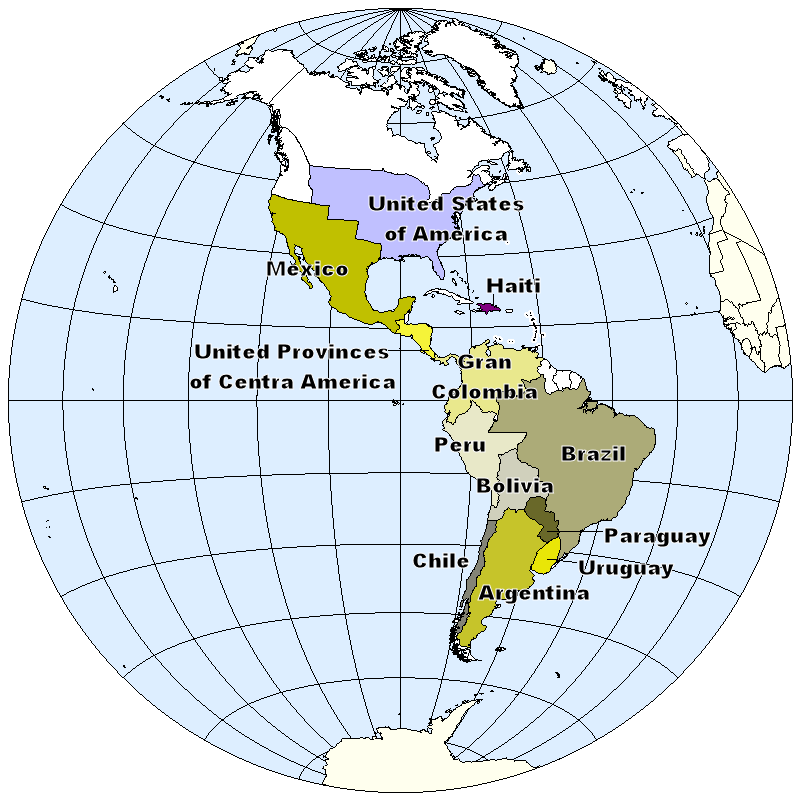
Independent states in the Americas, c. 1830.

The gradual decline of Spain as an imperial power throughout the 17th century was hastened by the War of the Spanish Succession (1701–14), as a result of which it lost its European imperial possessions. The death knell for the Spanish Empire in the Americas was Napoleon's invasion of the Iberian peninsula in 1808. With the installation of his brother Joseph on the Spanish throne, the main tie between the metropole and its colonies in the Americas, the Spanish monarchy, had been cut, leading the colonists to question their continued subordination to a declining and distant country. With an eye on the events of the American Revolution forty years earlier, revolutionary leaders began bloody wars of independence against Spain, whose armies were ultimately unable to maintain control. By 1831, Spain had been ejected from the mainland of the Americas, leaving a collection of independent republics that stretched from Chile and Argentina in the south to Mexico in the north. Spain's colonial possessions were reduced to Cuba, Puerto Rico, the Philippines, and a number of small islands in the Pacific, all of which she was to lose to the United States in the 1898 Spanish–American War or sell to Germany shortly thereafter.

=== Portugal and Brazil ===
Brazil was the only country in Latin America to gain its independence without bloodshed. The invasion of Portugal by Napoleon in 1808 had forced King João VI to escape to Brazil and establish his court in Rio de Janeiro. For thirteen years, Portugal was ruled from Brazil (the only instance of such a reversal of roles between colony and metropole) until his return to Portugal in 1821. His son, Dom Pedro, was left in charge of Brazil and in 1822 he declared independence from Portugal and himself the Emperor of Brazil. Unlike Spain's former colonies which had abandoned the monarchy in favor of republicanism, Brazil, therefore retained its links with its monarchy, the House of Braganza.

== Indian subcontinent and the British Raj (18th century–1947) ==
Vasco da Gama's maritime success to discover for Europeans a new sea route to India in 1498 paved the way for direct Indo-European commerce. The Portuguese soon set up trading-posts in Goa, Daman, Diu and Bombay. The next to arrive were the Dutch, the English—who set up a trading post in the west-coast port of Surat in 1619—and the French. The internal conflicts among Indian Kingdoms gave opportunities to the European traders to gradually establish political influence and appropriate lands. Although these continental European powers were to control various regions of southern and eastern India during the ensuing century, they would eventually lose all their territories in India to the British, with the exception of the French outposts of Pondicherry and Chandernagore, the Dutch port in Travancore, and the Portuguese colonies of Goa, Daman, and Diu.

=== The British in India ===
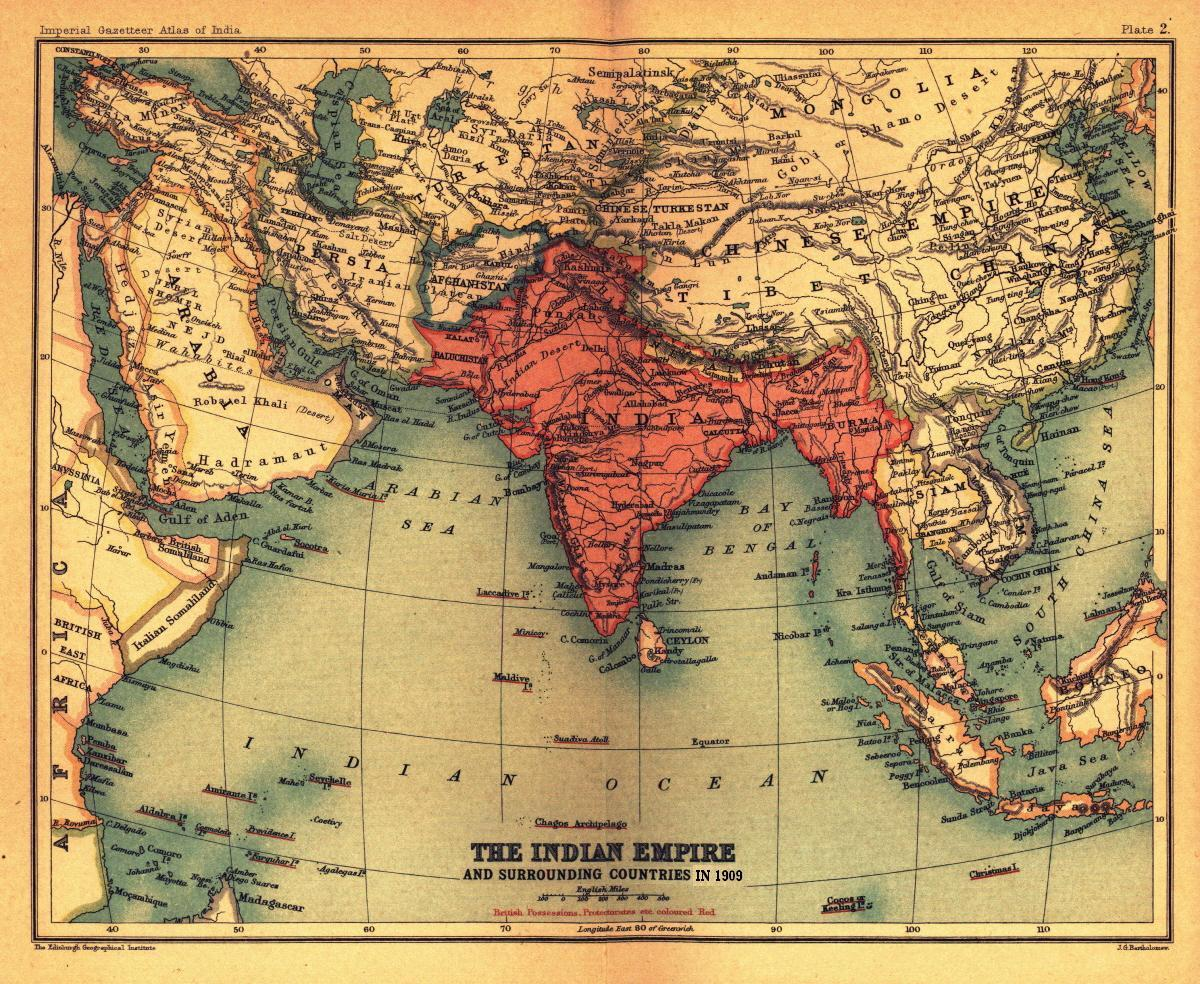
The British Indian Empire and surrounding countries in 1909

The English East India Company had been given permission by the Mughal emperor Jahangir in 1617 to trade in India. Gradually the company's increasing influence led the de jure Mughal emperor Farrukh Siyar to grant them dastaks or permits for duty-free trade in Bengal in 1717. The Nawab of Bengal Siraj Ud Daulah, the de facto ruler of Mughal Bengal, opposed British attempts to use these permits. This led to the Battle of Plassey in 1757, in which the armies of the East India Company, led by Robert Clive, defeated the Nawab's forces. This was the first political foothold with territorial implications that the British had acquired in India. Clive was appointed by the company as its first Governor of Bengal in 1757. This was combined with British victories over the French at Madras, Wandiwash and Pondicherry that, along with wider British successes during the Seven Years' War, reduced French influence in India. After the Battle of Buxar in 1764, the company acquired the civil rights of administration in Bengal from the Mughal Emperor Shah Alam II; it marked the beginning of its formal rule, which was to engulf eventually most of India and extinguish the Moghul rule and dynasty itself in less than a century. The East India Company monopolized the trade of Bengal. They introduced a land taxation system called the Permanent Settlement which introduced a feudal-like structure (See Zamindar) in the Bengal Presidency. By the 1850s, the East India Company controlled most of the Indian subcontinent, which included present-day Pakistan and Bangladesh. Their policy was sometimes summed up as Divide and Rule, taking advantage of the enmity festering between various princely states and social and religious groups.

The first major movement against the British Company's high-handed rule resulted in the Indian Rebellion of 1857, also known as the "Indian Mutiny" or "Sepoy Mutiny" or the "First War of Independence". After a year of turmoil, and reinforcement of the East India Company's troops with British Army soldiers, the Company overcame the rebellion. The nominal leader of the uprising, the last Mughal emperor Bahadur Shah Zafar, was exiled to Burma, his children were beheaded and the Moghul line was abolished. In the aftermath all power was transferred from the East India Company to the British Crown, which began to administer most of India as a colony; the company's lands were controlled directly and the rest through the rulers of what it called the Princely states. There were 565 princely states when the Indian subcontinent gained independence from Britain in August 1947.

During period of the British Raj, famines in India, often attributed to El Nino droughts and failed government policies, were some of the worst ever recorded, including the Great Famine of 1876–78, in which 6.1 million to 10.3 million people died and the Indian famine of 1899–1900, in which 1.25 to 10 million people died. The Third Plague Pandemic started in China in the middle of the 19th century, spreading plague to all inhabited continents and killing 10 million people in India alone. Despite persistent diseases and famines, however, the population of the Indian subcontinent, which stood at about 125 million in 1750, had reached 389 million by 1941.

=== Other European empires in India ===
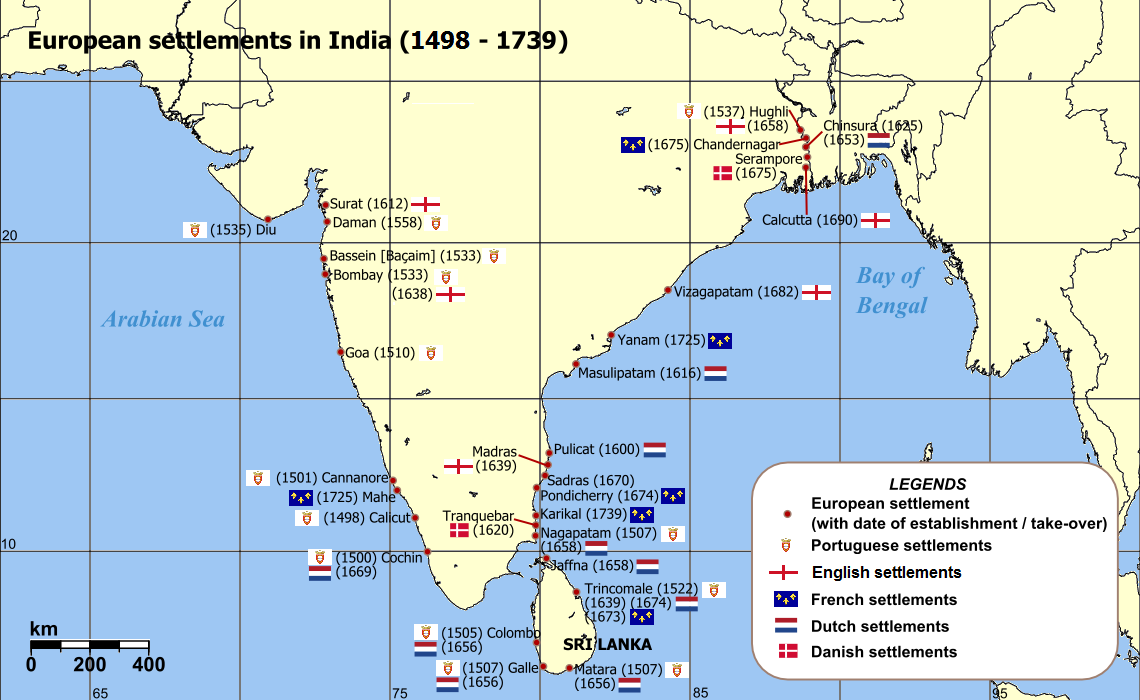
European settlements in India (1501–1739)

Like the other European colonists, the French began their colonization via commercial activities, starting with the establishment of a factory in Surat in 1668. The French started to settle down in India in 1673, beginning with the purchase of land at Chandernagore from the Mughal Governor of Bengal, followed by the acquisition of Pondicherry from the Sultan of Bijapur the next year. Both became the centers of the maritime commercial activities that the French conducted in India. The French also had trading posts in Mahe, Karikal and Yanaon. Similar to the situation in Tahiti and Martinique, the French colonial administrative area was insular, but, in India, the French authority was isolated on the peripheries of a British-dominated territory.

By the early eighteenth century, the French had become the chief European rivals of the British. During the eighteenth century, it was highly possible for the Indian subcontinent to have succumbed to French control, but the defeat inflicted on them in the Seven Years War (1756–1763) permanently curtailed French ambitions. The Treaty of Paris of 1763 restored the original five to the French while making it clear that France could not expand its control beyond these areas.

The beginning of the Portuguese occupation of India can be traced back to the arrival of Vasco da Gama near Calicut on 20 May 1498. Soon after this, other explorers, traders and missionaries followed. By 1515, the Portuguese were the strongest naval power in the Indian Ocean and the Malabar Coast was dominated by them.

== New Imperialism: Africa and East Asia (1870–1914) ==
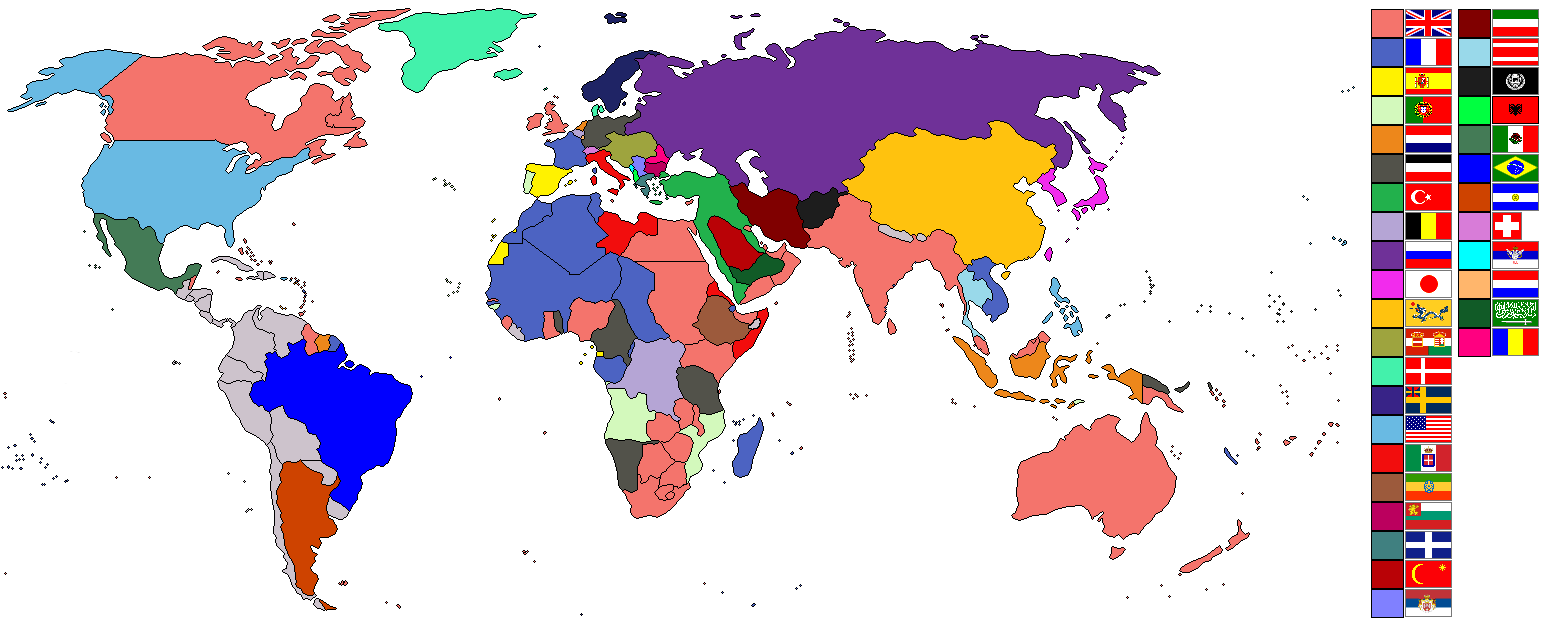
Empires of the world in 1910

The policy and ideology of European colonial expansion between the 1870s (circa opening of Suez Canal and Second Industrial Revolution) and the outbreak of World War I in 1914 are often characterized as the "New Imperialism". The period is distinguished by an unprecedented pursuit of what has been termed "empire for empire's sake," aggressive competition for overseas territorial acquisitions, and the emergence in colonizing countries of doctrines of racial superiority which denied the fitness of subjugated peoples for self-government.

During this period, Europe's powers added nearly 8,880,000 square miles (23,000,000 km^{2}) to their overseas colonial possessions. As it was mostly unoccupied by the Western powers as late as the 1880s, Africa became the primary target of the "new" imperialist expansion (known as the Scramble for Africa), although conquest took place also in other areas – notably south-east Asia and the East Asian seaboard, where Japan joined the European powers' scramble for territory.

The Berlin Conference (1884–1885) mediated the imperial competition among Britain, France, and Germany, defining "effective occupation" as the criterion for international recognition of colonial claims and codifying the imposition of direct rule, accomplished usually through armed force.

In Germany, rising pan-Germanism was coupled to imperialism in the Alldeutsche Verband ("Pan-Germanic League"), which argued that Britain's world power position gave the British unfair advantages on international markets, thus limiting Germany's economic growth and threatening its security.

Asking whether colonies paid, economic historian Grover Clark argues an emphatic "No!" He reports that in every case the support cost, especially the military system necessary to support and defend the colonies outran the total trade they produced. Apart from the British Empire, they have not favored destinations for the immigration of surplus populations.

=== The Scramble for Africa ===
European territories in Africa, 1914, following the Scramble for Africa.

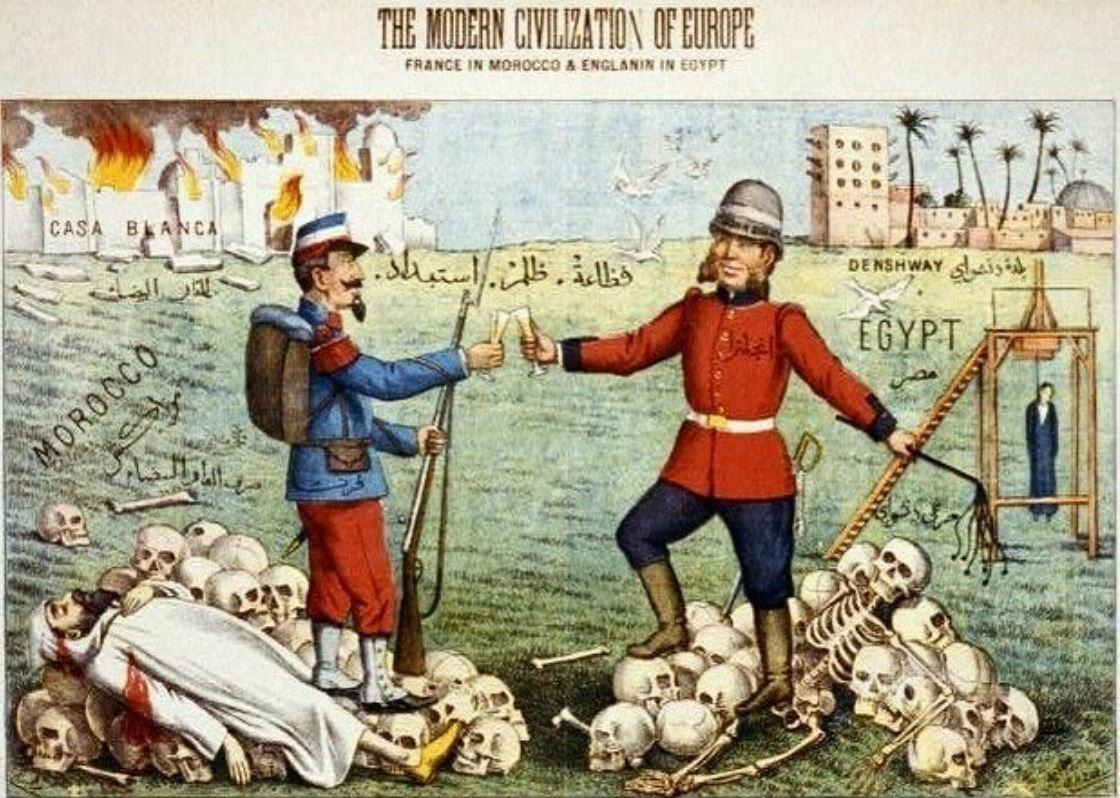
Satirical drawing: "The modern civilization of Europe: France in Morocco & England in Egypt", A. H. Zaki, 1908–1914

Africa was the target of the third wave of European colonialism, after that of the Americas and Asia. Many European statesmen and industrialists wanted to accelerate the Scramble for Africa, securing colonies before they strictly needed them. As a champion of Realpolitik, Bismarck disliked colonies and thought they were a waste of time, but his hand was forced by pressure from both the elites and the general population which considered the colonization a necessity for German prestige. German colonies in Togoland, Samoa, South-West Africa, and New Guinea had corporate commercial roots, while the equivalent German-dominated areas in East Africa and China owed more to political motives. The British also took an interest in Africa, using the East Africa Company to take over what is now Kenya and Uganda. The British crown formally took over in 1895 and renamed the area the East Africa Protectorate.

Leopold II of Belgium personally owned the Congo Free State from 1885 to 1908, under his rule many atrocities were committed. Round after round of international scandal regarding the brutal treatment of native workers forced the Belgium government to take full ownership and responsibility.

The Dutch Empire continued to hold the Dutch East Indies, which was one of the few profitable overseas colonies.

In the same manner, Italy tried to conquer its "place in the sun", acquiring Somaliland in 1899–1890, Eritrea and 1899, and, taking advantage of the "Sick man of Europe", the Ottoman Empire, also conquered Tripolitania and Cyrenaica (modern Libya) with the 1911 Italo–Turkish War. The conquest of Ethiopia, which had remained the last African independent territory, had to wait until the Second Italo–Abyssinian War in 1935–1936 (the First Italo–Ethiopian War in 1895–96 had ended in defeat for Italy).

The Portuguese and Spanish colonial empire were smaller, mostly legacies of past colonization. Most of their colonies had acquired independence during the Latin American revolutions at the beginning of the 19th century.

=== Imperialism in Asia ===
In Asia, the Great Game, which lasted from 1813 to 1907, opposed the British Empire against Imperial Russia for supremacy in Central Asia. China was opened to Western influence starting with the First and Second Opium Wars (1839–1842; 1856–1860). After the visits of Commodore Matthew Perry in 1852–1854, Japan opened itself to the Western world during the Meiji period (1868–1912).

Imperialism also took place in Burma, Indonesia, Malaya and the Philippines. Burma had been under British rule for nearly a hundred years, however, it was always considered an "imperial backwater". This accounts for the fact that Burma does not have an obvious colonial legacy and is not a part of the Commonwealth. In the beginning, in the mid-1820s, Burma was administered from Penang in Britain's Straits Settlements. However, it was soon brought within British India, of which it remained a part until 1937. Burma was governed as a province of India, not considered very important, and barely any accommodation was made to Burmese political culture or sensitivities. As reforms began to move India towards independence, Burma was simply dragged along.

== Interwar period and World War II (1918–1945) ==
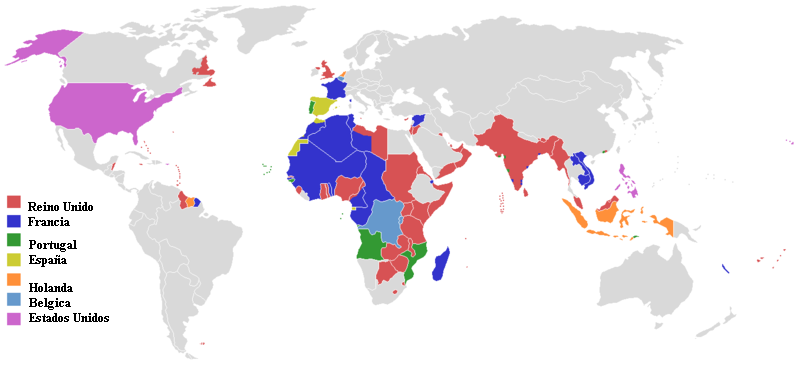
World map of colonization at the end of the Second World War in 1945

The colonial map was redrawn following the defeat of the German Empire and the Ottoman Empire after the World War I (1914–18). Colonies from the defeated empires were transferred to the newly founded League of Nations, which itself redistributed it to the victorious powers as "mandates". The secret 1916 Sykes–Picot Agreement partitioned the Middle East between Britain and France. French mandates included Syria and Lebanon, whilst the British were granted Iraq and Palestine. The bulk of the Arabian Peninsula became the independent Kingdom of Saudi Arabia in 1922. The discovery of the world's largest easily accessible crude oil deposits led to an influx of Western oil companies that dominated the region's economies until the 1970s, and making the emirs of the oil states immensely rich, enabling them to consolidate their hold on power and giving them a stake in preserving Western hegemony over the region. During the 1920 and 1930s Iraq, Syria and Egypt moved towards independence, although the British and French did not formally depart the region until they were forced to do so after World War II.

=== Japanese imperialism ===
The Empire of Japan in 1939

For Japan, the second half of the nineteenth century was a period of internal turmoil succeeded by a period of rapid development. After being closed for centuries to Western influence, Japan was forced by the United States to open itself to the West during the Meiji Era (1868–1912), characterized by swift modernization and borrowings from European culture (in law, science, etc.) This, in turn, helped make Japan the modern power that it is now, which was symbolized as soon as the 1904–1905 Russo–Japanese War: this war marked the first victory of an Asian power against a European imperial power, and led to widespread fears among European populations. During the first part of the 20th century, while China was still subject to various European imperialisms, Japan became an imperialist power, conquering what it called a "Greater East Asia Co-Prosperity Sphere".

With the final revision of treaties in 1894, Japan may be considered to have joined the family of nations on a basis of equality with the western states. From this same time imperialism became a dominant motive in Japanese policy.

Imperial Japan won conflicts against the Qing dynasty and gained control of Korea and Taiwan when the Treaty of Shimonoseki was concluded in 1895. In 1910, Korea was formally annexed by the Empire of Japan. The Japanese colonization of Korea saw rapid modernization of the peninsula and there was brutal treatment of civilians such as Korean comfort women who were forced to serve in brothels for the Imperial Japanese Armed Forces.

In 1931, Japanese army units based in Manchuria seized control of the region and created the puppet state of Manchukuo. Full-scale war with China followed in 1937, drawing Japan toward an overambitious bid for Asian hegemony (Greater East Asia Co-Prosperity Sphere), which ultimately led to defeat and the loss of all its overseas territories after World War II (see Japanese expansionism and Japanese nationalism). The Imperial Japanese Army committed atrocities exemplified by the Nanjing Massacre.

=== Nazi Germany ===
Proposed boundaries of the "Greater Germanic Reich" (including possible satellites and protectorates), according to the Institute of Contemporary History in Munich: Greater Germanic Reich Satellite states States dependent upon the Reich

Lebensraum (German pronunciation: [ˈleːbənsˌʁaʊm], lit. 'living space') is a German concept of expansionism and Völkisch nationalism, the philosophy and policies of which were common to German politics from the 1890s to the 1940s. First popularized around 1901, Lebensraum became a geopolitical goal of the German Empire in World War I (1914–1918), as the core element of the Septemberprogramm of territorial expansion. The most extreme form of this ideology was promoted and initiated by the Nazi Party, that had ruled Nazi Germany, whose ultimate goal of which was to establish a Greater German Reich. Lebensraum was a leading motivation of Nazi Germany to initiate World War II, and it would continue this policy until the end of the conflict.

Following Adolf Hitler's rise to power, Lebensraum became an ideological principle of Nazism and provided justification for the German territorial expansion into Central and Eastern Europe. The Nazi policy Generalplan Ost (lit. 'Master Plan for the East') was based on its tenets. It stipulated that Germany required a Lebensraum necessary for its survival and that most of the populations of Central and Eastern Europe would have to be removed permanently (either through mass deportation to Siberia, extermination, or enslavement), including Polish, Ukrainian, Russian, Belarusian, Czech, and other Slavic nations considered non-Aryan. The Nazi government aimed at repopulating these lands with Germanic colonists in the name of Lebensraum during and following World War II. Entire populations were ravaged by starvation; any agricultural surplus was used to feed Germany. The Jewish population was to be exterminated outright.

Hitler's strategic program for Greater Germany was based on the belief in the power of Lebensraum, especially when pursued by a racially superior society. People deemed to be part of non-Aryan races, within the territory of Lebensraum expansion, were subjected to expulsion or destruction. The eugenics of Lebensraum assumed it to be the right of the German Aryan master race (Herrenvolk) to remove the indigenous people in the name of their own living space. They took inspiration for this concept from outside Germany, particularly the European colonization of North America. Hitler and Nazi officials took a particular interest in manifest destiny, and attempted to replicate it in occupied Europe. Nazi Germany also supported other Axis powers' expansionist ideologies such as Fascist Italy's spazio vitale and the Empire of Japan's hakkō ichiu.

=== Fascist Italy ===
Imperialism, colonialism and irredentism played an important role in the foreign policy of Fascist Italy. These included both ethnic-nationalist irredentist claims and frivolous foreign adventures intended to artificially raise the regime’s prestige. Among the regime's goals were the acquisition of territory considered historically Italian in France (e.g. Nice) and Yugoslavia (e.g. Dalmatia), the expansion of Italy's sphere of influence into the Balkans (e.g. Greece) and the acquisition of more colonies in Africa. The pacification of Libya (1923–32), the invasion of Ethiopia (1935–36), the invasion of Albania (1939), the invasion of France (1940), the invasion of Greece (1940–41) and the invasion of Yugoslavia (1941) were all undertaken in part to add to Italy's national space. According to historian Patrick Bernhard, Fascist Italian imperialism under Benito Mussolini, particularly in Africa, served as a model for the much more famous expansionism of Nazi Germany in Eastern Europe.

== Second decolonization: Worldwide (1945–1999) ==
Dates of independence of African countries.

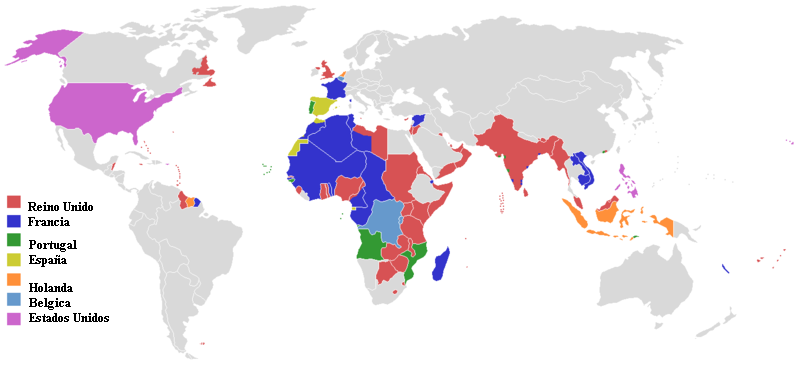
World map of colonization at the end of the Second World War in 1945

Anti-colonialist movements had begun to gain momentum after the close of World War I, which had seen colonial troops fight alongside those of the metropole, and U.S. President Woodrow Wilson's speech on the Fourteen Points. However, it was not until the end of World War II that they were fully mobilized. British Prime Minister Winston Churchill and U.S. President Franklin D. Roosevelt's 1941 Atlantic Charter declared that the signatories would "respect the right of all peoples to choose the form of government under which they will live". Though Churchill subsequently claimed this applied only to those countries under Nazi occupation, rather than the British Empire, the words were not so easily retracted: for example, the legislative assembly of Britain's most important colony, India, passed a resolution stating that the Charter should apply to it too.

In 1945, the United Nations (UN) was founded when 50 nations signed the UN Charter, which included a statement of its basis in the respect for the principle of equal rights and self-determination of peoples. In 1952, demographer Alfred Sauvy coined the term "Third World" in reference to the French Third Estate. The expression distinguished nations that aligned themselves with neither the West nor the Soviet Bloc during the Cold War. In the following decades, decolonization would strengthen this group which began to be represented at the United Nations. The Third World's first international move was the 1955 Bandung Conference, led by Jawaharlal Nehru for India, Gamal Abdel Nasser for Egypt and Josip Broz Tito for Yugoslavia. The Conference, which gathered 29 countries representing over half the world's population, led to the creation of the Non-Aligned Movement in 1961.

Although the U.S. had first opposed itself to colonial empires, the Cold War concerns about Soviet influence in the Third World caused it to downplay its advocacy of popular sovereignty and decolonization. France thus received financial support in the First Indochina War (1946–54) and the U.S. did not interfere in the Algerian War of Independence (1954–62). Decolonization itself was a seemingly unstoppable process. In 1960, after a number countries gained independence, the UN had reached 99 members states: the decolonization of Africa was almost complete. In 1980, the UN had 154 member states, and in 1990, after Namibia's independence, 159 states. Hong Kong and Macau transferred sovereignty to China in 1997 and 1999 finally marked the end of European colonial era.

=== Role of the Soviet Union and China ===
The Soviet Union was a main supporter of decolonization movements and communist parties across the world that denounced imperialism and colonization. While the Non-Aligned Movement, created in 1961 following the Bandung 1955 Conference, was supposedly neutral, the "Third World" being opposed to both the "First" and the "Second" Worlds, geopolitical concerns, as well as the refusal of the U.S. to support decolonization movements against its NATO European allies, led the national liberation movements to look increasingly toward the East. However, China's appearance on the world scene, under the leadership of Mao Zedong, created a rupture between the Soviet and Chinese factions in Communist parties around the world, all of which opposed imperialism. Cuba, with Soviet financing, send combat troops to help left-wing independence movements in Angola and Mozambique.

Globally, the non-aligned movement, led by Jawaharlal Nehru (India), Josip Broz Tito (Yugoslavia) and Gamal Abdel Nasser (Egypt) tried to create a block of nations powerful enough to be dependent on neither the United States nor the Soviet Union, but finally tilted towards the Soviet Union, while smaller independence movements, both by strategic necessity and ideological choice, were supported either by Moscow or by Beijing. Few independence movements were totally independent of foreign aid. In the 1960s and 1970s, Leonid Brezhnev and Mao Zedong gave influential support to those newly African governments which many became one-party socialist states.

== Postcolonialism ==
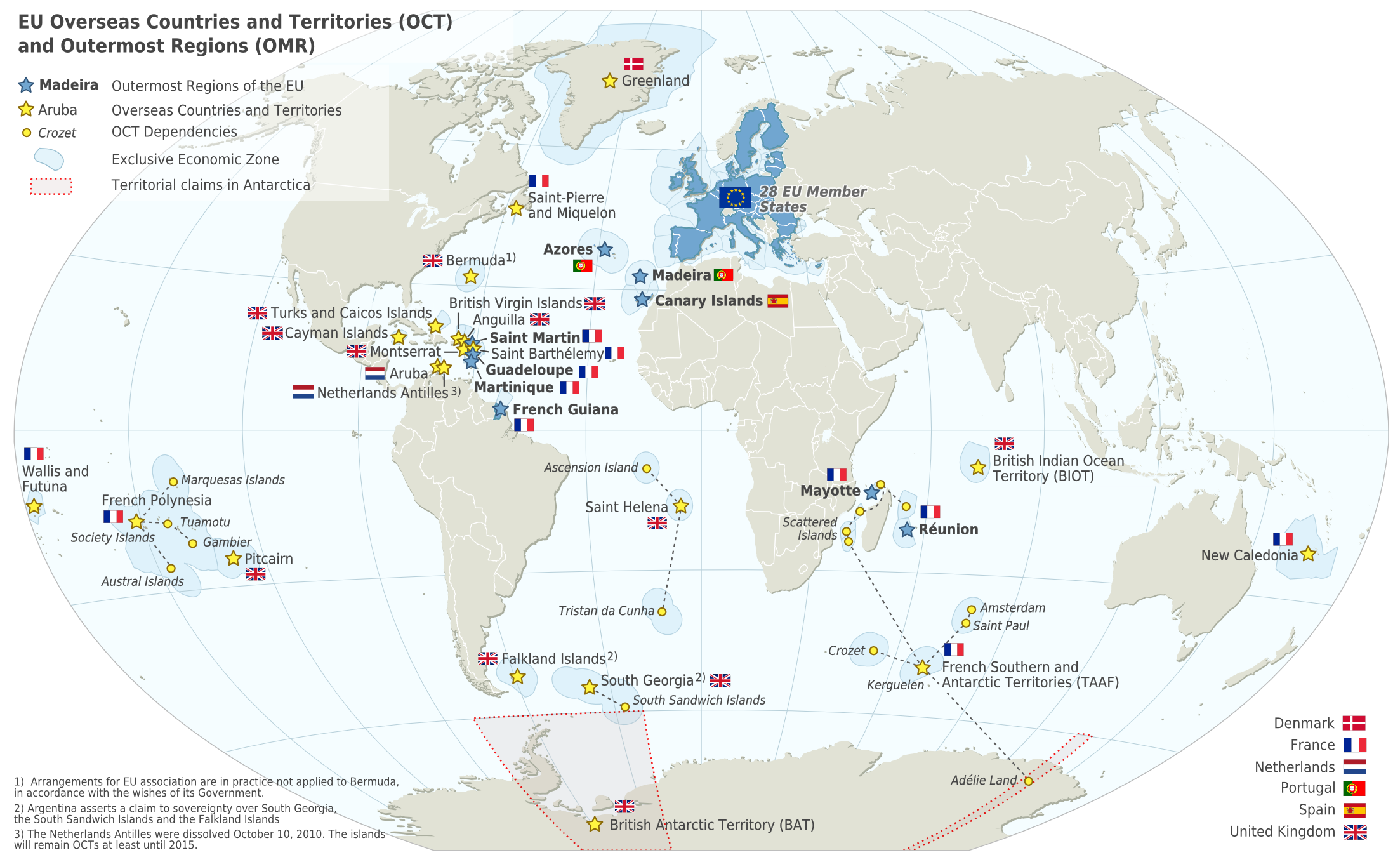
Map of the European Union in the world, with Overseas Countries and Territories and Outermost Regions

Postcolonialism is a term used to recognize the continued and troubling presence and influence of colonialism within the period designated as after-the-colonial. It refers to the ongoing effects that colonial encounters, dispossession and power have in shaping the familiar structures (social, political, spatial, uneven global interdependencies) of the present world. Postcolonialism, in itself, questions the end of colonialism.

== Neocolonialism ==
Neocolonialism is the control by a state (usually, a former colonial power) over another nominally independent state (usually, a former colony) through indirect means. The term neocolonialism was first used after World War II to refer to the continuing dependence of former colonies on foreign countries, but its meaning soon broadened to apply, more generally, to places where it was argued the power of developed countries was used to produce a level of control in some ways comparable to direct colonialism. Some scholars have argued that neocolonialism operates through global economic governance, including international financial institutions and trade regimes, which can influence domestic policy decisions in formally sovereign states through mechanisms such as debt and loan conditionalities.

Neocolonialism is argued to take the form of economic imperialism, cultural imperialism and conditional aid to influence or control a developing country, instead of the previous colonial methods of direct military control or indirect political control (hegemony). Neocolonialism differs from standard globalisation and development aid in that it typically results in a relationship of dependence, subservience, or financial obligation towards the neocolonialist nation.

Coined by the French philosopher Jean-Paul Sartre in 1956, it was first used by Kwame Nkrumah in the context of African countries undergoing decolonisation in the 1960s. Neocolonialism is discussed in Sartre's works such as Colonialism and Neocolonialism and Noam Chomsky's The Washington Connection and Third World Fascism.

== See also ==
- Settler colonialism
- Analysis of Western European colonialism and colonization
- Western imperialism in Asia
- Historiography of the British Empire
- Neocolonialism
- American imperialism
- Soviet empire
- Zionism as settler colonialism

== Bibliography ==
- Benjamin, Thomas, ed. Encyclopedia of Western Colonialism Since 1450 (3 vol 2006)
- Boxer, C. R. The Dutch Seaborne Empire: 1600–1800 (1966)
- Boxer, Charles R. The Portuguese Seaborne Empire, 1415–1825 (1969)
- Brendon, Piers. "A Moral Audit of the British Empire", History Today (October 2007), Vol. 57, Issue 10, pp. 44–47, online at EBSCO
- Brendon, Piers. The Decline and Fall of the British Empire, 1781–1997 (2008), wide-ranging survey
- Ferro, Marc, Colonization: A Global History (1997)
- Gibbons, H. A. The New Map of Africa (1900–1916): A History of European Colonial Expansion and Colonial Diplomacy (1916) online free
- Hopkins, Anthony G., and Peter J. Cain. British Imperialism: 1688–2015 (Routledge, 2016).
- Mackenzie, John, ed. The Encyclopedia of Empire (4 vol 2016)
- Maltby, William. The Rise and Fall of the Spanish Empire (2008).
- Merriman, Roger Bigelow. The rise of the Spanish Empire in the Old World and in the New (3 vol 1918) online free
- Ness, Immanuel and Zak Cope, eds. The Palgrave Encyclopedia of Imperialism and Anti-Imperialism (2 vol, 2015), 1456pp
- Osterhammel, Jürgen: Colonialism: A Theoretical Overview, (M. Wiener, 1997).
- Page, Melvin E. et al. eds. Colonialism: An International Social, Cultural, and Political Encyclopedia (3 vol 2003)
- Panikkar, K. M. Asia and Western dominance, 1498–1945 (1953)
- Porter, Andrew N. European Imperialism, 1860–1914 (Macmillan International Higher Education, 2016).
- Priestley, Herbert Ingram. France overseas: a study of modern imperialism (Routledge, 2018).
- Stern, Jacques. The French Colonies (1944) online, comprehensive history
- Thomas, Hugh. Rivers of Gold: The Rise of the Spanish Empire (2010)
- Townsend, Mary Evelyn. European colonial expansion since 1871 (1941).

=== Primary sources ===
- Melvin E. Page, ed. Colonialism: An International Social, Cultural, and Political Encyclopedia (2003) vol 3 pp 833–1209 contains major documents.
- Bonnie G. Smith, ed. Imperialism: A History in Documents (2000) for middle and high schools
