= Muharish ibn al-Mujalli =

Muhyi Ad-Deen
- Abu Al-Harith Muharish

Emir of The Ãl Al-Mujalli Emirate
- Reign: Before 1058–1105
- Predecessor: (Emirs of The Uqaylid Dynasty)
- Successor: Sulayman bin Muharish
- Born: Around 1028
- Died: September–November 1105; Haditha, Iraq
- Issue: Sulayman bin Muharish
Names
- Muharish bin Al-Mujalli bin 'Ukaith
- Tribe: Banu Uqayl
- Dynasty: al-Mujallid Emirate
- Religion: Islam
- Occupation: Muhtasib, Emir, Military leader, Wali, Tribal Chief

Abu Al-Harith Muharish ibn Al-Mujalli (Note: Arabic: أبُو الحارِثِ مُهارِشُ بنُ المُجَلِّي, romanized: Abū Al-Hārith Muhārish ibn al-Mujallī) (Note: Muharish's full name and genealogy as cited by the Cairo-based historian Ibn Khallikan (died 1282) and the Mosul-based historian Ibn al-Shaʿār (died 1256) was Abū al-Ḥārith Muhārish ibn al-Mujallī ibn ʿUkayth ibn Qiyān ibn Shuʿayb ibn al-Muqallad al-Akbar ibn Jaʿfar ibn ʿAmr ibn al-Mahya ibn ʿAbdul-Rahman ibn Yuzaid ibn ʿAbd Allāh ibn Zaid ibn Qais ibn Houtha ibn Tahfah ibn Rabīʿa ibn Huzn ibn ʿUbāda ibn ʿUqayl ibn Kaʿb ibn Rabīʿa ibn ʿĀmir ibn Ṣaʿṣaʿ ibn Muʿāwiya ibn Bakr ibn Hawāzin ibn Manṣūr ibn ʿIkrima ibn Khaṣafa ibn Qays ʿAylān.) (Muhyi Ad-Deen (محيي الدين) or Amīr Al-'Arab (أمير العرب): Emir of The Arab Bedouins ior Al-Amīr Al-Taqī (الأمير التقي): The Pious Prince) was the Uqaylid emir of Haditha, Anah. His fiefdoms included Hit, Dujail, and Naarmalcha. He was considered one of the most prominent Bedouin leaders, a military leader, and an emir of the Uqaylid Dynasty and Banu Uqayl.

== Bibliography ==
=== Primary sources ===
- Ibn al-Shaʿār al-Mosili (2005). The Necklaces of Pearls on the Rare Poems of the Poets of This Age. Dar Al-Kotob Al-Ilmiyah. ISBN 2-7451-3796-4.
