= Nasser Al-Ghannam =

Iraqi military commander

Personal details
- Born: Nasser Ahmed al-Ghannam; 1960 (age 65–66) Hit, Iraq

Nasser al-Ghannam (Arabic: ناصر الغنام) is an Iraqi former army general. He was the dean of the Iraqi Military Academy from 2021 until his sacking on 21 May 2025. He was discharged from duty and in December 2025 imprisoned for his role in the deaths of two servicemen during training. He was released in July 2026 following his exoneration by the Federal Court of Cassation.

== Early life ==
Nasser Ahmed al-Ghannam was born in the city of Hit in 1960, to Iraqi Sunni Arab parents. He belongs to the family of the well-known Al-Ghannam branch of Al-Shaya tribe, which is a branch of the larger Banu Uqayl confederation.

== Military service and sacking ==
He graduated from the 1st Iraqi Military Academy. After graduation he completed special forces and underwater training. He worked in special forces regiments and then in the military college. He completed the leadership and the Staff College course and graduated with the rank of Captain.

He became a corner officer in Armored Brigade 41, served as a Republican guard and a Lieutenant in the 3rd Brigade. He served as Special Forces Republican Guard and Assistant Regiment Commander in the 26th Brigade of the Republican Guards and then an Order of the Republican Guards.

He took part in supervising plans to liberate Iraq from Al Qaeda and then became commander of the Army 2nd division in Mosul for two years. He served as commander of the 17th division south of Baghdad for two years.

He completed two degrees, one in military science and another in international business administration.

On 18 October 2014 he started working in the Ministry of Defense and on 7 April 2015 he was assigned to the post of commander of al-Jazira and al-Badiyah Operations (Upper Mesopotamia and Anbar Desert) to liberate Anbar province. In 2020 he was assigned to the post of commander of Basra Operations and in 2021 he became the dean of Iraqi Military Academy.

On 21 May 2025, following an incident in Dhi Qar where two Iraqi Army cadets died in training due to heatstroke, Prime Minister Mohammed Shia Al Sudani ordered Ghannam to be sacked immediately. He was subsequently discharged.

== Imprisonment and release ==
Following his sacking, in December 2025, the Iraqi Military Court sentenced him to two years imprisonment, a ruling which was later upheld by the Military Court of Cassation, for his role in the deaths of two servicemen during training.

On 2 July 2026, the Federal Court of Cassation exonerated al-Ghannam and ordered his immediate release.
