= Muqrin ibn Zamil =

Muqrin ibn Zamil (Arabic: مقرن بن زامل Miqrin ibin Zāmil) was the Jabrid ruler of eastern Arabia, including al-Hasa, al-Qatif, and Bahrain, and the last Jabrid ruler of Bahrain and Eastern Arabia. He was defeated in battle by an invading Portuguese force that conquered the islands of Bahrain in 1521. Having been captured in battle, King Muqrin died from his wounds several days later. The Portuguese commander, António Correia, later depicted King Muqrin's bleeding severed head on his family's coat of arms in Lousã.

Muqrin ascended to power following the death of the Jabrid's most powerful ruler, Ajwad ibn Zamil, who was possibly Muqrin's grandfather. Muqrin was one of three Jabrid brothers who, between them, ruled the Jabrid kingdom composed of Oman, the north coast of Oman, and the Bahrain-Qatif area; Muqrin ruled the latter area from his capital in al-Hasa. He refused to pay tribute to the expanding Portuguese-Hormuzi alliance that had come to dominate the sea lanes, prompting the two allies to send an invasion force to subdue the Jabrid kingdom of Bahrain.

The English 19th-century traveller, James Silk Buckingham's account of the invasion was particularly critical of the "disgraceful" treatment of Muqrin's body:

During the expeditions of the Portuguese in these seas, Lahsa was the seat of a king, to whom the islands of Bahrein and the port of Kateef were subject. An account is given in the Portuguese histories of those times, of an expedition from Ormuz against Bahrein, on account of Mocrim [King Muqrin], the King of Lahsa, having refused to pay tribute to them. Bahrein was taken by the combined arms of the Portuguese and the Hormuzi Persians; and António Correia, the leader of the former, added the title of Bahrein to his name. During the whole engagement, Xarafo, or Asharoff, the Persian admiral, looked on from his vessel as an unconcerned spectator; but when afterwards the body of King Muqrin, who was shot through the thigh and did not die till six days afterwards, was taken over to Lahsa to be interred, this cold blooded and cowardly spectator went over to the town, and cut off his head, which he sent to Ormuz. What seems equally disgraceful is, that Correia, the Portuguese commander, in memory of his share which he had in this event, was authorized to bear King Muqrin’s decapitated [sic] (Note: As "decapitation" means the removal of the head, heads cannot themselves be decapitated; rather, once a body is decapitated, its head is severed.) head in his coat of arms, which is still, says the historian of his own country, born by his descendants in Lousã.

The severed head remains a feature of the coat of arms of the Count of Lousã, Correia's descendant in Portugal.

The defeat of Muqrin began nearly eighty years of Portuguese rule of Bahrain.
