= António Correia (admiral) =

Portuguese explorer (1487–1566)

António Correia Baharem (c. 1487 – 1566) was a Portuguese commander who in 1521 conquered Bahrain, beginning eighty years of Portuguese rule in the Persian Gulf.

Correia was the son of a merchant and explorer Airés Correia, who had gained notoriety during the Portuguese bombardment of Calicut a generation earlier. Like his father, António Correia sought adventure and political intrigue in Portugal's expanding empire in the Indian Ocean.

In the early 15th century, the territory of Bahrain covered both the present day state and Qatif in Eastern Arabia, and was ruled by King Muqrin ibn Zamil, one of three Jabrid brothers who controlled the eastern seaboard of the Gulf. King Muqrin was the nominal vassal of the Portuguese vassals, the Huwala Kingdom of Hormuz, to whom Muqrin paid tribute from the lucrative pearl fisheries that had made Bahrain prosperous. Having subdued the Hormuzis in 1515 and installed friendly leaders in the Kingdom, the Portuguese admiral, Afonso de Albuquerque, identified the Jabrids as the main obstacle to Portuguese control of the Gulf.

In 1521, Muqrin stopped the payments to the Hormuzis prompting the Portuguese to appoint António Correia to head a naval force to subdue Bahrain. With their Hormuzi allies, the Portuguese force landed on 27 June 1521 and fought the Jabrids at a battle near present-day Karbabad. The Bahraini force was beaten and Muqrin captured and, after his death from a wound to the thigh sustained in the battle, beheaded by the Persian admiral of the Hormuzis, who sent the head back to Hormuz. Correia later depicted King Muqrin's severed head on his family's coat of arms. The severed head is still a feature on the coat of arms of the Count of Lousã, Correia's descendants.

The Portuguese immediately started building a huge fort complex at Qalat Al Bahrain in order to control their new possession. The fort still stands as a UNESCO World Heritage Site. But perhaps a more important legacy is that King Muqrin's rule was the last time that “Bahrain” would refer to the historic region of Bahrain rather than to the archipelago of islands that constitutes the present state. António Correia's invasion in effect set the boundaries of the country.
