= Banu Uqayl =

Ancient Arab tribe

Banu Uqayl (Arabic: بنو عُـقَـيـْل) are an ancient Arab tribe that played an important role in the history of Eastern Arabia and Iraq. They belong to the Banu Ka'b branch of the large Banu 'Amir confederation.

The Banu 'Amir confederation of tribes had their original homeland in the western Arabian Peninsula on the border between the Hejaz and the Najd. The 'Uqayl branch moved southwards and settled in the large valley known as "al-'Aqiq" (modern day Wadi al-Dawasir), which they later claimed was granted to them by the prophet of Islam Muhammad. During the Abbasid Caliphate, most of the Banu 'Amir moved from the Najd into Iraq and Syria.

The Uqaylids were among the last to leave, settling on the banks of the Euphrates, where a section founded the Uqaylid dynasty, which controlled Mosul and other regions of Upper Mesopotamia, though remaining largely nomadic. When the Uqaylid dynasty fell, three large Uqaylid tribes, the Khafaja, the Ubadah, and al-Muntafiq, settled in Lower Mesopotamia, and remain there to the present day.

Another section of the Uqayl, possibly coming from Iraq, according to ibn Khaldun, took over the deserts of eastern Arabia, around al-Ahsa Oasis. There they allied themselves with the Qarmatians, like many other Banu Amir groups. The Qarmatians fell to the Uyunid dynasty, a sedentary Arab clan from al-Hasa, in 1076. In the mid-13th centuries, one Uqaylid clan leader, Usfur ibn Rashid, deposed the Uyunids, and founded the Usfurids, which lasted until 1330. The area was then taken over by the Shi'i Jarwanid dynasty based in Qatif.

The most powerful Uqaylid dynasty, however, were the Jabrids. Some historians believe they were a branch of the 'Usfurids or at least closely related to them. Their most famous ruler, Ajwad ibn Zamil, however, is described by his contemporaries as having been "of Najdi origin." Ajwad's elder brother established the dynasty in the early 15th century by deposing and killing the last Jarwanid ruler in Qatif. At their height, the Jabrids controlled the entire Arabian coast on the Persian Gulf, including the islands of Bahrain, and regularly led expeditions into central Arabia. One contemporary scholar described Ajwad ibn Zamil as "the king of al-Ahsa and Qatif and the leader of the people of Najd." The Jabrids lost Bahrain to the Portuguese in 1521 and their kingdom collapsed soon afterwards on the mainland. One branch of the Jabrids remained active in Oman however for nearly another three centuries. It is unknown for sure what became of the Jabrids. Some believe they left to Iraq, while others believe they are identical with the "Jubur" section of the Bani Khalid, who eventually took control of the region after the Jabrids. The Bani Khalid tribe itself is believed to be partly of Uqaylid origin.

== Notable people ==
Among the tribe's members are:

- Ibrahim ibn Asim al-'Uqayli, Umayyad commander and governor of Sistan
- Ishaq ibn Muslim al-Uqayli, Umayyad commander and governor of Arminiya
- Layla al-Akhyaliyya, Umayyad Classical poet
- Muhammad ibn al-Musayyab, chieftain and Founder of Uqaylid Emirate
- Ibn Mulhim, Fatimid commander and governor of Aleppo

== See also ==
- Tribes of Arabia
- Banu 'Amir
