= Ajwad ibn Zamil =

- Malik al-Arab (King of the Arabs)
- Reign: 1463—1496
- Predecessor: Saif bin Zamil bin Saif Al-Aqili
- Born: Ajwad bin Zamil bin Saif Al-Aqili; 1418; Between Al-Ahsa Oasis and Qatif
- Died: 1496
- Issue: Muhammad ibn Ajwad bin Zamil bin Saif
- ar: أجود بن زامل
- Father: Zamil bin Saif Al-Aqili
- Religion: Islam

Ajwad bin Zamil bin Saif Al-Aqili (Arabic: أجود بن زامل بن سيف العقيلي, born in 1418, died in 1496) was ruler of the Jabrids who in the late 15th century united most of the Eastern Arabia under one state

== Genealogy ==
Born Ajwad ibn Zamil al-Aqili al-Jabri, he was known as Ibn Jabr after his grandfather. He was also said to be nicknamed “Mahrez.”

== Life ==
He was born in the Al-Ahsa-Qatif deserts in 1418. His brother Saif was the last governor for the Jarwanid dynasty. By 1487, Ibn Jabr had conquered the lands of the Nabhani dynasty, after having already achieved suzerainty over the Kingdom of Ormus. In 1475, Salghur Shah of Ormus had quarreled with his brother over the throne and paid tribute to Ibn Jabr in exchange for help in the civil war. Known for his chivalry and courage throughout the region, he was commemorated in a proverb on the Peninsula stating “There is nobody finer than the finest” (Ajwad is Arabic for “finest”). His emirate was based just west of where the village of Al Munaizilah stands today. More than 30,000 accompanied him on his Hajj. He died in 1496 and was succeeded by his son Muhammad.

== Bibliography ==
- Khoury, Ibrahim; Al-Tadmouri, Ahmed. سلطنة هرمز العربية (“The Sultanate of Ormus”), vol. 2. Ras Al Khaimah: American University of Ras Al Khaimah Press, 1999.
- Saadoun, Khaled. مختصر التاريخ السياسي للخليج العربي منذ أقدم حضاراته حتى سنة 1971 (“A Brief Political History of the Arabian Gulf from Its Earliest Civilizations to 1971”). Beirut: Dar Jadawel, 2012.
- Al-Sakhawi. Al-Daw' al-lami` li ahli al-Qarni al-Tasi.
- Shaker, Mahmoud. التاريخ الإسلامي، العهد المملوكي (“Islamic History: The Mamluk Era”). Beirut: al-Maktab al-Islami, 2000.
