= Usfurids =

Dynasty

Usfurids dynasty الدولة العصفورية
- 1253–1392
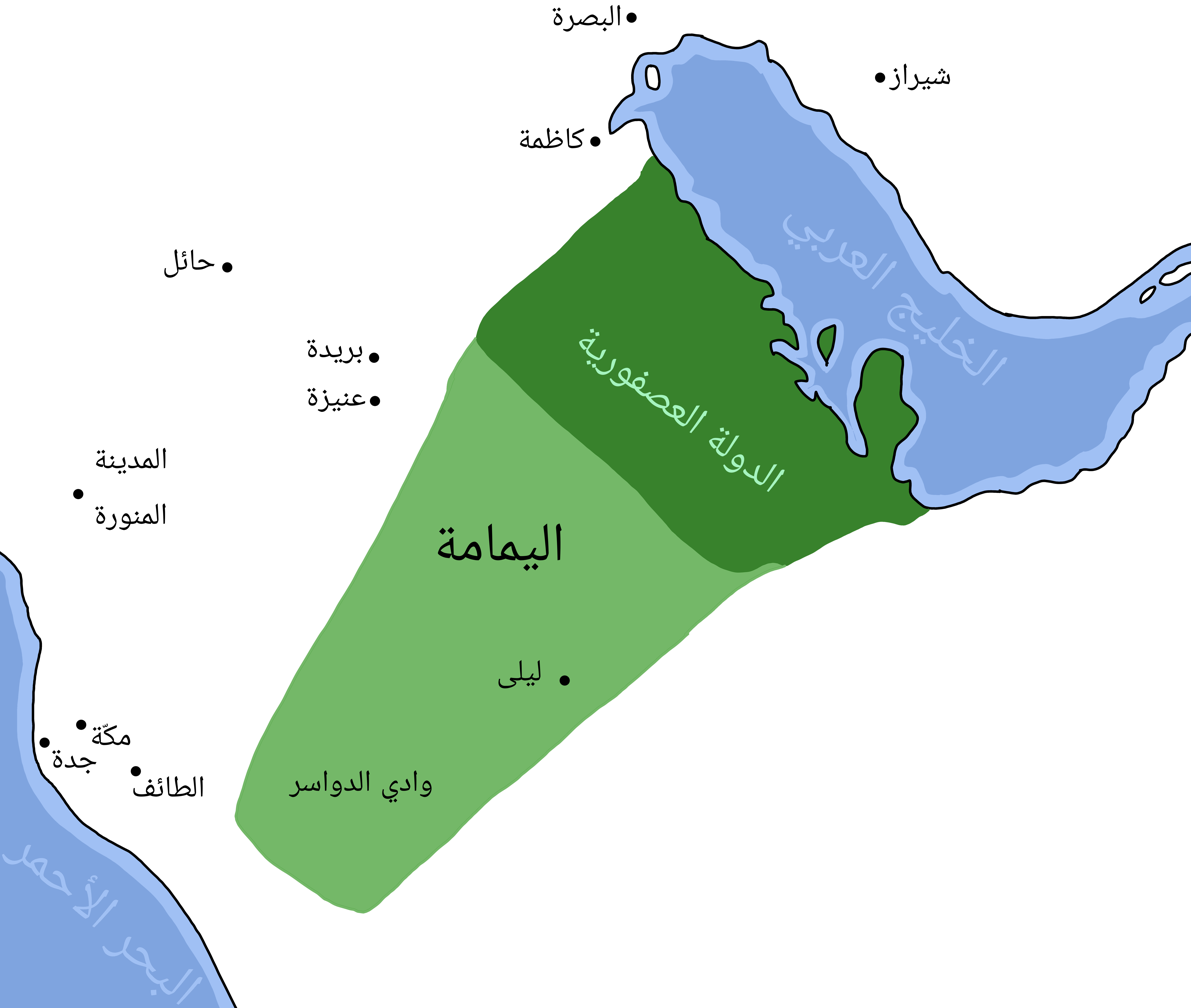
- The borders of the Usfurid emirate
- Capital: al-Ahsa
- Common languages: Arabic
- Religion: Shia Islam
- Government: Emirate
- Historical era: 13th-14th centuries
  - Established: 1253
  - Disestablished: 1392
Preceded by	Succeeded by
Uyunid Emirate	Jarwanid dynasty
- Today part of: Saudi Arabia; Bahrain; Kuwait; Qatar; United Arab Emirates

The Usfurids (Arabic: آل عصفور, romanized: Al ʿUṣfūr) were an Arab dynasty that in 1253 gained control of Eastern Arabia, including the islands of Bahrain. They were a branch of Uqaylids who re-migrated to Arabia after the fall of their rule in Syria.

== Name ==
The dynasty is named after its founder, ʿUṣfūr bin Rāshid (عُصْفُور بِن رَاشِد). The name ʿUṣfūr (عصفور) means small bird.

== History ==
The Usfurids were initially allies of the Qarmatians and their successors, the Uyunids, but eventually overthrew the latter and seized power themselves. The Usfurids' takeover came after Uyunid power had been weakened by invasion in 1235 by the Salghurid Atabeg of Fars.

At the beginning of their rule the Usfurids had a state composed of central and eastern Arabia and even ruled parts of Oman. After 150 years of rule the Usfurids were overthrown by the Jarwanids whom in turn were overthrown by the Jabrids who were also an Uqaylid dynasty.

According to Arab sources, in 1354 the Arabian forces from the Usfurids invaded Basra and defeated the Mongols where they inflicted heavy losses on them. However, Sheikh Hassan al-Jalairi the Great, who succeeded the Mongols in ruling Iraq and was himself a Mongol sought help from Prince Fawaz bin Muhanna, the leader of the Ta’is Tribe who defeated the Usfurids and expelled them from Basra.

== See also ==
- History of Bahrain: 10th-16th centuries
- Jarwanid dynasty
- Kalbids
- Mirdasids
- Uqaylid Dynasty
- Uyunid dynasty
- Yusuf al-Bahrani, descendant of the Usfurid dynasty
