= Afghan (tribal chief) =

Afghana
- Born: Jerusalem
- Died: Zhob, Sulaiman Mountains, Balochistan
- House: House of Saul
- Father: Irmia (Jeremiah)
- Religion: Abrahamism

Afghan is a tribal chief or prince of Pashtuns, who is traditionally considered the progenitor of modern-day Pashtuns, the largest ethnic group in Afghanistan and second largest in Pakistan. The ethnonym "Afghan" is believed to derive from his name.

One of the earliest mention of the word Afghan is by Shapur I of the Sassanid Empire during the 3rd century CE, in documents found in Northern Afghanistan.

== House of King Saul ==
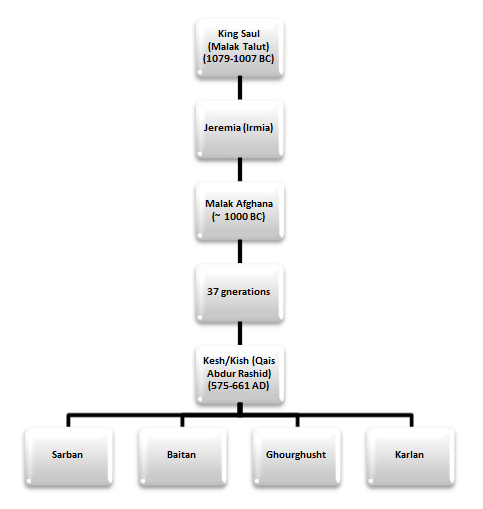
Genealogy and family tree of Malak Afghana, grandson of King Saul

According to the Tanakh, King Saul (Talut) was the son of Kish, a member of the tribe of Benjamin, one of the twelve Tribes of Israel (1 Samuel 9:1–2). Saul married Ahinoam, daughter of Ahimaaz and had four sons and two daughters. The sons were Jonathan, Abinadab, Malchishua, Ish-bosheth, Ishvi, Armani, Irmia, and Mephibosheth. Saul's daughters were named Merab and Michal.

According to Tadhkirat al-Muluk, Malak Afghana migrated to the place known as Takht-i-Sulaiman and generations later Qais Abdur Rashid, a descendant of Malak Afghana, embraced Islam.

== Death ==
According to legend, after his death he was buried in what is now Zhob Sulaiman Mountains in Balochistan.

In other folklore however, Qais Abdur Rashid in his old age, when he felt his time was near, asked his sons to bury him in the vicinity of Zhob (Sulaiman Mountains) at the location where his ancestor Afghana was buried.

== See also ==
- Nimat Allah al-Harawi author of Tarikh-i-Khan Jahani Makhzan-i-Afghani also known as The History of the Afghans
- Ten Lost Tribes
