= Jarwanid dynasty =

Dynasty that ruled the Province of Bahrain

Jarwanid dynasty الجروانيون
- 1310–1417
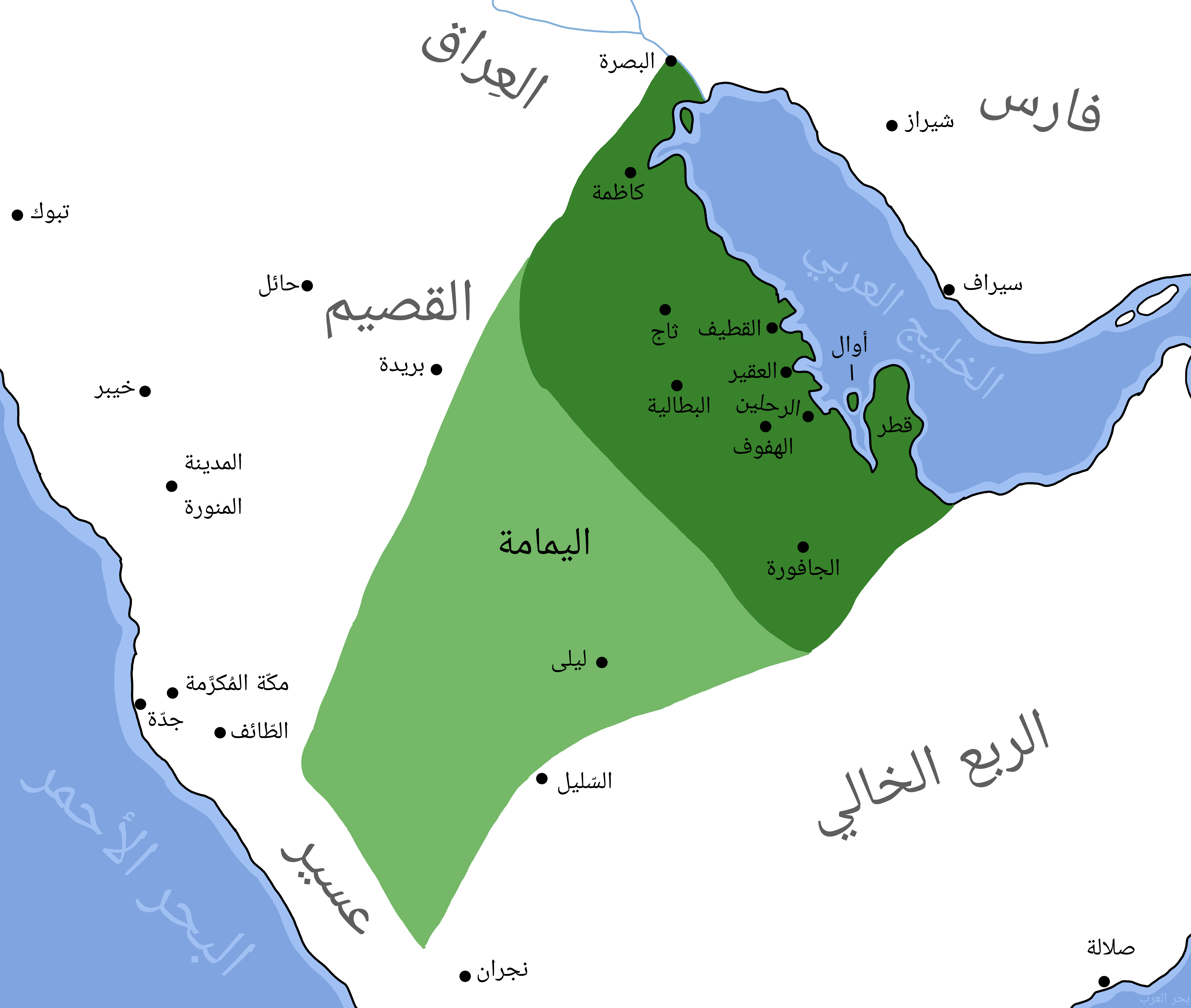
- Area of Jarwanid influence and domains.
- Capital: Qatif
- Common languages: Arabic
- Religion: Twelver Shia Islam
- Government: Monarchy
- History
  - Established: 1310
  - Disestablished: 1417
Preceded by	Succeeded by
Usfurids	Jabrids
- Today part of: Saudi Arabia; Bahrain; Qatar

The Jarwanid dynasty (Arabic: الجروانيون) was an Arab dynasty that ruled Eastern Arabia in the 14th century.

== History ==
The Jarwanids belonged to the clan of Bani Malik. It is disputed whether they belonged to the Banu Uqayl—the tribe of their predecessors the Usfurids and their successors the Jabrids—or to the Banu Abdul Qays, to whom the Uyunid dynasty (1076-1235) belonged. The Jarwanids came to power some time in the 14th century, after expelling the forces of Sa'eed ibn Mughamis, the chief of the Muntafiq tribe based in the Iraqi city of Basrah.

Contemporary sources such Ibn Battuta and Ibn Hajar describe the Jarwanids as being "extreme Rawafidh," a term for Shi'ites who rejected the first three Caliphs, while a 15th-century Sunni scholar from Egypt describes them as being "remnants of the Qarmatians." Historian Juan Cole concludes from this that they were Isma'ilis. However, the Twelver Shi'ite sect was promoted under their rule, and Twelver scholars held the judgeships and other important positions, including the chief of the hisba. Also, unlike under the Qarmatians, Islamic prayers were held in the mosques under Jarwanid rule, and prayer was called under the Shi'ite formula. A Twelver scholar of the 14th century, Jamaluddeen Al-Mutawwa', belonged to the house of Jarwan. According to Al-Humaydan, who specialized in the history of eastern Arabia, the Jarwanids were Twelvers, and the term "Qaramita" was used simply as an epithet for "Shi'ite."

Jarwanid rule came to an end in the 15th century at the hands of the Jabrids, a clan of the Banu Uqayl Bedouins.

== See also ==
- List of Shia dynasties
- Uyunid dynasty
- Uqaylid dynasty
- Mirdasids
- Kalbids
- Banu Amir
