= Jabrids =

Dynasty

Jabrids Emirate الإمارة الجبرية
- 1417–1524
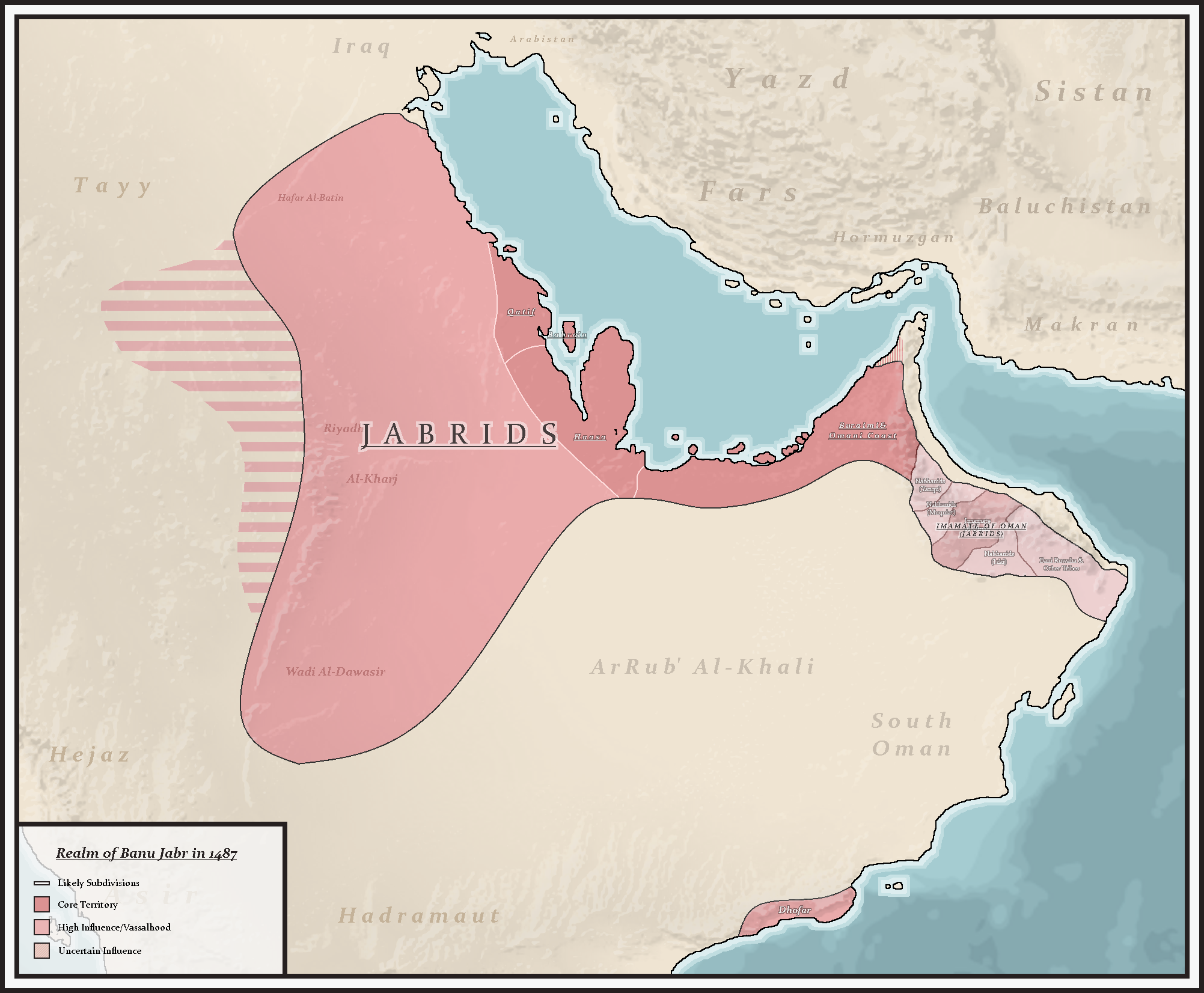
- The Jabrid sultanate under the reign of Ajwad bin Zamil
- Common languages: Arabic
- Religion: Islam, Sunni Maliki
- Government: Emirate
  - 1417–1463: Zamil bin Hussein bin Jabr (first)
  - 1500s–1524: Ghossib bin Hilal (last)
- Historical era: 15th-16th centuries
  - Established: 1417
  - Disestablished: 1524
Preceded by
Jarwanid Dynasty
Succeeded by
Portuguese Empire
Al-Muntafiq
Lahsa Eyalet
Bani Khalid Emirate

The Jabrids (Arabic: الجبريون, romanized: al-Jabrīyūn) or Banu Jabr were an Arab dynasty that ruled all of Arabia except for Hejaz, parts of Oman and Yemen, and expanded into Iran's southern coast, controlling the Strait of Hormuz.

== History ==
Their most prominent ruler was Ajwad ibn Zamil, who died in 1496. He was described by his contemporaries as having been "of tribe of Banu Uqayl origin." Ajwad's elder brother had earlier established the dynasty in the early 15th century by deposing and killing the last Jarwanid ruler in Qatif. At their height, the Jabrids controlled the entire Arabian coast on the Persian Gulf, including the islands of Bahrain, and regularly led expeditions into central Arabia and Oman.

The Jabrids had a major role in reviving the Ibadhi Imamate in opposition to the Nabhanids, They appointed Omar Bin Khattab Al Kharusi in as an Imam in 1487, in exchange for him paying an annual tribute to the Jabrid treasury and Imam Muhammad bin Ismail in 1500. However, Jabrid rule was limited in Oman as the interior was contested by the Jabrids in one part, the Imamate in another and the Nabhanids in another part, whilst most of the Omani coast overlooking the Gulf of Oman remained under the rule of Hormuz. Jabrid rule remained in effect in some regions till the arrival of the

One contemporary scholar described Ajwad ibn Zamil as "the king of al-Ahsa and Qatif and the leader of the people of Najd." Following his death, his kingdom was divided among some of his descendants, with Migrin ibn Zamil (possibly his grandson) inheriting al-Hasa, Qatif, and Bahrain. Migrin fell in battle in Bahrain in a failed attempt to repel an invasion of Bahrain by the Portuguese in 1521.

== Culture and literature ==
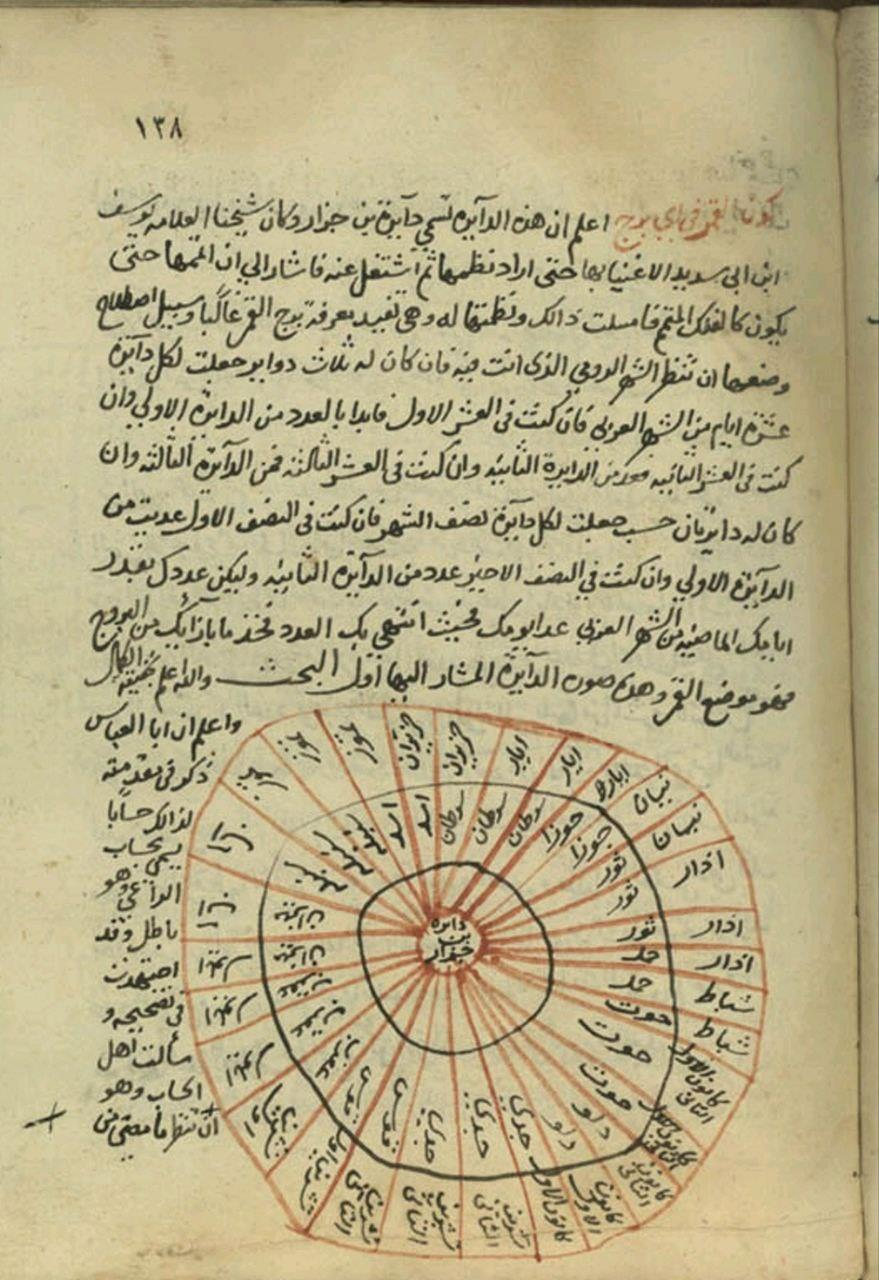
Jabrid-era work on astronomy by mathematician Ali Ibn Mājid.

The Jabrid state was widely recognized by historians for its strong support of Maliki law and traditional Islamic science. Sultan Ajwad ibn Zamil founded many schools across Eastern Arabia and Oman. The Jabrids were also the first patrons of Nabati poetry written in Najdi Arabic

== See also ==
- List of Sunni dynasties
