= Amerasian =

East/Southeast Asia-born person with a native mother and an American servicemember father

An Amerasian may refer to a person born in East or Southeast Asia to an East Asian or Southeast Asian mother and a U.S. military father. Other terms used include War babies or G.I. Babies.

Several countries in East and Southeast Asia have significant populations of Amerasians, reflecting a history of U.S. military presence within those two respective regions. These include Okinawa (Japan), South Korea, Cambodia, China, Laos, Thailand, Vietnam, Taiwan, and the Philippines. The latter once had the largest U.S. air and naval bases outside the U.S. mainland.

== Definitions ==
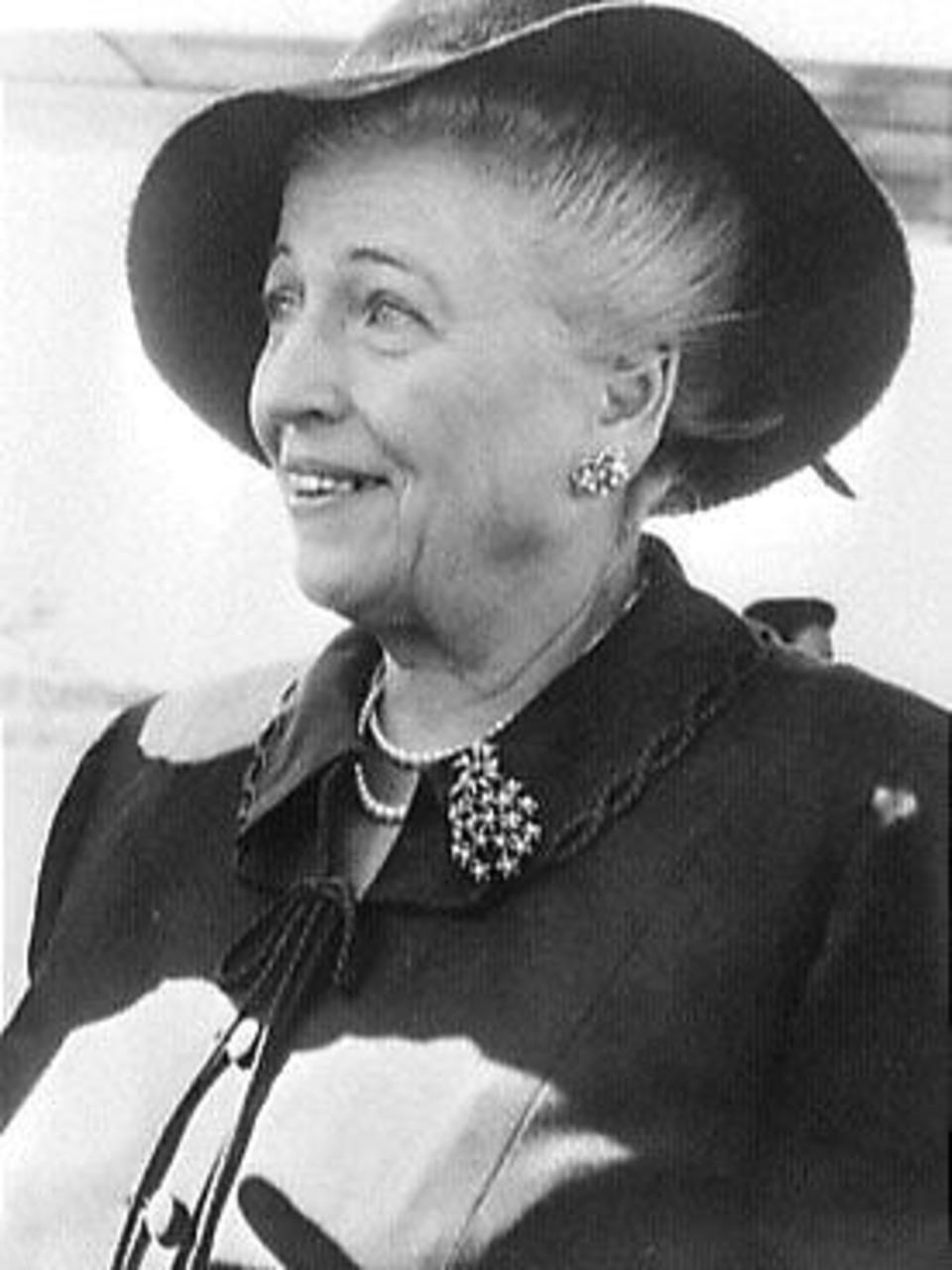
Novelist Pearl S. Buck is credited for dubbing the term Amerasian.

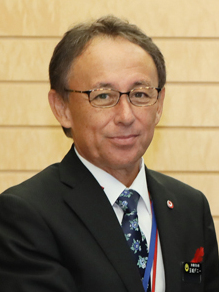
Denny Tamaki, a politician of mixed Japanese and European American heritage, is the former Governor of Okinawa Prefecture.

The term was coined by novelist Pearl S. Buck and was formalized by the Immigration and Naturalization Service. Many people were born to East or Southeast Asian women and U.S. servicemen during World War II, the Korean War and the Vietnam War. The official definition of Amerasian came about as a result of Public Law 97-359, enacted by the 97th Congress of the United States on October 22, 1982.

According to the United States Department of Justice and the Immigration and Naturalization Service (INS), an Amerasian is: "[A]n alien who was born in Korea, Kampuchea, Laos, Thailand or Vietnam after December 31, 1950 and before October 22, 1982 and was fathered by a U.S. citizen." The Amerasian Foundation (AF) and Amerasian Family Finder (AFF) define an Amerasian as "Any person who was fathered by a citizen of the United States (an American serviceman, American expatriate or U.S. Government Employee (Regular or Contract)) and whose mother is or was, an Asian National."

The term is commonly applied to half Japanese children fathered by a U.S. serviceman based in Japan, as well as half Korean children fathered by veterans of the Korean War or stationary soldiers in South Korea. The term is also applied to children of Filipinos and American rulers during the U.S. colonial period of the Philippines (still used until today) and children of Thais and U.S. soldiers during World War II and the Vietnam War. The U.S. had bases in Thailand during the Vietnam War.

Amerasian should not be interpreted as a fixed racial term relating to a specific category of multiracial groups (such as Mestizo, Mulatto, Eurasian or Afro-Asians). The racial strain of the American parent of one Amerasian may be different from that of another Amerasian; it may be White, Black, Hispanic or even Asians in general. (Note: The term "Asian" used according to contemporary American parlance and for U.S. government census purposes describes Asian people § United States as a race. Furthermore, the term "Asian" in the United States is often synonymous with people of East Asian ancestry. Ethno-racial groups from other parts of Continental Asia or of Continental Asian origin are not considered "Asian" in American terms.) In the latter case, it is conceivable that the Amerasian could be fathered by a person who shares the same racial stock, but not necessarily the same nationality.

In certain cases, the term could also apply to the progency of American females, who engaged in professions such as military nursing for East and Southeast Asian males. Mixed-race children, whatever the occupational background or prestige of their parents, have suffered social stigma. With genetic relation to U.S. soldiers, Amerasians have faced additional exclusion by perceived association to being military enemies of East and Southeast Asian countries. This stigma extended to the mothers of Amerasians, the majority of whom were Asian, causing many of the Asian mothers to abandon their Amerasian children. The abandonment of both parents led to a large proportion of orphaned Amerasians.

== Cambodia ==
The Amerasian Immigration Act included Amerasians whose fathers were U.S. citizens and whose mothers were nationals of Kampuchea (Cambodia). As many as 10,000 Cambodians of mixed Amerasian ancestry may have been fathered by U.S. servicemen.

== Japan ==
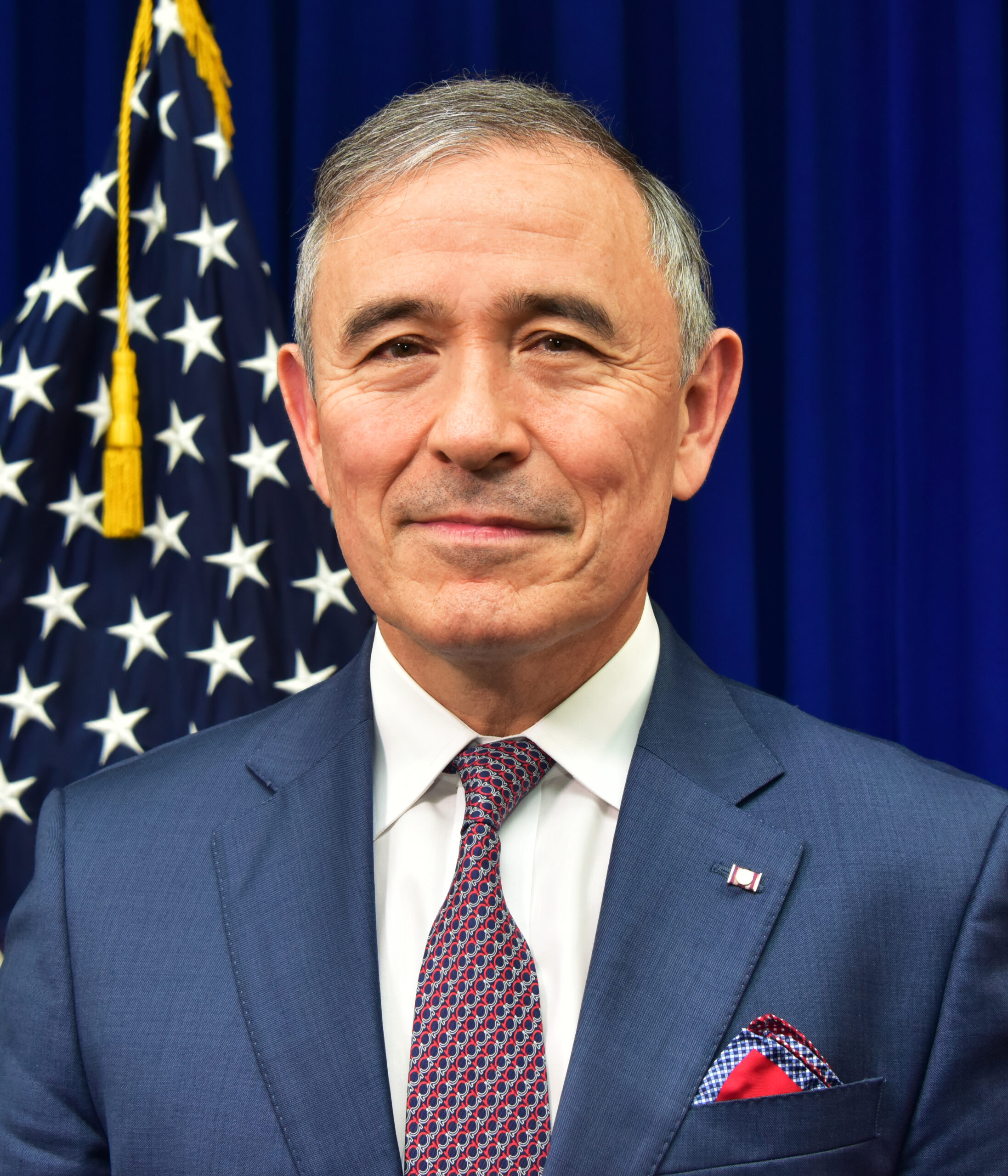
Harry B. Harris Jr., who is of mixed Japanese and European ancestry, is an Amerasian who served as the 23rd United States Ambassador to South Korea.

According to one estimate, around 5,000 to 10,000 Amerasian babies had been born in Japan from 1945 to 1952. Data from the Japanese Welfare Ministry from July 1952, on the other hand, revealed that only 5,013 Japanese Amerasian children were born in all of Japan. Masami Takada from the Welfare Ministry put an exaggerated estimate of 150,000 – 200,000. Another investigation by the Welfare Ministry was conducted again in August 1953, this time them revising the number to reveal that only 3,490 half-castes of American fathers and Japanese mothers had been born during the 7 years of American occupation of Japan, which lasted from 1945 – 1952. Some of the children were abandoned and raised in orphanages such as the Elizabeth Saunders Home in Oiso, Japan.

The actual number of Japanese Amerasians is unknown. Officially, the number of 10,000 Amerasians in Japan would be an upper limit. Some contemporary writers had however reported rumors of 200,000 while actual numbers had been found to be 5,000, possibly 10,000, no more than 20,000 allowing for underestimates. Of those fathered by American soldiers. Their presumed "colors" were 86.1% "white," 11.5% "black" and 2.5% "unknown."

=== Hāfu ===
Today, many Japanese Amerasians go by the term Hāfu, which is used to refer to a person who is half Japanese and half non-Japanese ancestry.

=== Amerasian School of Okinawa ===
In Okinawa, The Amerasian School of Okinawa was formed to educate children of two different cultures. The school population includes Japanese Amerasians.

== Laos ==
The Amerasian Immigration Act included Amerasians whose fathers were U.S. citizens and whose mothers were nationals of Laos. The number of Laotian Amerasians is currently unknown.

== Philippines ==
=== The Forgotten Amerasians ===
Since 1898, when the United States annexed the Philippines from Spain, there were as many as 21 U.S. bases and 100,000 U.S. military personnel stationed there. The bases closed in 1992 leaving behind thousands of Amerasian children. There are an estimated 52,000 Amerasians in the Philippines. According to an academic research paper presented in the U.S. (in 2012) by a Philippines Amerasian college research study unit, the number could be a lot more, possibly reaching 250,000, this is due the fact almost all generations of Amerasians intermarried with other Amerasians and Filipino natives. The newer Amerasians from the United States would add to the already older settlement of peoples from other countries in the Americas that happened when the Philippines was under Spanish rule. The Philippines once received immigrants from Spanish-colonized Panama, Peru, and Mexico; which are all countries in the Americas.

Unlike their counterparts in other countries, American-Asians or Amerasians in the Philippines remain impoverished and neglected. A study by the University of the Philippines' Center for Women Studies found that many Amerasians have experienced some form of abuse and/or domestic violence. The findings cited cases of racial, gender and class discrimination that Amerasian children and youth suffer from strangers, peers, classmates and teachers. The study also said black Amerasians seem to suffer more from racial and class discrimination than their white-descended counterparts.

Two-thirds of Amerasian children are raised by single mothers, others by relatives and non-relatives. 6% live on their own or in institutions, and 90% were born out of wedlock. It was reported in 1993 that prostitutes are increasingly Amerasian (especially black amerasian females), and frequently children of prostitutes who are caught in a cycle that transcends generations.

=== Legal action ===
In 1982, the U.S. passed the Amerasian Immigration Act, giving preferential immigration status to Amerasian children born during the Vietnam Conflict. The act did not apply to Amerasians born in the Philippines. They can become United States citizens only if claimed by their fathers; most fathers fail to do so. To become citizens of the United States, Filipino Amerasians must be able to show proof of parentage by a U.S. citizen before they turn eighteen years old; most are unable to do so before that cut off age.

A class-action suit was filed in 1993 on their behalf in the International Court of Complaints in Washington, DC, to establish Filipino American children's rights to assistance. The court denied the claim, ruling that the children were born to unmarried women who provided sexual services to U.S. service personnel in the Philippines and who were therefore engaged in illicit acts of prostitution. Such illegal activity could not be the basis for any legal claim.

In 2012, the number of Amerasians descended from American servicemen in the Philippines or “G.I. babies” was estimated to be around 250,000.

== South Korea ==
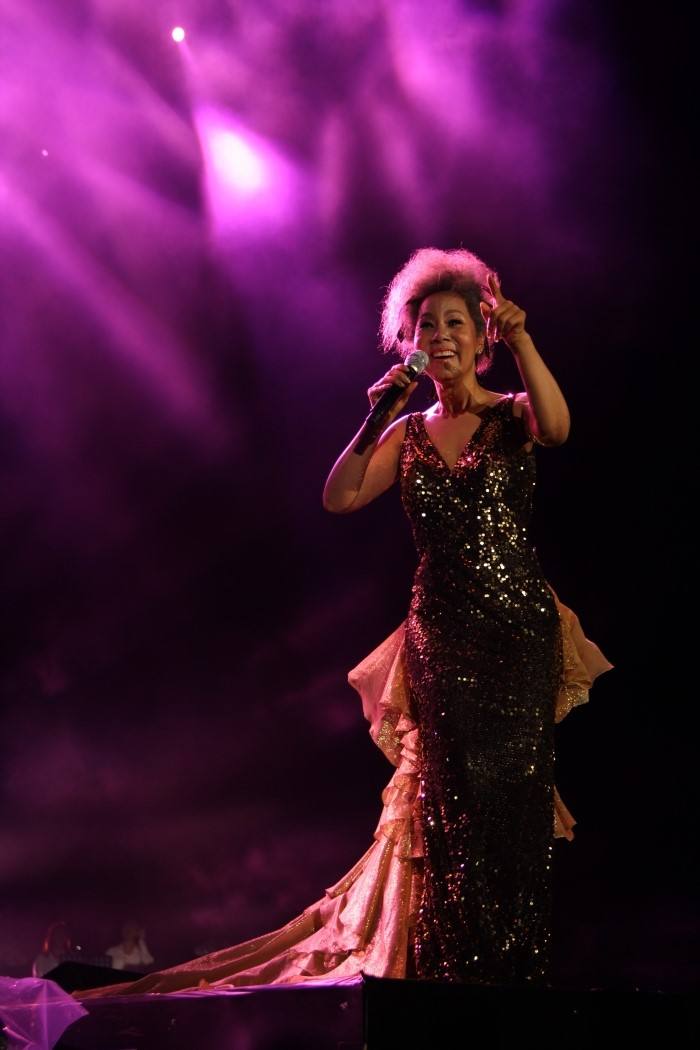
Insooni is a singer who is of mixed African-American and Korean parentage.

Since the Korean War, there has been a significant population of Amerasians in South Korea. Many Amerasians were born into "Camptowns" which were established by the South Korean government. The women in these Camptowns were affected by the post-war poverty and turned to prostitution with American soldiers. This perpetuated the stereotype that children born in Camptowns were mothered by prostitutes. The South Korean government never viewed Korean Amerasians as Korean citizens but encouraged the foreign adoption of mixed South Korean babies. In 1953 the United States Congress passed the Refugee Relief Act, which allowed 4000 Amerasians to emigrate to the US for adoption. This group became commonly known as Korean Adoptees. They were part of the International adoption of South Korean children that made up roughly 160,000 adoptees.

=== Amerasian Christian Academy ===
The Amerasian Christian Academy still educates Amerasian children today in Gyeonggi-Do, South Korea.

== Taiwan ==
U.S. soldiers fathered children in Taiwan at the end of World War II. Today there are an estimated 1,000 Taiwanese Amerasians. Over 200,000 American soldiers in Korea and Vietnam visited Taiwan for rest and relaxation between 1950 and 1975.

== Thailand ==
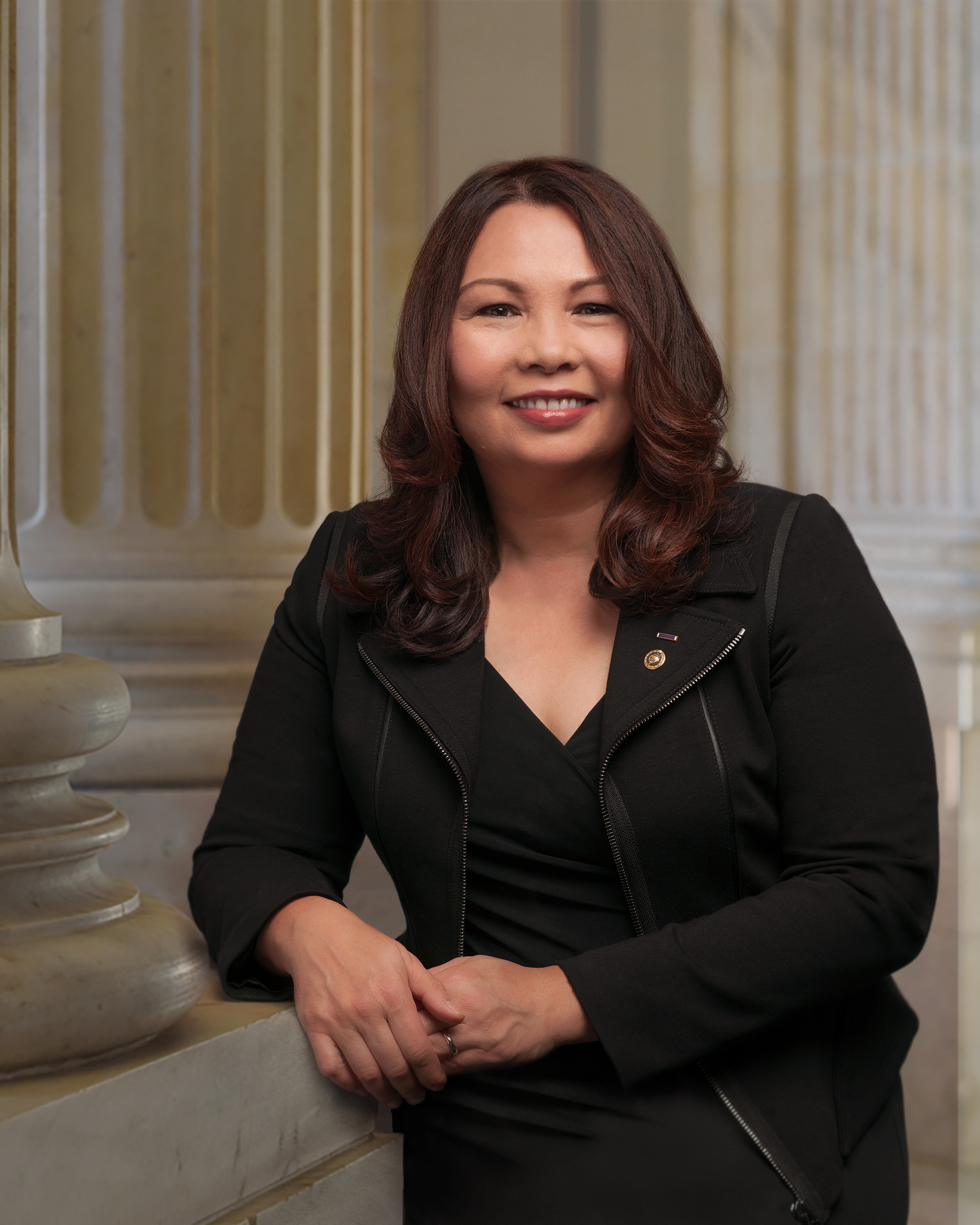
Tammy Duckworth, a Thai Amerasian, is the United States Senator from Illinois.

In Thailand, Amerasian children are dubbed as Luk khrueng or half children in the Thai language. These Amerasians were fathered by U.S. soldiers who took part in the Vietnam War. At the height of the Vietnam War, 50,000 GIs were based in Thailand. The Pearl S. Buck Foundation estimated around 5,000-8,000 Thai Amerasians. Some migrated to the United States under the 1982 Amerasian Immigration Act. An unknown number were left behind. "I had trouble at school. I was teased and bullied a lot because of my skin color," says entertainer Morris Kple Roberts, who had an African American father and a Thai mother.

=== Searches ===
U.S. veteran Gene Ponce, helps American fathers find their Thai Amerasian children. He has recently used popular DNA services, such as Ancestry.com to help match Amerasians with their U.S. relatives.

== Vietnam ==
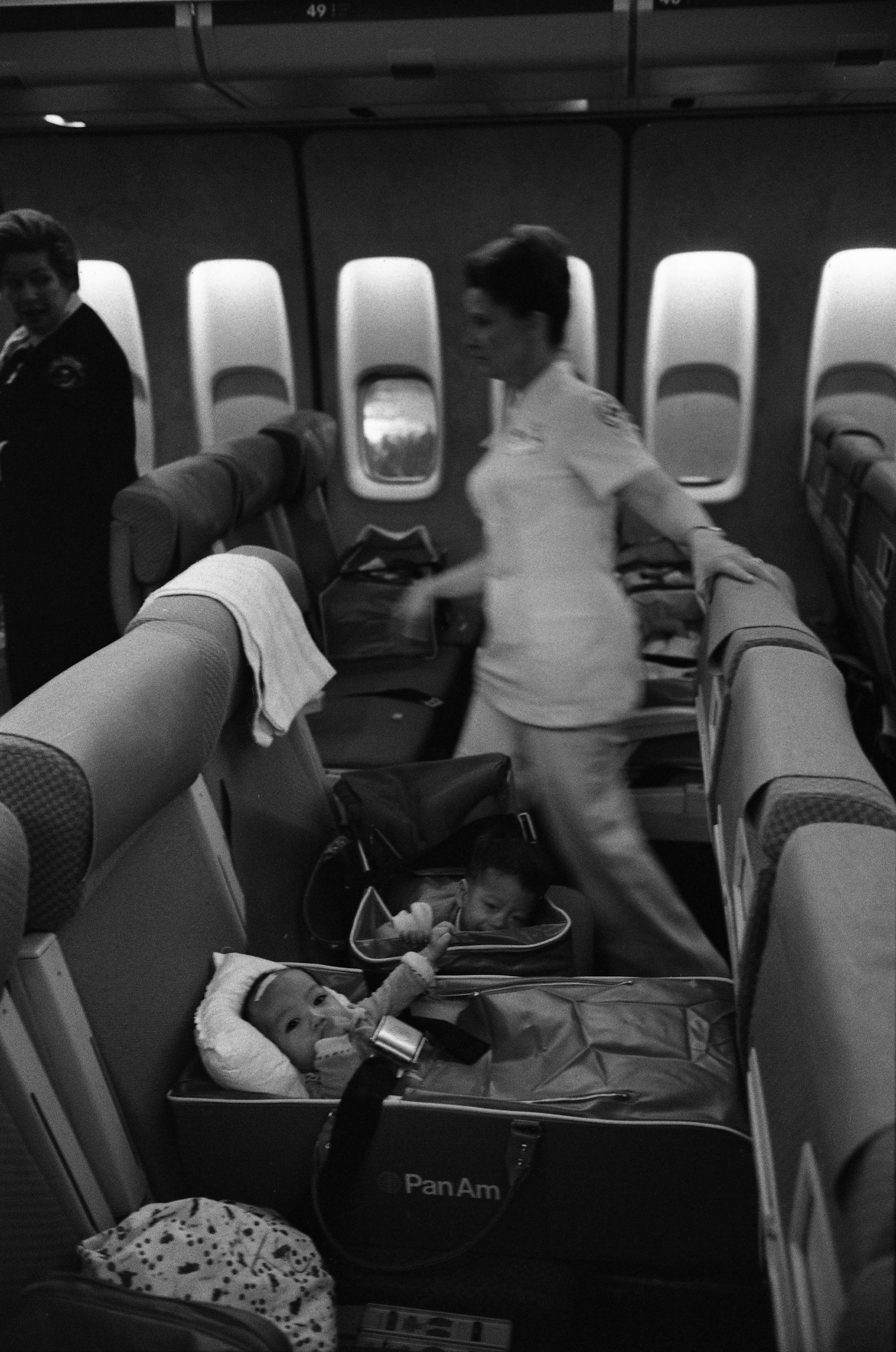
An Operation Babylift flight arrives at San Francisco, 5 April 1975.

The exact number of Amerasians in Vietnam is not known. The U.S. soldiers stationed in Vietnam had relationships with local women, many of whom had origins in nightclubs, brothels and pubs. The American Embassy once reported there were fewer than 1,000 Amerasians. A report by the South Vietnamese Senate Subcommittee suggested there are 15,000 to 20,000 children of mixed European American and Vietnamese ancestry, but this figure was considered low. Congress estimated 20,000 to 30,000 Amerasians by 1975 lived in Vietnam. According to Amerasians Without Borders, they estimated about 25,000 to 30,000 Vietnamese Amerasians were born from American first participation in Vietnam in 1962 and lasted until 1975. Although during the Operation Babylift it was estimated at 23,000. In April 1975, Operation Babylift was initiated in South Vietnam to relocate Vietnamese children, many orphans and those of mixed American-Vietnamese parentage (mostly Vietnamese mothers and American serviceman fathers), to the United States and find American families who would take them in. The crash of the first flight of Operation Babylift led to the death of 138 people, 78 of which were children. During the operation, they estimated over 3,000 Amerasians were evacuated from South Vietnam; however, more than 20,000 Amerasians remained.

In July 1979, the United Nations High Commissioner for Refugees (UNHCR) created the Orderly Departure Program in order to mitigate safer travel conditions for Vietnamese refugees to various nations after the Vietnam War. However, since its inception to mid 1982, only 23 Amerasians successfully emigrated under the Orderly Departure Program. By October 1982, there was more hope for Amerasian emigration as the largest group of 11 Amerasian children, aged seven to fifteen, departed from Vietnam to immigrate to the U.S.

In 1982, the U.S. Congress passed the Amerasian Immigration Act in an attempt to grant Amerasian immigration to the U.S. However, the Amerasian Immigration Act provided great emigration difficulty for many Vietnamese Amerasians, due to a lack of diplomatic relations between the U.S. and the Vietnamese government. This was due to a clause in the Amerasian Immigration Act that required documentation of the fathers in the U.S. in order for the Vietnamese Amerasians to acquire a visa. However, around 500 Amerasians were still able to safely immigrate to the U.S. between 1982 and 1983 due to Hanoi's cooperating with the U.S. In 1988, U.S. Congress passed the American Homecoming Act, aiming to grant citizenship to Vietnamese Amerasians born between 1962 and 1975. By 1994, more than 75,000 Amerasians and their family from Vietnam immigrated to the U.S. The American Homecoming act eventually led to 23,000 Amerasians and 67,000 of their relatives immigrating to the U.S. For the Vietnamese Amerasians, this meant that their migration to the U.S. occurred as teenagers, leading to struggles in the resettlement process. A study in 1994 found that 22% of Amerasian men and 18% of Amerasian women residing in the U.S. reported physical or sexual abuse. By 2018, at least 400 Amerasians still currently reside Vietnam through DNA testing of 500 people by the nonprofit organization Amerasians Without Borders.

=== Vietnamese Amerasian Search Organizations ===
Up to the 2000s, many Vietnamese Amerasians were still not reunited with their fathers. Some Amerasians still resided in Vietnam unable to obtain the necessary documents to emigrate to the United States. Organizations such as the Amerasian Child Find Network, run by Clint Haines and AAHope Foundation, run by Jonathan Tinquist, helped American fathers reunite with their Amerasian children. Both are Vietnam Vets.

Other organizations that helped with Amerasian, Adoptee and family searches included the Adopted Vietnamese International (AVI) (Indigo Willing) and Operation Reunite (Trista Goldberg). The only current active U.S. organization seeking to reunite Amerasians is Amerasian Without Borders (AWB) run by Jimmy Miller, a U.S. based Vietnamese Amerasian.

=== Notable Vietnamese Amerasians ===
- Johnathon Franklin Freeman was a film producer, actor and production manager born in Saigon, Vietnam to a Vietnamese mother and an American serviceman. His mother sent Johnathan and his sister to an orphanage where they were eventually sent to the U.S. as part of Operation Babylift. He was married to Kim Fields from 1995 to 2001. In February 2007, the Amerasian Family Finder cooperating with the Amerasian Foundation found his mother in Saigon who he reunited in May 2007. He died on August 21, 2020.
- Phi Nhung - Phạm Phi Nhung was born on 10 April 1970 in Pleiku, Vietnam to a Vietnamese mother and an American serviceman father. She was a singer who specialized in Dan Ca and Tru Tinh music. On 26 August 2021 she was hospitalized to Cho Ray Hospital after contracting COVID-19. About a month later, her health took a turn for the worse. Phi Nhung died on 28 September 2021 due to COVID-19 complications.
- Thanh Hà - Trương Minh Hà was born in Đà Nẵng, Vietnam to a Vietnamese mother and an American serviceman father of German origin. She is a Vietnamese American singer known under the stage name as Thanh Hà.

== International Amerasian Day ==
March 4 has been designated as Amerasian Day in the Philippines. The Amerasian Foundation has designated it as International Amerasian Day.

== In popular culture ==
- The 1957 film Sayonara features a Japanese woman who falls in love with a white serviceman and they talk about having mixed children together.
- In the anime and manga franchise Great Mazinger ("Guretto Majinga" in Japanese), the character of Jun Honoo is the daughter of a Japanese woman and a U.S. African American serviceman. As such, she had to endure stigma and racism during her youth due to her status as "hafu" and her darker skin compared to Amerasians born from white parents.
- In the 1972 TV series M*A*S*H, episode 15 of season 8, "Yessir, That's Our Baby", Hawkeye and BJ attempt to send an Amerasian baby to the United States, facing difficulty at every step of the way. With no other viable solution, they act on Father Mulcahy's advice and take the baby to a monastery in the dead of night to provide her with safety and care.
- "Straight to Hell", a song by rock music group the Clash, considers the plight of Vietnam War Amerasians.
- The 1977 movie Green Eyes starred Paul Winfield as a Vietnam War veteran who returns to Vietnam in search of the son he fathered with a Vietnamese woman.
- The Chuck Norris film Braddock: Missing in Action III (1988) depicted Amerasian children trapped in Vietnam; Norris plays the father of an Amerasian child who believes that his Vietnamese wife died during the Fall of Saigon.
- In the 1984 TV series Highway to Heaven, episode 11 of season 1, titled "Dust Child," the two lead characters Jonathan, played by Michael Landon and Mark, played by Victor French, help an Amerasian girl facing racial prejudice when she goes to live with her father's family in the United States.
- In the 1988 TV series In the Heat of the Night, episode 9 of season 3, titled "My Name is Hank," an Amerasian teenager named Hank believes that he was fathered by a deceased police officer once employed by the Sparta, Mississippi police department.
- The Oscar-nominated 1995 film Dust of Life tells the story of Son, a boy with a Vietnamese mother and African American father, who is interned in a Re-education camp.
- In the 1997 animated television sitcom King of the Hill, Hank discovers that he has an Amerasian brother living in Japan.
- In the 1999 American Vietnamese language film Three Seasons, James Hager, played by Harvey Keitel, searches for his Vietnamese Amerasian daughter in hopes of "coming to peace with this place".
- The 2001 novel The Unwanted by Kien Nguyen is a memoir about the author's experience growing up as an Amerasian in Vietnam until he emigrates to the United States at age eighteen.
- Daughter from Đà Nẵng is a 2002 award-winning documentary film about an Amerasian woman who returns to visit her biological family in Đà Nẵng, Vietnam after 22 years of separation and living in the United States.
- The musical Miss Saigon focuses on a young Vietnamese woman who falls in love with an American GI and later has his child after the Fall of Saigon.
- The 2004 film The Beautiful Country is about an Amerasian boy (played by Damien Nguyen) who leaves his native Vietnam to find his father.
- In 2007 at TED, Photographer Rick Smolan's The Story of a Girl tells the unforgettable story of a young Amerasian girl, a fateful photograph and an adoption saga with a twist.
- The 2010 documentary Left by the Ship which aired on PBS Independent Lens in May 2012, follows the lives of four modern Filipino Amerasians for two years, showing the struggle to overcome the stigma related to their birth.
- The 2014 movie Noble, tells the true life story of Christina Noble, who overcomes the harsh difficulties of her childhood in Ireland to find her calling by helping the Bụi Dời (Vietnamese Amerasians) on the streets of Ho Chi Minh City.
- In 2018, Dateline NBC aired Father's Day, where a Vietnamese Amerasian woman takes a DNA test hoping to learn more about her family tree.

== See also ==
- Bui doi
- Hāfu
- Hapa
- Lai Đại Hàn
- Luk khrueng
- Multiracial
- Occupation of Japan
- Prostitutes in South Korea for the U.S. military
- R&R (military)
