= Vietnamese Americans =

Americans of Vietnamese birth or descent

Vietnamese Americans Người Mỹ gốc Việt Người Việt kiều Mỹ
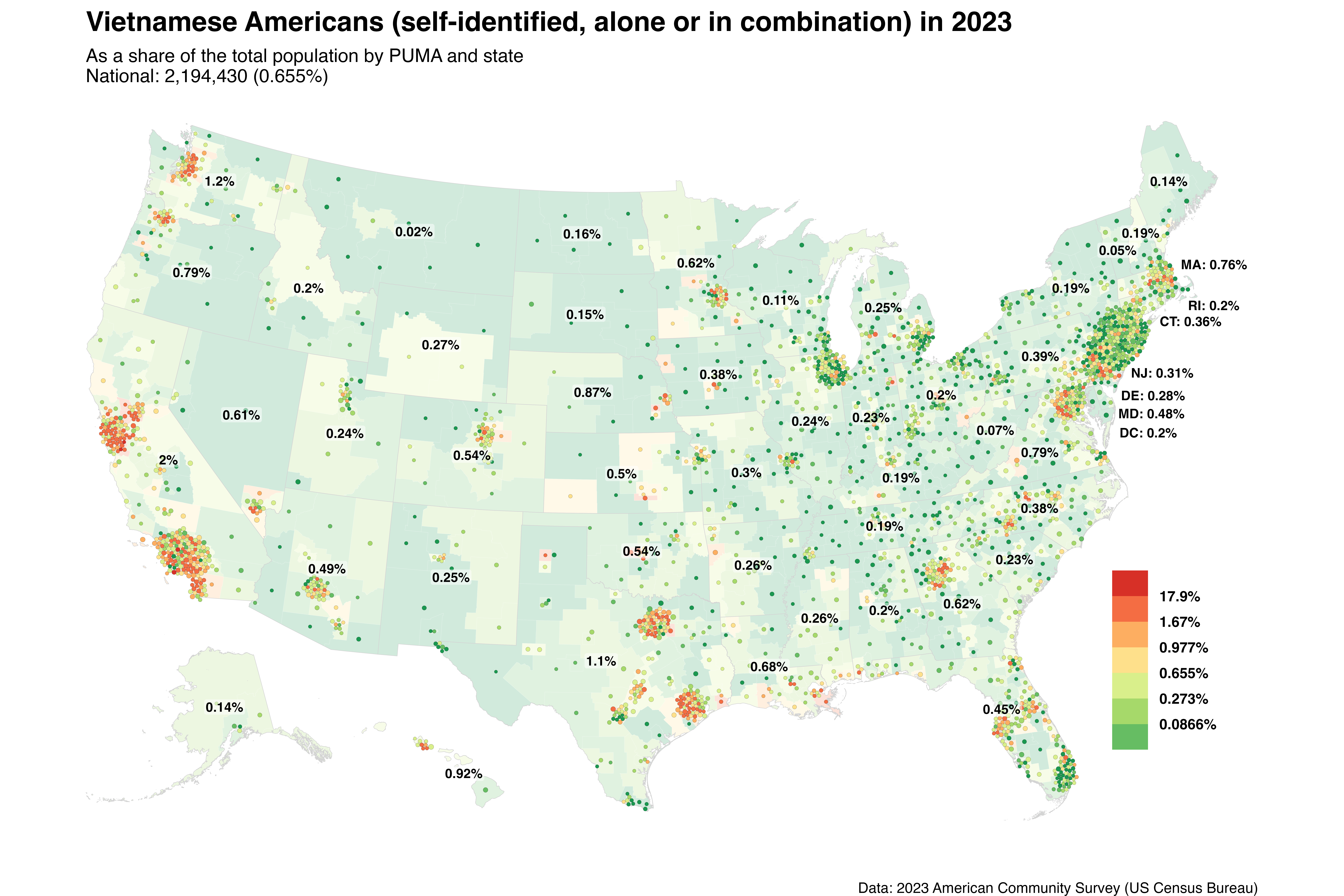

Total population
- 2,347,344 (2023) (ancestry or ethnic origin); 1,365,841 (2023) (born in Vietnam)

Regions with significant populations
- Los Angeles and Orange County; San Francisco Bay Area (esp. San Jose); Sacramento, California; Greater Houston; Dallas-Fort Worth; Oklahoma City; Portland, Oregon; Twin Cities metropolitan area; Washington metropolitan area/Northern Virginia/Maryland; Seattle area; San Diego County; Metro Atlanta; North Carolina (Greensboro, Raleigh, Charlotte); Greater New Orleans; Greater Boston; Philadelphia area; Denver; Honolulu; Greater Orlando; Irvington, Alabama; others

Languages
- Vietnamese, American English, languages of the United States

Religion
- Buddhism (37%) • Christianity (36%); Unaffiliated (23%) • Vietnamese folk religion • Caodaism • Hòa Hảo

Related ethnic groups
- Vietnamese Canadians, Vietnamese Australians, Vietnamese New Zealanders, Vietnamese diaspora
- Includes Catholic (29%), Evangelical (4%), and other Protestant denominations (3%)

Vietnamese Americans (Vietnamese: người Mỹ gốc Việt) are Americans of Vietnamese ancestry. They constitute the largest part of the Vietnamese diaspora. As of 2023, over 2.3 million people of Vietnamese descent live in the United States, making them the fourth largest Asian American ethnic group. The majority (about 60%) are immigrants, while 40% were born in the United States.

The Vietnamese American population grew significantly after 1975, when a large wave of South Vietnamese refugees arrived in the U.S. following the end of the Vietnam War. Rooted in the experience of communist violence and oppression, the Vietnamese American community is marked by a prevalent anticommunist and oftentimes conservative identity. Today, over half of Vietnamese Americans reside in California and Texas, particularly in metropolitan areas like Los Angeles, Houston, and San Jose.

== History ==
=== Early arrivals (pre-1975) ===
The history of Vietnamese Americans is relatively recent. Early arrivals included both laborers and elites. Among them was Ho Chi Minh, who later became a Vietnamese communist leader. He arrived in 1912 as a ship’s cook, although parts of his American experience may have been embellished.

According to the U.S. Department of Homeland Security's Office of Immigration Statistics, the earliest recorded instances of Vietnamese individuals obtaining lawful permanent resident (LPR) status in the United States occurred between 1951 and 1959, when 290 Vietnamese were granted residency. These numbers began to grow during the Vietnam War, with around 2,949 Vietnamese obtaining LPR status between 1960 and 1969. Between 1955 and 1974, about 18,000 immigrants from Vietnam were admitted to the U.S.

=== First wave of immigration: 1975 and the Fall of Saigon ===
The Fall of Saigon on April 30, 1975, which marked the end of the Vietnam War, triggered the first major wave of Vietnamese immigration, as many with ties to the United States or the South Vietnam government feared reprisals from the communist regime.

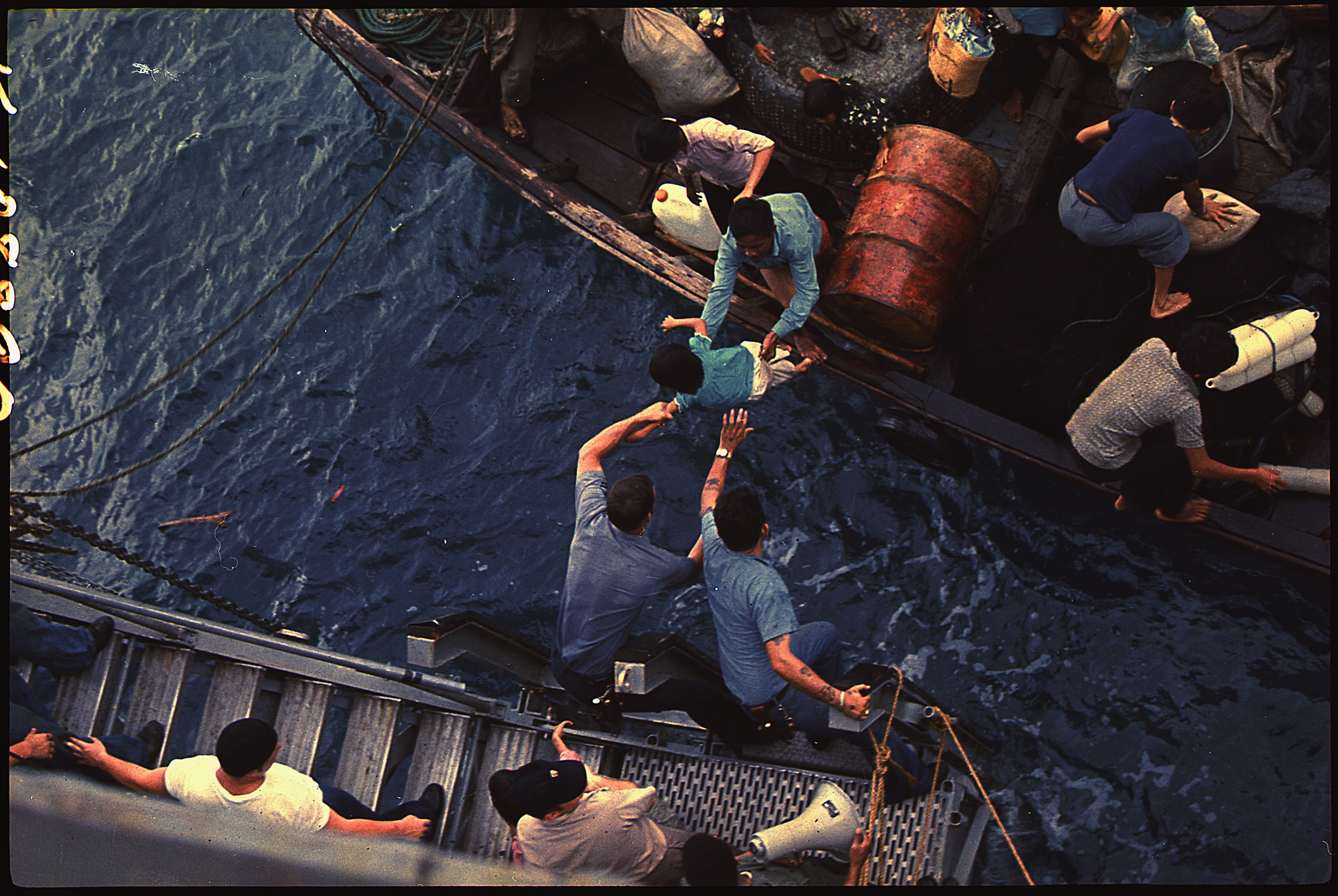
Crewmen of the USS Durham (LKA-114) take Vietnamese refugees from a small craft in 1975.

In the week leading up to the Fall of Saigon, between 10,000 and 15,000 people departed on scheduled flights, followed by an additional 80,000 who were evacuated by air. The final group was transported aboard U.S. Navy ships. Altogether, approximately 125,000 to 130,000 Vietnamese refugees were evacuated and resettled in the United States during the first wave.

After leaving Vietnam, the refugees first arrived at reception camps in the Philippines and Guam before being transferred to temporary housing at U.S. military bases, including Camp Pendleton (California), Fort Chaffee (Arkansas), Eglin Air Force Base (Florida), and Fort Indiantown Gap (Pennsylvania). Following resettlement preparations, they were assigned to voluntary agencies (VOLAGs), which provided assistance in securing financial and personal support from sponsors in the U.S.

Most first-wave refugees were better educated, wealthier, and more proficient in English than those in subsequent waves. According to 1975 U.S. State Department data, over 30% of first-wave household heads were medical professionals or technical managers, 16.9% worked in transportation, and 11.7% held clerical or sales jobs in Vietnam. Less than 5% were fishermen or farmers.

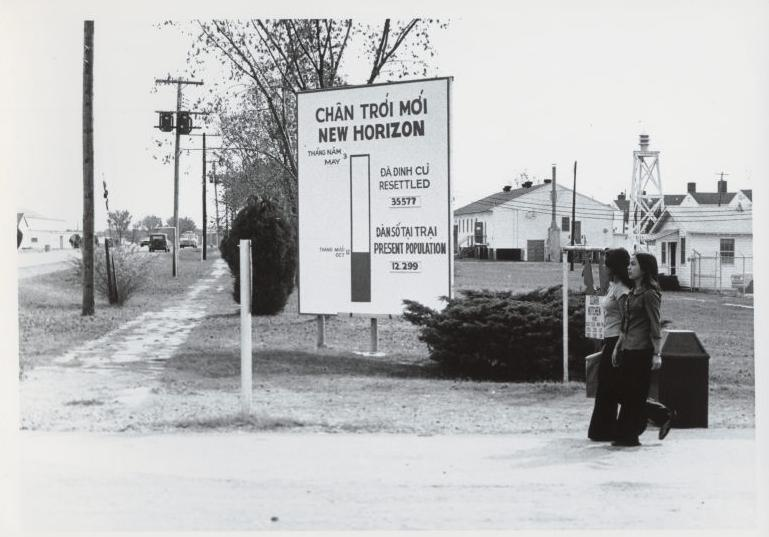
Vietnamese refugees at Fort Chaffee, Arkansas, during the late 1970s

The resettlement of South Vietnamese refugees in the U.S. initially faced mixed reception, fueled by fears of job competition, welfare strain, and cultural concerns. According to a 1975 Gallup poll, only 36% of Americans approved of the resettlement, while 54% disapproved.

Despite initial public reluctance, President Gerald Ford emphasized a "profound moral obligation" to assist the refugees, calling it a "great human tragedy." In response, Congress passed the Indochina Migration and Refugee Assistance Act of 1975, providing special entry status and $455 million in resettlement aid.

To prevent the refugees from forming ethnic enclaves and minimize impact on local communities, they were initially dispersed across the country. However, within a few years, many relocated to California and Texas.

=== Second wave of immigration: "boat people" (1978–1980s) ===
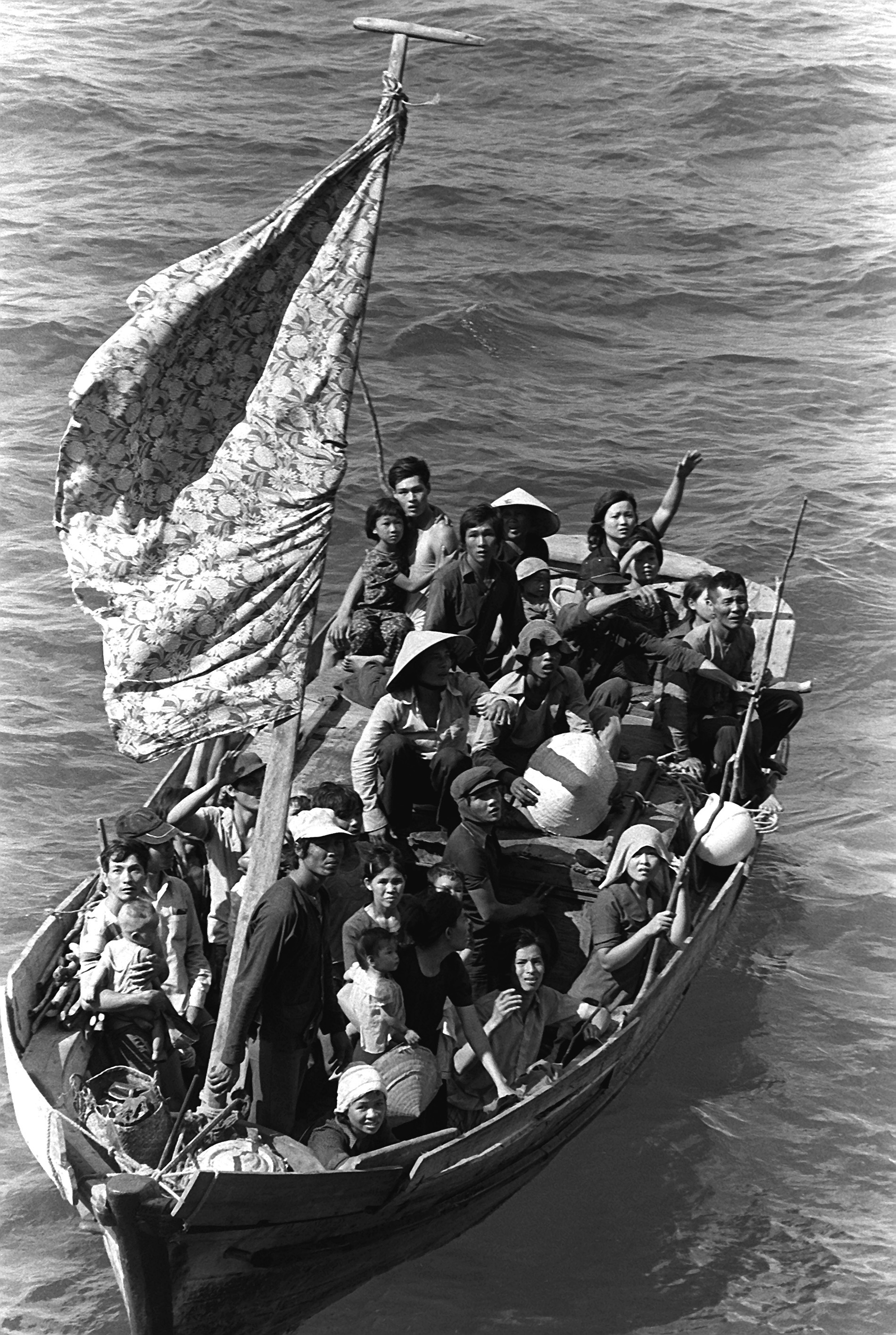
Vietnamese boat people awaiting rescue.

Between 1978 to the mid-1980s, a second major wave of refugees from former South Vietnam fled, primarily by sea on fishing boats, becoming known as "boat people." This group represented a diverse range of backgrounds, including South Vietnamese elites, former South Vietnam military and government officials, Chinese minorities, religious minorities, farmers, fishermen, and merchants.

Many fled persecution following the fall of Saigon, where many South Vietnamese, particularly former South Vietnamese military officers and government employees, were detained in re-education camps for political indoctrination, forced labor, and torture. A significant number of boat people included ethnic Chinese, Hmong, and other minority groups, many of whom were Vietnamese citizens. Notably, ethnic Chinese were specifically targeted for expulsion and accounted for 50% to 80% of the over 50,000 monthly refugee arrivals at Southeast Asian camps in 1979.

The boat people were often rescued up by foreign ships and transported to asylum camps in Hong Kong and Southeast Asia such as Thailand, Malaysia, Singapore, Indonesia, and the Philippines. From these camps, many were resettled in countries that agreed to accept them, including the United States, Canada, Australia, France, and others.

Between 1975 and 1979, limitations in existing refugee admission laws required U.S. presidential actions to admit approximately 300,000 Southeast Asian refugees, including many from Vietnam. In response to the plight of Vietnamese boat people, Congress passed the Refugee Act of 1980 to ease restrictions on refugee admissions.

In 1979, the United Nations High Commissioner for Refugees (UNHCR) established the Orderly Departure Program (ODP) to facilitate legal emigration from Vietnam to the U.S. and other countries. The ODP initially succeeded in relocating an average of 16,500 individuals annually—over 115,000 people by 1986, including 50,000 to the United States. However, progress eventually stalled due to disagreements over priorities, as the U.S. focused on specific groups such as Amerasian children and re-education camp prisoners, while Vietnam prioritized the exodus of ethnic Chinese.

==== Vietnamese Fishermen's Association Antitrust Suit ====
Vietnamese refugees in the Gulf Coast faced discrimination as they arrived throughout the 1970s and 1980s. White fishermen complained about unfair competition from their Vietnamese American counterparts. "Non-Vietnamese docks refused to allow Vietnamese American boats to dock, [and] wholesalers refused to buy shrimp from Vietnamese Americans." The Ku Klux Klan attempted to intimidate Vietnamese American shrimp fishermen, at one time having plans to burn Vietnamese shrimp boats. The Vietnamese Fishermen's Association, with the aid of the Southern Poverty Law Center, won a 1981 antitrust suit against the Klan, disbanding the "private army of white supremacists."

=== Shifts in Vietnamese immigration pathways (post-1980s) ===
While Vietnamese immigration has remained relatively steady since the 1980s, the pathways for Vietnamese immigrants to obtain lawful permanent resident (LPR) status have changed dramatically.

Prior to 1998, the majority of Vietnamese green card holders were granted LPR status on humanitarian grounds, such as through refugee or asylum programs. In 1982, for example, 99% of Vietnamese immigrants received green cards via these channels.

By 2022, this figure had fallen to less than 1%, or fewer than 100 Vietnamese. Instead, the majority of Vietnamese immigrants (87%) gained green cards through family reunification, a rate much higher than the overall figure of 58%. About 12% secured LPR status via employment sponsorship.

== Demographics ==
Historical population
Year	Pop.	±%
1980	261,729	—
1990	614,517	+134.8%
2000	1,122,528	+82.7%
2010	1,548,449	+37.9%
2023	2,347,344	+51.6%

=== Population and distribution ===
As of 2023, nearly 2.4 million Vietnamese Americans lived in the United States, according to the U.S. Census Bureau, with approximately 60% being immigrants ("foreign-born") and 40% born in the U.S. The number includes the majority Viet people as well as other ethnic groups such as the Montagnard, Muong, Thái, Cham, and Hoa Chinese.

Vietnamese Americans have the highest naturalization rate among all immigrant groups. By 2023, 78% of eligible Vietnamese immigrants in the United States had become U.S. citizens, surpassing the 53% naturalization rate of the overall foreign-born population. In fiscal year 2024, Vietnam ranked among the top five countries of origin for new U.S. citizens, accounting for 4.1% of all naturalizations.

Geographically, Vietnamese Americans are predominantly concentrated in California (38%), Texas (14%), and Washington State (5%). Florida, Virginia, Georgia, and Massachusetts each accounted for about 3% to 4% of the Vietnamese American population. Major hubs include Orange, Santa Clara, and Los Angeles counties in California, and Harris County in Texas, together making up 31% of Vietnamese immigrants in the U.S.

The largest and oldest Vietnamese-American enclave in the United States, Little Saigon, is located in Westminster and Garden Grove. According to the 2023 United States Census American Community Survey (ACS), Vietnamese Americans account for 43.8% and 32.6% of the population, respectively.

Vietnamese Immigrants (Foreign-born) by County (2023)
Rank	County	State	Population
1	Orange County	California	152,500
2	Santa Clara County	California	99,000
3	Los Angeles County	California	97,100
4	Harris County	Texas	75,400
5	San Diego County	California	34,500
6	King County	Washington	34,000
7	Sacramento County	California	27,500
8	Alameda County	California	27,000
9	Dallas County	Texas	23,400
10	Fairfax County	Virginia	23,200

=== Socioeconomics ===
==== Education ====
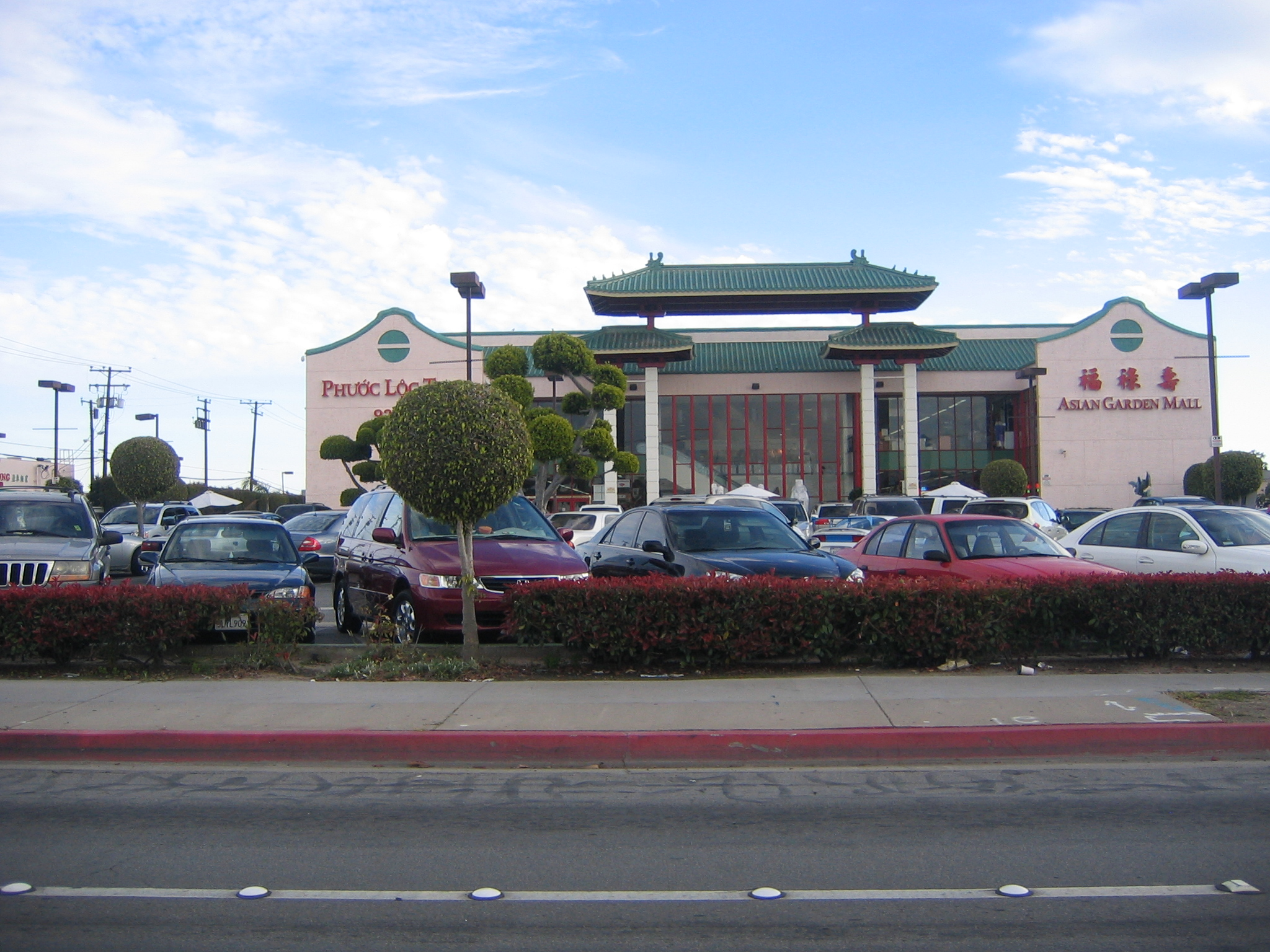
Phước Lộc Thọ (Asian Garden Mall), the first Vietnamese American business center in Little Saigon, California

Coming from different waves of immigration, Vietnamese Americans have a lower educational attainment than overall Asian American population but it is higher than other Southeast Asian groups and is also trending upward, with each generation more likely to attain higher degrees and/or qualifications overall than the generation prior.

As of 2019, 32% of Vietnamese Americans held a bachelor's degree or higher, compared to 54% of Asian Americans overall and 33% of the total U.S. population. Educational attainment varies notably between U.S.-born and foreign-born Vietnamese Americans. Among those born in the U.S., 55% have earned a bachelor's degree or higher, while 27% of those born abroad have achieved the same level of education.

==== Income ====
In 2023, Vietnamese Americans had a median household income of $88,467, which was 9.7% higher than the national median of $80,610.

As of 2022, around 11% Vietnamese Americans lived below the poverty line, a rate similar to the 11.5% rate for the general U.S. population. This poverty rate has shown a gradual decline over recent years. In 2015, about 14.3% of Vietnamese Americans were living in poverty, which decreased to 12% by 2019.

==== Employment ====
Employment distribution of Vietnamese Americans
1. Management, business, science, and arts (36.0%)
2. Services (30.0%)
3. Sales and office (13.0%)
4. Natural resources, construction, and maintenance (4.00%)
5. Production, transportation, and material moving (17.0%)

In 2023, the employment rate for Vietnamese Americans was 61.4%, surpassing the overall U.S. employment rate of 60.3% during the same period. The unemployment rate was 2.8%, notably lower than the national average of 3.6%. Vietnamese Americans work in a wide array of occupations, with employment distributed as follows:

- Management, business, science, and arts: 36%
- Services: 30%
- Sales and office: 13%
- Natural resources, construction, and maintenance: 4%
- Production, transportation, and material moving: 17%

== Culture ==
=== Language ===
Spread of the Vietnamese language in the United States

According to the U.S. Census Bureau’s 2019 American Community Survey, approximately 1.5 million people aged five and older speak Vietnamese at home, making it the fifth most commonly spoken language in the U.S., after English, Spanish, Chinese, and Tagalog.

Additionally, the survey indicates that 57% of Vietnamese speakers reported speaking English "less than very well." This percentage is higher than that of Spanish (39%) and Tagalog (30%) speakers, and comparable to Chinese speakers (52%).

English proficiency varies significantly between U.S.-born and foreign-born Vietnamese Americans. While 90% of U.S.-born Vietnamese Americans are fluent in English, only 35% of the foreign-born counterparts report the same level of proficiency.

=== Religion ===
Religious affiliation of Vietnamese American adults (2023)
1. Buddhist (37.0%)
2. Christian (36.0%)
3. Religiously unaffiliated (23.0%)
4. Other (4.00%)

According to the Pew Research Center, 37% of Vietnamese Americans identify as Buddhist, 36% as Christian, and 23% have no religious affiliation, while smaller proportions adhere to other faiths (2%), identify as Muslim (<1%), or did not provide an answer (3%).

In 2024, Vietnamese Americans are more likely to identify as Christian compared to those in Vietnam. While Christians, primarily Roman Catholics, make up about 10% of Vietnam's population, they make up approximately 36% of the Vietnamese American population. Due to hostility between Communists and Catholics in Vietnam, many Catholics fled the country after the Communist takeover, and many Catholic Churches had sponsored them to the United States.

Many practice Mahayana Buddhism, Taoism, Confucianism and animist practices (including ancestor veneration) influenced by Chinese folk religion. Vietnamese are a major ethnic group notable among Asian American Catholics. Hòa Hảo and Caodaism are two of the other religions of Vietnamese Americans.

There are 150 to 165 Vietnamese Buddhist temples in the United States, with most observing a mixture of Pure Land (Tịnh Độ Tông) and Zen (Thiền) doctrines and practices. Most temples are small, consisting of a converted house with one or two resident monks or nuns. Two of the most prominent figures in Vietnamese American Buddhism are Thich Thien-An and Thich Nhat Hanh. There are also Theravada-based Vietnamese temples like Chua Buu Mon in Port Arthur, Texas.

=== Cuisine ===
Vietnamese immigration to the United States after the Vietnam War (1975) profoundly influenced American cuisine. They opened restaurants to preserve traditions and support families, introducing iconic dishes like phở, bánh mì, and gỏi cuốn, which have since become widely popular and embraced across the country.

Alongside traditional dishes, Vietnamese Americans have introduced notable fusion creations. Garlic noodles, introduced in the 1970s, blend Vietnamese flavors with Italian pasta. Huy Fong sriracha sauce, created in 1980 by a Vietnamese refugee, was originally made for the Vietnamese and other Asian immigrant communities, but has since gained nationwide popularity, becoming a staple in U.S. kitchens.

Viet-Cajun cuisine is another prominent example of fusion, which has flourished in Gulf Coast regions like Louisiana and Texas. Vietnamese Americans in these areas integrated Vietnamese and Cajun culinary elements, creating dishes such as crawfish boils infused with lemongrass, garlic, and other Vietnamese seasonings.

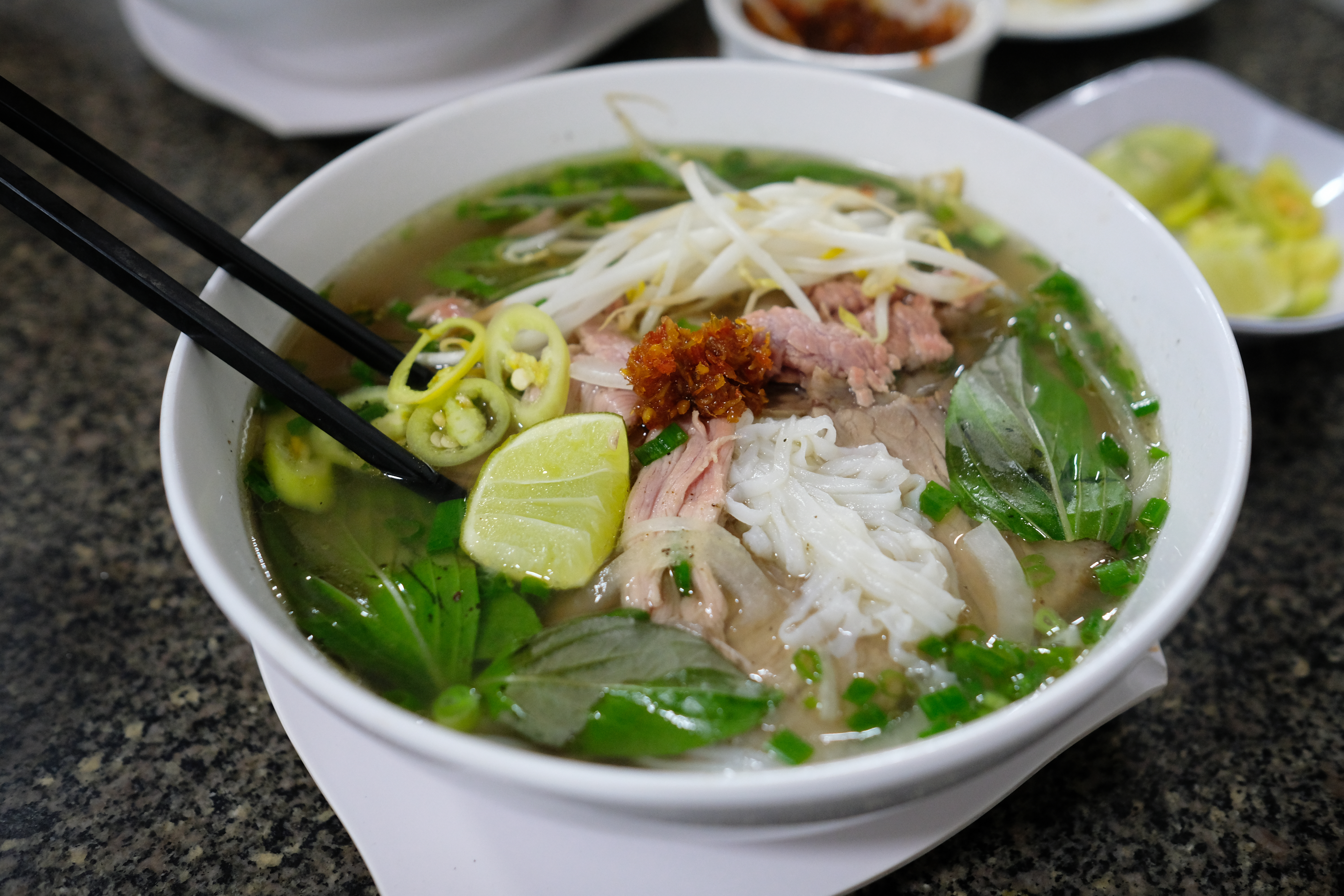
Phở

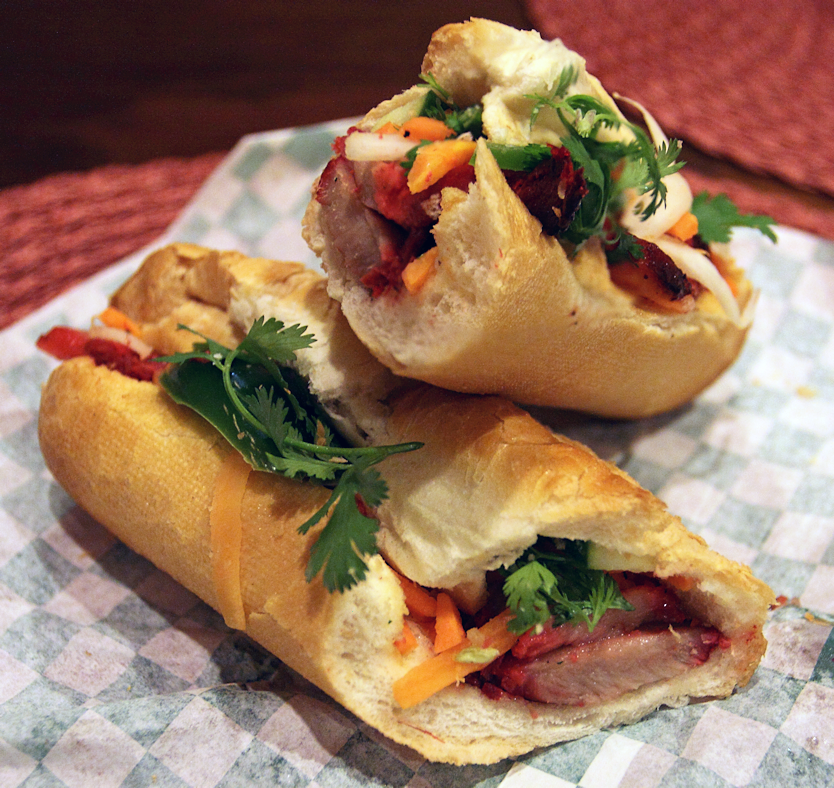
Bánh mì

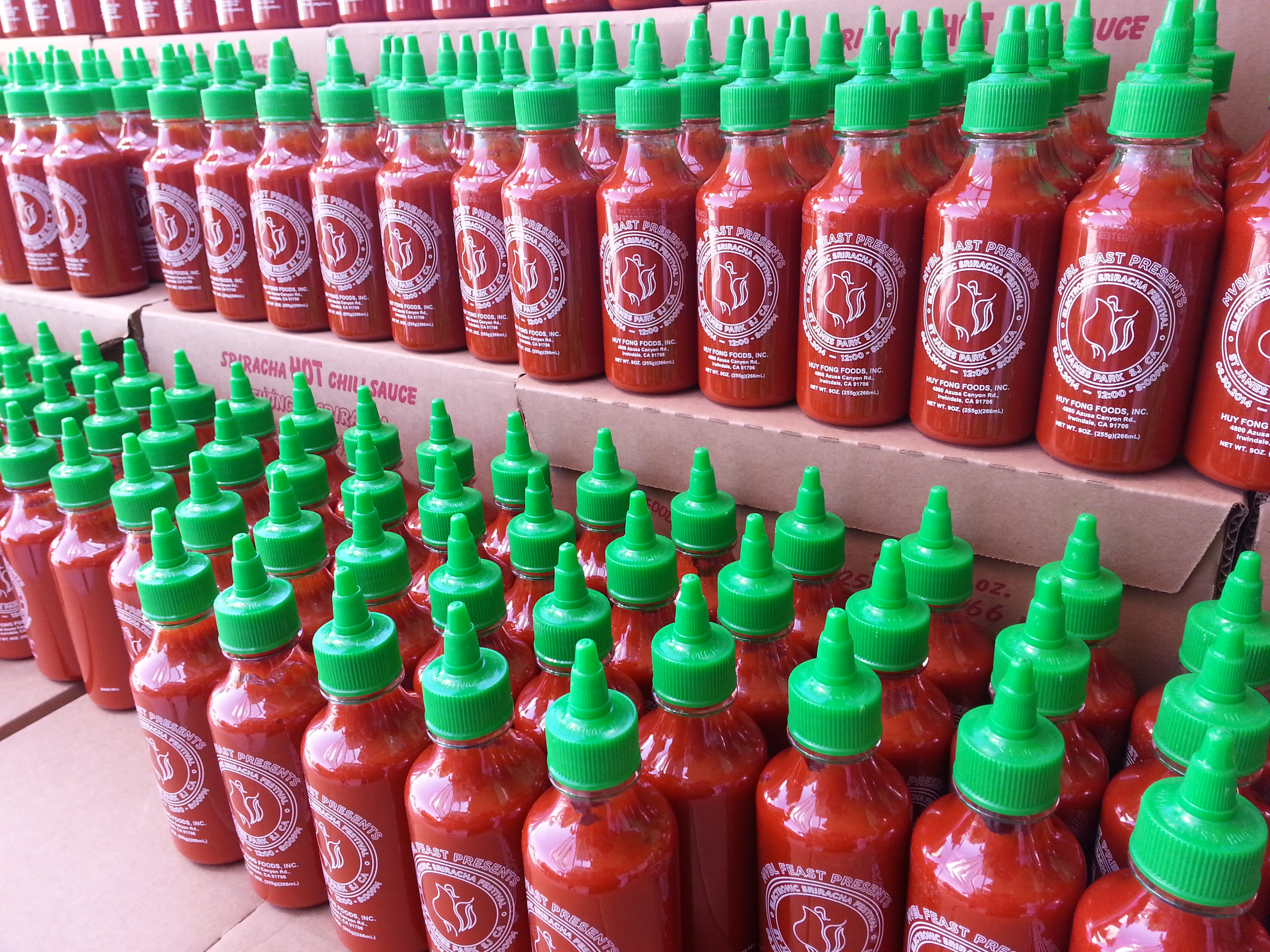
Huy Fong sriracha

=== Festivals and celebrations ===
Vietnamese Americans continue to celebrate Vietnamese lunar calendar holidays, with Tết (Vietnamese New Year) being the most significant. Festivities include activities like bầu cua tôm cá (dice games), múa lân (lion dances), the exchange of lì xì (red envelopes), and sharing festive meals featuring dishes such as bánh chưng, bánh tét, and mứt (candied fruit).

In recent years, Lunar New Year, which includes Tết, has gained recognition in the U.S. California (2022), Colorado (2023), and Washington State (2024) have officially designated it as a state holiday, while New York declared it a school holiday in 2023.

Tết Trung Thu, or the Mid-Autumn Festival, is also widely celebrated by Vietnamese Americans. Much like Tết, cities with sizable Vietnamese communities often organize large-scale Tết Trung Thu festivities that include lion dances, traditional performances, and community-centered activities. The festival is known for its iconic mooncakes and colorful lanterns.

== Politics ==
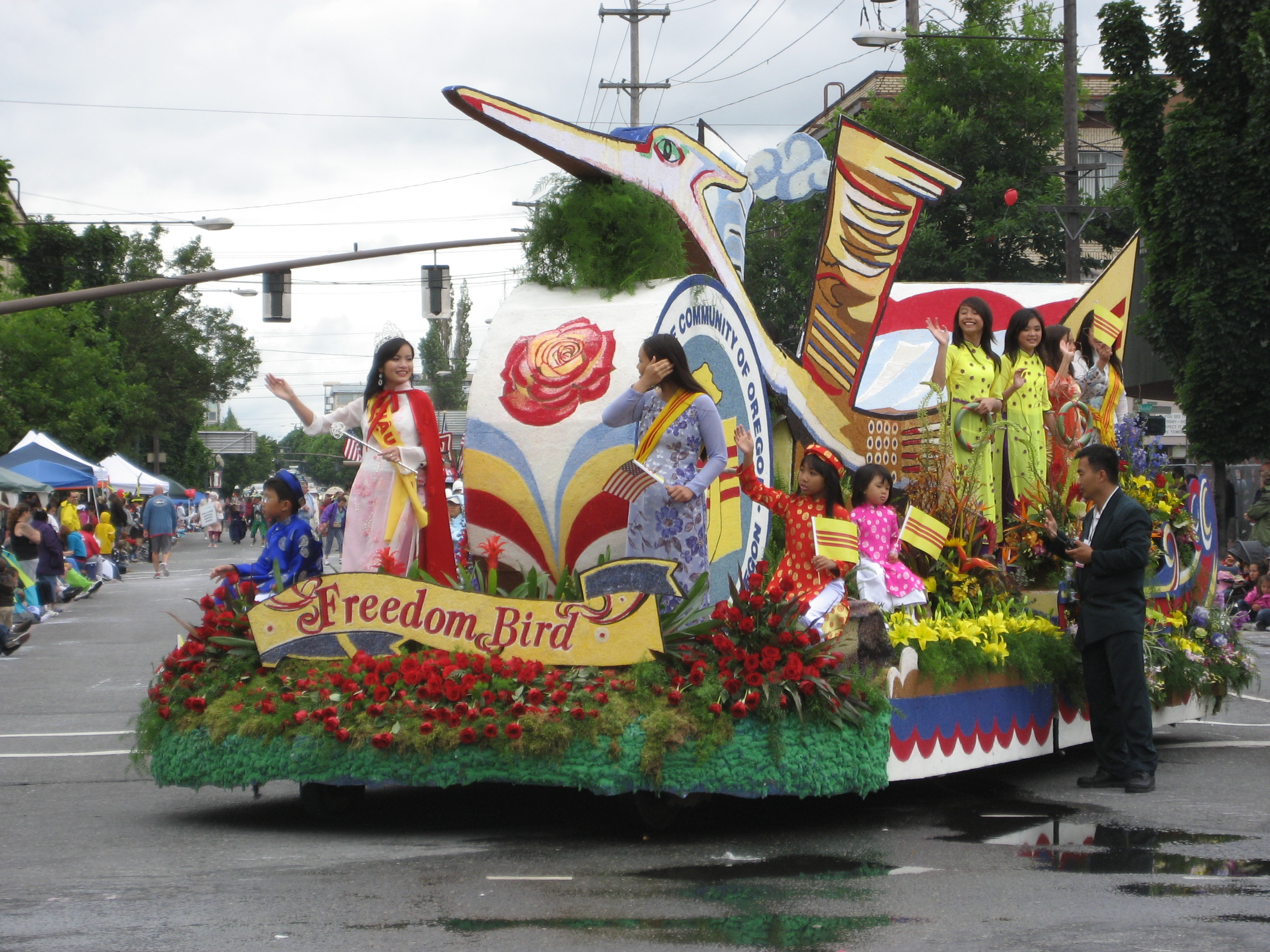
Vietnamese community float at the Portland Rose Festival parade

=== Political preferences and generational differences ===
Vietnamese Americans, shaped by a history of fleeing communism as refugees, tend to lean Republican (51%) more than any other Asian American group. However, in the 2020s, younger Vietnamese Americans are increasingly shifting toward the Democratic Party. Among voters aged 50 and older, 68% identified with or leaned Republican, while 58% of younger voters identified with or leaned Democratic. The younger generation's political preferences are shaped by exposure to diverse viewpoints, including those on economic policy, healthcare, and social justice, which encourage a shift toward progressive values.

Many older, first-generation Vietnamese American refugees who fled communist rule after the Vietnam War exhibit strong patriotism toward the United States, support for the military, and anti-communist views that often align with the Republican Party. The party's vocal anti-communism appealed to those who resettled during the Reagan administration and continued to resonate with many during the 2016 presidential election, particularly due to Donald Trump's anti-China rhetoric. This support persisted despite Trump’s plans to deport some Vietnamese refugees, whom some supporters also "redbait".

Exit polls during the 2004 presidential election indicated that 72 percent of Vietnamese American voters in eight eastern states polled voted for Republican incumbent George W. Bush, compared to the 28 percent voting for Democratic challenger John Kerry. According to the 2008 National Asian American Survey, 22 percent identified with the Democratic Party and 29 percent with the Republican Party. In a poll conducted before the 2008 presidential election, two-thirds of Vietnamese Americans who had decided said that they would vote for Republican candidate John McCain.

Polling data underscores this generational divide. A survey by the Asian American Legal Defense and Education Fund (AALDEF) revealed that Vietnamese Americans aged 18–29 favored Democrat Barack Obama by 60 percentage points during the 2008 presidential election. According to a 2012 Pew Research Center survey, 47% of registered Vietnamese American voters leaned Republican and 32% Democratic. Among Vietnamese Americans overall (including non-registered voters), 36% leaned Democratic and 35% Republican.

==== January 6 United States Capitol attack ====
Several Vietnamese Americans took part in the January 6 United States Capitol attack, with some reportedly waving the South Vietnamese flag and marching alongside neo-Nazi and white nationalist groups. Of the seven Asian individuals charged in connection with the event, five were of Vietnamese descent.

The flag's display during the Capitol riot disappointed many Vietnamese Americans, particularly younger generations, who denounced its association "with hate, with racism, with supremacy." Tung Nguyen, the President of the Progressive Vietnamese American Organization, or PIVOT, argued that "the ideas of authoritarianism, of overturning the people's will, are not the principles that this flag stands for," and expressed feeling embarrassed by the incident, saying it made them "looked like clowns." The event also prompted many young people to question "their elders' unyielding loyalty to and interpretation of the banner's values."

Congresswoman Stephanie Murphy, the first Vietnamese American woman elected to Congress, served on the January 6th Committee, where she co-led a public hearing and contributed to the investigation of the attack on the U.S. Capitol.

=== Notable Vietnamese American politicians ===
- Joseph Cao: Elected in 2008 as a Republican to represent Louisiana’s 2nd congressional district, Cao served one term in the U.S. House of Representatives from 2009 to 2011, becoming the first Vietnamese American to hold this position.
- Stephanie Murphy: Elected in 2016 as a Democrat to represent Florida’s 7th congressional district, Murphy served three terms in Congress from 2017 to 2023, becoming the first Vietnamese American woman and first Vietnamese American Democrat to hold this position. During her tenure, she also served on the January 6th Committee, which investigated the attack on the U.S. Capitol.
- Derek Tran: Elected in 2024 as a Democrat to represent California's 45th congressional district, Tran began serving in the U.S. House of Representatives in 2025, becoming the first Vietnamese American to represent California in Congress.

== Activism ==
=== Opposition to communism ===
According to a 1995 study, the relationship between Vietnam and the United States has been the most important issue for most Vietnamese Americans. As many are refugees from South Vietnam, they are often strongly opposed to communism; this attitude took root during and after the Vietnam War, shaped by atrocities in communist re-education camps and other issues with the government. In a 2000 Orange County Register poll, 71 percent of respondents ranked fighting communism as a "top priority" or "very important." Vietnamese Americans stage protests against the Vietnamese government's policies.

In 1999, opposition to a video-store owner in Westminster, California who displayed the flag of Vietnam and a photo of Ho Chi Minh peaked when 15,000 people held a nighttime vigil in front of the store; this raised free speech issues. Although few Vietnamese Americans enrolled in the Democratic Party because it was seen as more sympathetic to communism than the Republican Party, Republican support has eroded in the second generation and among newer, poorer refugees. However, the Republican Party still has strong support; in 2007, in Orange County, Vietnamese Americans registered as Republicans outnumbered registered Democrats (55 and 22 percent, respectively).

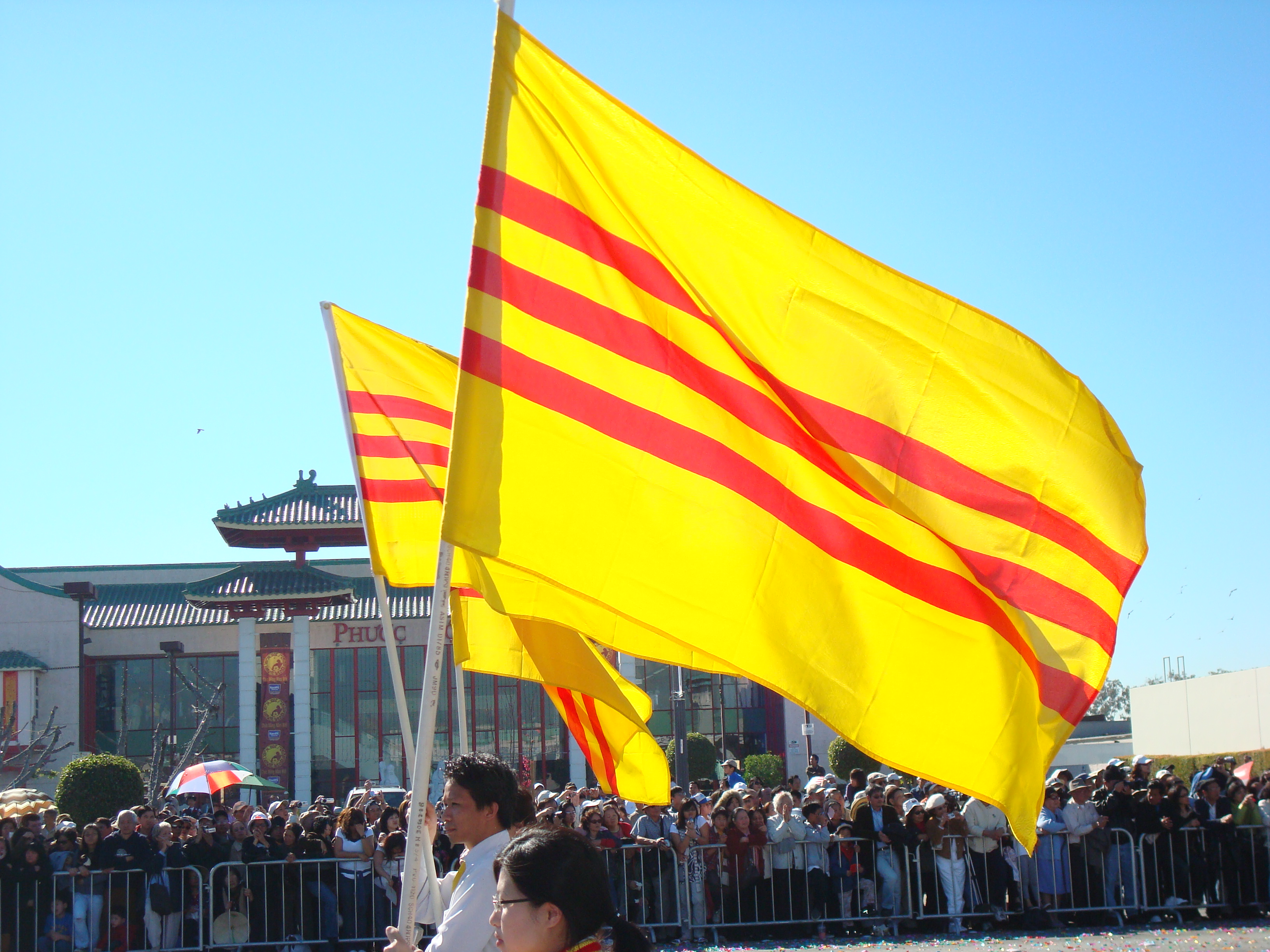
Vietnamese Americans marching with the South Vietnam flag during Tết

=== Advocacy for the South Vietnamese flag ===
The flag of South Vietnam, also known as the Vietnamese Heritage and Freedom Flag, carries significant cultural and historical significance for Vietnamese Americans in the United States, particularly among refugees impacted by the Vietnam War. It serves as a "potent symbol of struggle and pride for Vietnamese Americans." Community leaders describe it embodying "the longing for one’s lost homeland that is felt by so many Vietnamese in the diaspora."

Over the years, the Vietnamese have poured a great deal of resources into getting recognition for the flag across the U.S. By 2023, resolutions recognizing the South Vietnamese flag as the Vietnamese Heritage and Freedom Flag had been adopted by 20 states, 15 counties, and 85 cities.

=== Community activism post-Hurricane Katrina ===
During the months following Hurricane Katrina, the Vietnamese American community in New Orleans (among the first to return to the city) rallied against a landfill used to dump debris near their community. After months of legal wrangling, the landfill was closed.

=== Support for Hong Kong protests ===
Since the onset of Hong Kong protests in June 2019, Vietnamese Americans have been the most active Asian Americans rallying in favor of the pro-democracy (pro-Labor Union) Hongkongers, organizing vocal marches in California, where their largest community exists. They clashed with pro-communist Mainland Chinese immigrants. Trúc Hồ, a famed Vietnamese American singer, wrote a song in July 2019 to praise the Hong Kong protesters. The song went viral among Vietnamese and Hong Kong citizens.

== Ethnic groups ==
Although census data counts those who identify as ethnically Vietnamese, how Vietnamese ethnic groups view themselves may affect that reporting.

=== Hoa ===
The Hoa people are Han Chinese who migrated to Vietnam. In 2013, they made up 11.5 percent of the Vietnamese American population, and in majority, identified itself as Vietnamese. Some Hoa Vietnamese Americans also speak a dialect of Yue Chinese, generally code-switching between Cantonese and Vietnamese to speak to both Hoa immigrants and ethnic Vietnamese. Teochew, a variety of Southern Min which had virtually no speakers in the US before the 1980s, is spoken by another group of Hoa immigrants. A small number of Vietnamese Americans may also speak Mandarin as a third (or fourth) language in business and other interaction.

=== Eurasians and Amerasians ===
Some Vietnamese Americans are Eurasians: people of European and Asian descent. More specifically, descendants of ethnic Vietnamese and French settlers and soldiers (and sometimes Hoa) throughout France's colonial presence in Vietnam between 1887 and 1954.

Amerasians are descendants of an ethnic Vietnamese (or Hoa) parent and an American parent, most commonly white or black. The first substantial generation of Amerasian Vietnamese Americans were born to American personnel, primarily military men, during the later stage of the Vietnam War from 1961 to 1975. Many Amerasians were ignored by their American parent; in Vietnam, the fatherless children of foreign men were called con lai ("mixed race") or the pejorative bụi đời ("dust of life"). Since 1982, Amerasians and their families have come to the United States under the Orderly Departure Program. Many could not be reunited with their fathers, and commonly arrived with their mothers. In some cases, they were part of false families that were created to escape from Vietnam. Many of the first-generation Amerasians and their mothers experienced significant social and institutional discrimination in Vietnam, where they were denied the right to education; discrimination worsening after the 1973 American withdrawal, and by the U.S. government, which discouraged American military personnel from marrying Vietnamese nationals and frequently refused claims of U.S. citizenship that were lodged by Amerasians born in Vietnam if their mothers were not married to their American fathers.

Discrimination was even greater for children of black servicemen than for children of white fathers. Subsequent generations of Amerasians born in the United States and Vietnamese-born Amerasians whose American paternity was documented by their parents' marriage or their subsequent legitimization have had an arguably more favorable outlook.

The 1988 American Homecoming Act helped over 25,000 Amerasians and their 67,000 relatives in Vietnam, to emigrate to the United States. Although they received permanent-resident status, many have been unable to obtain citizenship and express a lack of belonging or acceptance in the US because of differences in culture, language and citizenship status.

=== Thai and Lao ===
The Thái peoples, including the Laotians, Nungs and other Tai ethnicities who migrated to the United States were majority from Northern Vietnam. The community, overall, do not develop a separate ethnic identity sentiment due to long friendly relations with the Vietnamese rulers, thus the community don't regard itself Thai Americans or Laotian Americans, and see itself part of Vietnamese American diaspora.

=== Cham ===
Cham are an ethnic minority of Vietnam and Cambodia, and a small number of them came to the United States as refugees fleeing the Cambodian genocide. The main Cham populations in the United States are located in Orange County, California, Portland, and Seattle.

=== Montagnards ===
In 1975, thousands of Montagnards fled to Cambodia after the fall of Saigon to the North Vietnamese Army, fearing that the new government would launch reprisals against them because they had aided the U.S. Army. The U.S. military resettled some Montagnards in the United States, primarily in North Carolina, but these evacuees numbered less than 2,000.

Outside of southeast Asia, the largest community of Montagnards in the world is located in Greensboro, North Carolina, US. Greensboro is also the home of several community and lobbying organizations, such as the Montagnard Foundation, Inc.

== See also ==
- Asian Americans
- List of Vietnamese Americans
- List of Vietnamese American groups
- List of U.S. cities with large Vietnamese-American populations
- Vietnam–United States relations
- Vietnamese language in the United States
