= Bụi đời =

Vietnamese term for urban vagrants

The Vietnamese term bụi đời (Vietnamese pronunciation: [ʔɓuj˧˨ʔ ʔɗəːj˨˩], "life of dust" or "dusty life") refers to vagrants in the city or, trẻ bụi đời to street children or juvenile gangs. From 1989, following a song in the musical Miss Saigon, "Bui-Doi" came to popularity in Western lingo, referring to Amerasian children left behind in Vietnam after the Vietnam War.

== Rural poor coming to the towns ==
The term bụi đời ("dust of life") originally referred to the starving people of the countryside taking refuge in towns, in the 1930s. The term trẻ bụi đời "young vagrants," now refers to street children or juvenile gang members. It is intended to bring to mind an image of a child abandoned and moving about without purpose, like dust. In Vietnamese, it has no racial connotation. Vietnamese refer to Amerasians as Mỹ lai (mixed American and Vietnamese), con lai (mixed-race child), or người lai (mixed-race person).

The connection to mixed-race parentage given in Western media, from connection with Miss Saigon, is not widely known in Vietnam today. The term bụi đời in Vietnam today refers to any people, but usually, young men, who live on the street or live as wanderers. A related verb đi bụi ("go dust") means someone who has left their home, usually due to arguments with their family, to take on the bụi đời wandering or street life.

== Miss Saigon and Amerasian orphans ==
In the West, the term Bui-Doi became widely known from the use in the dialogue, and particularly the song title "Bui-Doi", of 1989 musical Miss Saigon by Claude-Michel Schönberg and Alain Boublil, which opened in 1991 on Broadway, and, until its closing in 2001, was the thirteenth longest-running Broadway musical in musical theater history. The song "Bui-Doi" had lyrics written by Alain Boublil and Richard Maltby, Jr. They took the term bụi đời to mean not Vietnamese street children, but the Amerasian offspring of Vietnamese women and American soldiers abandoned at the end of the Vietnam War.

== Mixed race children in Vietnam ==
The majority of mixed-race people after the Vietnam War were Amerasians or children of Vietnamese mothers and military or civilian men from the United States. Amerasians born during the Vietnam War (1965–73) could be the issue of anything from long-term unions to rape. Due to the large sex industry brought on by the military economy, Amerasians were predominantly seen as off-spring of prostitute mothers and G.I. fathers. Life was frequently difficult for such Amerasians; they existed as pariahs in Vietnamese society. Under the Amerasian Homecoming Act of 1988, a Vietnamese Amerasian could obtain a U.S. visa based on appearance alone. Amerasians gained the attention of con artists who claimed to be their relatives in the hope of obtaining visas. About 23,000 Amerasians immigrated to the U.S. under this act.

In the United States, bui doi, or the term "dust of life", again referred to the criminal class, where the youths included newly transplanted Vietnamese and Amerasians. The misuse of the word bui doi also migrated to the United States and was appropriated by the mainstream.

== In popular culture ==
The 1977 made-for-TV "Green Eyes" is a fictional movie about an American veteran who makes a trip back to Southeast Asia to search for his son from a liaison with a Vietnamese woman. He encounters a boy with green eyes who insists that he must be half American and thus eligible to go to America.

The 1994 documentary film Bui doi: Life Like Dust uses the term to describe Ricky Phan, a Vietnamese refugee who turned to a life of crime after escaping from Vietnam to California.

The 2004 movie The Beautiful Country depicts the life of a fictional bui doi and his efforts to become reunited with his American father. Its prologue opens with a definition: "Bui Doi: 'less than dust' Term used to describe Vietnamese children with American fathers."

The 2014 movie Noble is a biopic of Christina Noble, who overcomes the harsh difficulties of her childhood in Ireland to find her calling by helping the bụi đời on the streets of Ho Chi Minh City.

== See also ==
- Lai Đại Hàn
- Konketsuji
  - GI Baby
- Luk khrueng
- Lebensborn
