= Left by the Ship =

Italian documentary film

Left by the Ship is a 2010 documentary film directed by Emma Rossi Landi and Alberto Vendemmiati following two years in the life of four Filipino Amerasians, co-produced by Italian production company VisitorQ, together with Rai Cinema, ITVS international (USA) and YLE (Finland). The film was shot in the Philippines, mostly in the town of Olongapo, between 2007 and 2009.

== Background ==
For more than 50 years, thousands of American servicemen were stationed at Subic Bay in the Philippines. Many of these men fathered children with the women who lived nearby. Throughout the decades, and in particular when the base closed in 1992, thousands of Amerasian children were left behind, stripped of their fathers and their sense of identity. While Amerasian children from other countries like Vietnam benefit from the law known as the Amerasian Homecoming Act, Filipino Amerasians cannot. The film follows the lives of four Amerasians in the Philippines today as the struggle to overcome a past they are in no way responsible for.

== Awards ==
Left by the Ship won best documentary feature at the Guam Film Festival, the Cinema.Doc prize at the Festival dei Popoli, Best Global Documentary at the International Film Festival Manhattan, 2011 and Best Social Justice film at the Disorient film Festival among others. It was also presented at the San Diego Asian American Film Festival, Artivist Film Festival in Hollywood, at the San Francisco Doc Fest and at Oaxaca Film Fest. The TV version of the film aired on PBS Independent Lens on May 24, 2012.
