= The Beautiful Country =

Drama Film

- Theatrical release poster
- Directed by: Hans Petter Moland
- Screenplay by: Sabina Murray
- Story by: Sabina Murray; Terrence Malick (as Lingard Jervey)
- Produced by: Terrence Malick; Edward R. Pressman; Tomas Backström; Petter J. Borgli
- Starring: Damien Nguyen; Bai Ling; Tim Roth; Nick Nolte; Temuera Morrison
- Cinematography: Stuart Dryburgh
- Edited by: Wibecke Rønseth
- Music by: Zbigniew Preisner
- Production companies: Dinamo Story; Sunflower Productions; Nordic Film och TV Fund; Norsk Filmfond; SF Norge Filmparken; Samy Boy Entertainment; Sud-Est Productions
- Distributed by: Sony Pictures Classics (North America)
- Release dates: February 8, 2004 (Berlinale); July 5, 2005 (United States)
- Running time: 125 minutes
- Countries: United States; Norway
- Languages: Vietnamese; English
- Budget: $6 million
- Box office: $878,325

The Beautiful Country is a 2004 drama film set in 1990. It is directed by Hans Petter Moland and stars Damien Nguyen, Nick Nolte, Bai Ling, Chau Thi Kim Xuan, Tim Roth, Anh Thu, Temuera Morrison and John Hussey. The screenplay was written by Sabina Murray, from a story by Murray and Terrence Malick (under the pseudonym Lingard Jervey)

== Plot summary ==
The film tells the story of Binh, a Vietnamese Amerasian boy who is often referred to as a "bui doi" (a derogatory term which has come to refer to a Vietnamese-born child fathered by an American soldier during the Vietnam War). After a life of prejudice and servitude, Binh decides to leave his tiny Vietnamese village and search for his mother in Saigon. Binh finds his mother, Mai, and discovers he has a younger brother, energetic and precocious Tam. Mai is employed by Mrs. Hoa, the cruel mistress of a great house. After getting a job at the house with his mother, Binh discovers that she is sexually harassed constantly by Mrs. Hoa's son.

While dusting with his mother, Binh lifts a red glass statue of Buddha, a precious family heirloom, to allow his mother to dust. As Binh lifts the statue to see it glow in the sun, the mistress walks in and charges Binh, calling him a thief. As Binh tries to keep the Buddha safe in his arms, the mistress slips on a wet patch of the floor, falling to her death. Binh and his mother quickly escape the house back to their apartment. They frantically pack the belongings of Binh and Tam. His mother gives them American money, the address of Binh's American father, and passage on a boat.

Binh and Tam both make it onto a boat bound for the United States, but a storm knocks them off course and instead takes them to Malaysia. Stuck in a refugee camp, Binh and Tam adapt to their new circumstances and meet Ling, a Chinese prostitute whose passage to America was also detoured to Malaysia. Binh and Ling seem to develop feelings for each other, kissing after Ling sings a ballad in Mandarin and dances for him.

Ling had been selling sexual favors for some time (though she dreams of a life as a singer) and had managed to buy herself, Binh, and Tam's way out of the refugee complex and onto a barge captained by the British Captain Oh. During the voyage Binh, Ling, and Tam suffer shortages of food and fresh water. A gambling game (two contenders shout off American brand names in succession) threatens the other passengers by unfairly winning their food, water, and money. Several people succumb to the conditions, as does little Tam. A heartbroken Binh and Ling give him a funeral at sea.

The immigrants finally reach the United States, but are quickly rushed into transport trucks, bound for Chinatown in New York City. Binh works at a Chinese restaurant as a delivery boy and Ling works in a Chinatown cabaret, though she still keeps prostitution as her main source of income. Ling eventually meets a wealthy businessman to support her. Binh's feelings for Ling go unanswered. Binh sends a letter explaining Tam's death to his mother, along with all the money he had saved thus far.

Binh finds out (over a poker game with his friends) that Vietnamese children born to American fathers are allowed free airplane passage to the United States and granted citizenship. Angry because he didn't have to lose his brother, he promptly leaves his job and hitch hikes toward Houston, Texas, meeting amputee Vietnam War veterans and a Hispanic family along the way. Upon reaching the address Binh finds a woman, his father's ex-wife. His father had relocated after their divorce, working as a handyman at a ranch in Sweetwater, Texas. Binh is finally confronted with his father, blinded after opening a crate filled with explosives he thought was beer during the war. While Binh doesn't confess that he's his son, his father realizes it and the film ends with Binh and his father talking and getting to know each other as he cuts his father's hair.

== Cast ==
- Damien Nguyen as Binh
- Nick Nolte as Steve
- Tim Roth as Captain Oh
- Bai Ling as Ling
- Temuera Morrison as Snakehead
- Thi Kim Xuan Chau as Mai
- Dang Quoc Thinh Tran as Tam
- Arthur J. Nascarella as Griff

== Reception ==
=== Box office ===
The Beautiful Country grossed $878,325 around the world from a budget of approximately $6 million.

=== Critical response ===
On the review aggregator website Rotten Tomatoes, the film has an approval rating of 78% based on 76 reviews, with an average rating of 6.8/10. The site's critical consensus reads, "The plight of Asian refugees is sensitively rendered, and the movie builds, with the help of Nolte, to a wrenchingly poignant conclusion." On Metacritic, the film has a score of 64 out of 100, based on 23 critics, indicating "generally favorable reviews".

== See also ==
- Amerasian
- Bui doi
