= Mabel Grammer =

African-American journalist

Mabel Grammer (December 23, 1913 – June 5, 2002) was an African-American journalist. Her "Brown Baby Plan" led to the adoption of 500 mixed race German orphans after World War II.

== Early life ==
Grammer was born in Hot Springs, Arkansas to Pearl and Edward Treadwell. As a child she suffered from peritonitis, which ruptured her appendix. After she recovered, she found her illness left her infertile.

She graduated from Ohio State University with a journalism degree. During the 1940s she was a civil rights activist and wrote for the Washington Afro-American.

== Germany ==
She married Oscar Grammer in 1950, and moved to Mannheim, Germany with him when he was stationed there by the United States military. While there, Grammer visited orphanages and learned that mixed German and African American children were not being adopted because of the stigma against mixed race children. She began adopting 12 children over the years that she lived in Germany.

Grammer publicized the issue in the United States, writing regular announcements and articles in the Afro-American, a Baltimore newspaper, from 1951 to 1954. She encouraged African American families to adopt these German children, calling it the "Brown Baby Plan". She arranged for the adoption of German children into American families, working with so many German organizations that it is difficult to count how many children she helped. Working with the Refugee Relief Act, International Social Service, and American international adoption agencies generated a lot of red tape, so she acted as a private agency, simplifying the process for German orphanages and prospective parents. This also shielded parents from those at American adoption agencies who discriminated against African Americans.

Her work was viewed very favorably by the German press, who called her "Mommie Mabel, the mother of the colored occupation babies". However, she was criticized by the German Child Welfare Office because she did not have a system in place or connections with American social welfare services to check up on the children after they were adopted. She was also criticized by American adoption agencies for the same reason.

In 1965, her family returned to the United States and settled in Washington, D.C. In 1968, Grammer received a humanitarian award from Pope Paul VI. Her adopted daughter Nadja West became the first Black and 44th Surgeon General of the United States Army and a Commanding General of the United States Army Medical Command.

Grammer died of hypertension on June 5, 2002.

== See also ==
- Miki Sawada, who did similar work with mixed race orphans in Japan
