= Miki Sawada =

Japanese social worker

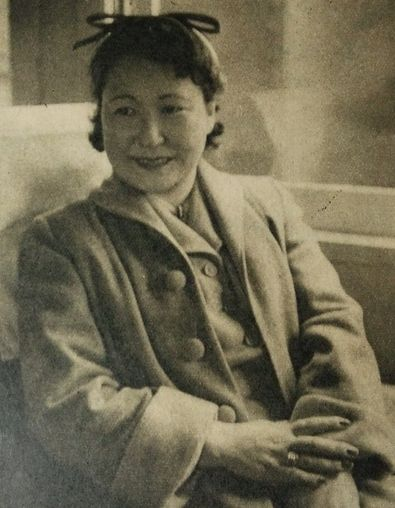
- Miki Sawada in 1952
- Born: 19 September 1901
- Died: 12 May 1980 (aged 78)
- Occupation: Social worker

Miki Sawada (澤田 美喜, Sawada Miki; 19 September 1901 – 12 May 1980) was a Japanese social worker popularly known as the "mother of 2,000" American Japanese mixed orphans.

== Early life ==
She was born in Tokyo, Japan on 19 September 1901. She was the oldest daughter of Baron Hisaya Iwasaki, who was known as the richest man in Japan. She was thus the granddaughter of Iwasaki Yataro, the founder of the Mitsubishi Zaibatsu conglomerate. As a child, she attended private girls' schools in Ochanomizu until she was 15. After that she was taught by Umeko Tsuda, her private tutor.

In 1922, she married Japanese diplomat Renzo Sawada, who represented Japan as a diplomat and United Nations ambassador. He was a Christian, and she converted to Christianity upon her marriage to him. They had four children.

== Elizabeth Saunders Home ==
Renzo's diplomatic work took them to Buenos Aires, Beijing, London, Paris, and New York City. During her life outside Japan as the wife of a diplomat, she met and befriended many people who later helped her found the Elizabeth Saunders Home, such as Josephine Baker. While living in London, she visited an orphanage operated by Thomas John Barnardo called Dr. Barnardo's Home, which later inspired her to start her own.

After World War II, Sawada took many mixed-race children, or konketsuji, into her house. In 1948, she sold all of her possessions and used the money to found the Elizabeth Saunders Home in Oiso, Kanagawa, Japan. It was named after the British governess whose charitable bequest, made through the Anglican Church in Japan, was the first donation Sawada received to fund the home. In 1950, the Kanagawa Prefectural Government recognized the home as a public child welfare institution, which Sawada claimed eased her financial burden significantly.

Just over 700 mixed-race children stayed at the home. Mitsubishi, the conglomerate founded by Sawada's grandfather, cites her as the "Mother of 2,000 Children".

Contemporary historians, particularly Kristin Roebuck, have complicated the narrative surrounding Sawada's treatment of mixed-race orphans, claiming that her humanitarian belief in adoption might have been compromised by a belief that konketsuji had to be segregated from Japanese society. Sawada's 1953 book Konketsuji no Haha contains an anecdote in which a grandmother gives up a konketsuji child for adoption without her daughter's consent; when the daughter comes to reclaim it, Sawada refuses to give it up and tells her to "learn shame." A "no visitation" policy was instituted at the home by 1952. In her annual trips to the United States, Sawada gave speeches implying that the impermeability of American immigration for konketsuji might create "a situation the Communists easily turn into propaganda."

Many of those she met during her travels adopted children from the orphanage, including Josephine Baker, who also put on concerts to benefit the orphanage.

Sawada was awarded the Order of the Sacred Treasure, second class on 29 April 1972. In 1960 she was the recipient of the Elizabeth Blackwell Award, given by Hobart and William Smith Colleges to a woman whose life exemplifies outstanding service to humanity.

She died of a heart attack in Mallorca on 12 May 1980.

== See also ==
- Mabel Grammer, who conducted similar work with mixed race orphans in Germany
