= Nadja West =

Surgeon General of the US Army

Nadja Y. West
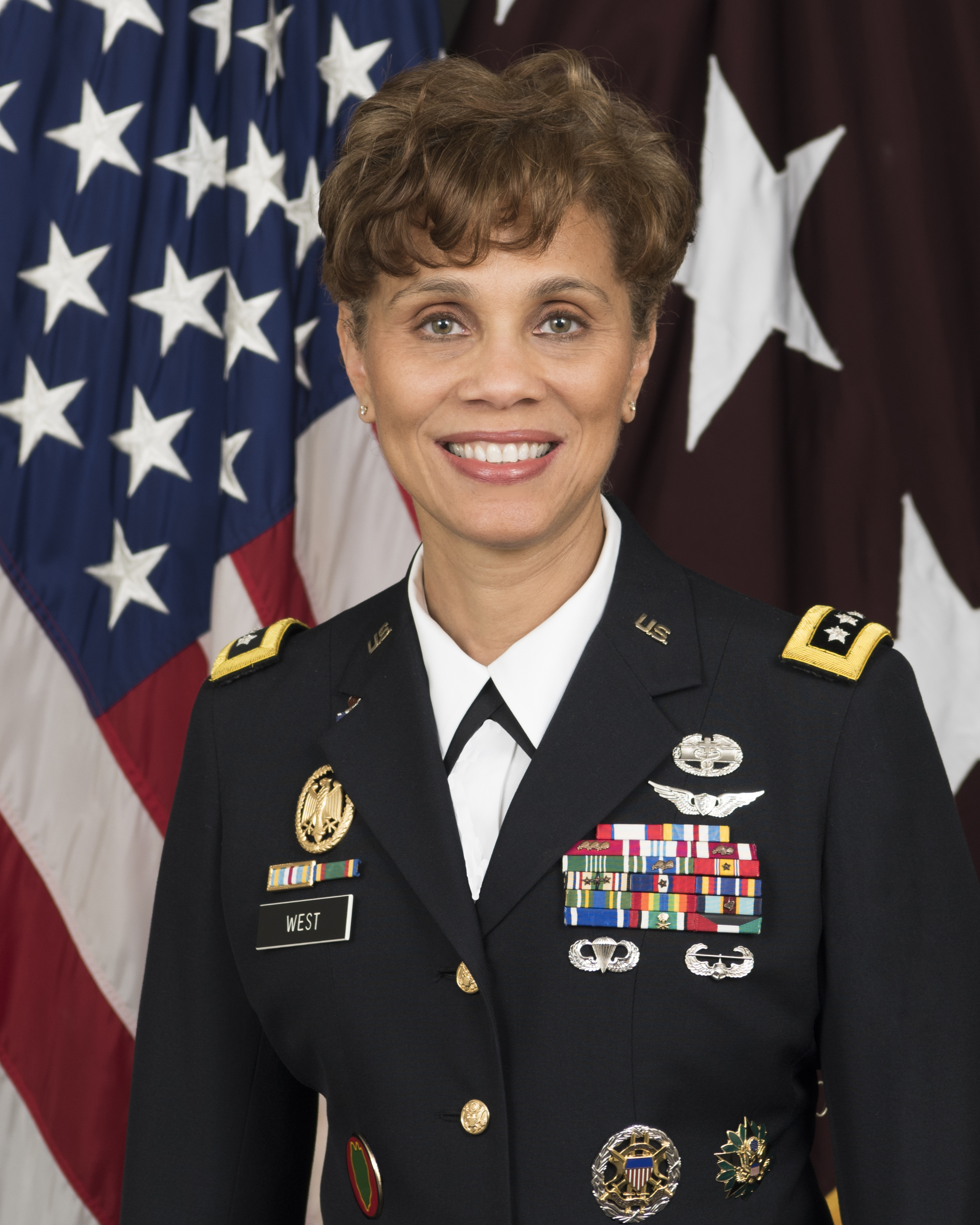
- Born: March 20, 1961 (age 65); Washington, D.C., United States
- Alma mater: United States Military Academy (BS); George Washington University School of Medicine (MD)
- Military career
- Allegiance: United States
- Branch: United States Army
- Service years: 1982–2019
- Rank: Lieutenant General
- Commands: Surgeon General of the United States Army; United States Army Medical Command; Europe Regional Medical Command; Womack Army Medical Center; McDonald Army Community Hospital
- Conflicts: Gulf War
- Awards: Army Distinguished Service Medal (2); Defense Superior Service Medal; Legion of Merit (4)

Nadja Yudith West (née Grammer; March 20, 1961) is a retired United States Army lieutenant general and the 44th Surgeon General of the United States Army and former Commanding General of the United States Army Medical Command. West, a physician, was the first black Army Surgeon General, and was the first black female active-duty major general and the first black female major general in Army Medicine. West is also the first Army black female lieutenant general. She is the highest ranking woman to have graduated from the United States Military Academy.

== Early life and education ==
West was an orphan but was adopted at two years old into a family in the District of Columbia with eleven other adopted children total. Her adoptive parents were Mabel (née Treadwell) and Oscar Grammer. Her father was a career soldier and her mother was a journalist and founder of the "Brown Baby Plan", arranging adoptions of mixed German and African American children following the US military presence in Germany during and after the Second World War. She graduated high school at the Academy of the Holy Names in Silver Spring, Maryland. In 1982, West obtained a Bachelor's degree in Engineering from the United States Military Academy at West Point, and a Doctorate of Medicine from George Washington University School of Medicine in 1988.

== Career ==
West's historic promotion to be the second black female major general took place on April 19, 2013. Of her promotion, West said, "I never really thought about that part. My parents taught me to work hard and be the best I can be and things will work out. I'm just really honored. If anything at all, I hope I can be an inspiration to any one or any group that has not seen themselves in certain positions. We all want to see people who look like us doing certain things to give us inspiration. Hopefully, I can inspire someone to be able to say, 'I can do that.'"

She has claimed an early, positive influence was seeing a black, female character (Uhura) on the bridge of Star Trek's USS Enterprise (NCC-1701).

On December 11, 2015, the Senate confirmed the nomination of West to be promoted to lieutenant general and she became the 44th Army Surgeon General. This made West the Army's first black Surgeon General, as well as the Army's first black woman to hold the rank of lieutenant general and the Army's highest ranking woman who graduated from the United States Military Academy. Lt. Gen. West was promoted on February 9, 2016, and formally assumed command of MEDCOM on February 10, 2016.

West completed her Family Medicine internship and residency at Martin Army Hospital. She deployed during Operation Desert Storm and Operation Desert Shield while assigned there. West finished her residency in dermatology at Fitzsimons Army Medical Center and University of Colorado Medical Center. She was Chief, Dermatology Service at Heidelberg Army Hospital in Germany. West obtained a Master of Science in National Security Strategy. Of her military medical career, West says, "If you want to feel inspired about what military medicine does, see how appreciative these men and women are for the care they've received. It's right here. It's the reason the military health system exists: to take care of brave men and women like them."

West's previous command positions include Commanding General, Europe Regional Medical Command; Commander, Womack Army Medical Center; and Division Surgeon, 1st Armored Division, Army Europe and Seventh Army, Germany. West was Joint Staff Surgeon, Joint Staff, Washington.

West is a Fellow of the American Academy of Dermatology and the American Academy of Family Physicians.

Johnson & Johnson announced on December 3, 2020, that West has been appointed to its board of directors effective immediately. West will serve as a member of the Board's Science, Technology & Sustainability Committee, effective as of January 1, 2021. As a non-employee director of the company, West will receive compensation as described in the "Director Compensation" section of the company's 2020 Proxy Statement. In April 2022, West was appointed to the Board of Visitors of the United States Military Academy.

== Personal life ==
West is a Roman Catholic.

== Awards and recognitions ==
Left breast

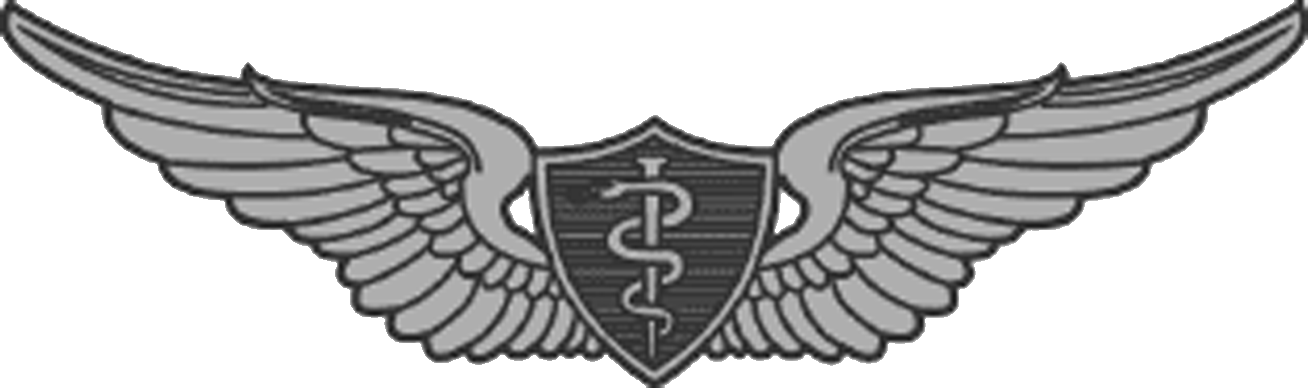

Combat Medical Badge
Basic Flight Surgeon Badge
Army Distinguished Service Medal with one bronze oak leaf cluster		Defense Superior Service Medal
Legion of Merit with three oak leaf clusters	Defense Meritorious Service Medal	Meritorious Service Medal with two oak leaf clusters
Army Commendation Medal	Army Achievement Medal with two oak leaf clusters	National Defense Service Medal with one bronze service star
Southwest Asia Service Medal with three service stars	Kosovo Campaign Medal with one service star	Global War on Terrorism Service Medal
Korea Defense Service Medal	Army Service Ribbon	Army Overseas Service Ribbon with award numeral 4
NATO Medal for the former Yugoslavia	Kuwait Liberation Medal (Saudi Arabia)	Kuwait Liberation Medal (Kuwait)
Parachutist Badge		Air Assault Badge
Office of the Joint Chiefs of Staff Identification Badge		Army Staff Identification Badge

Right breast

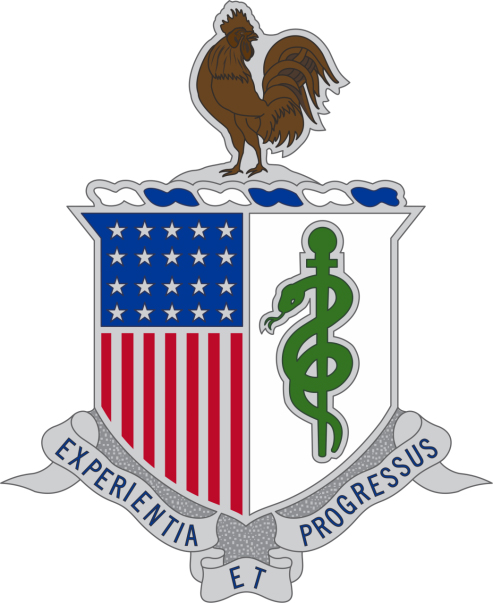
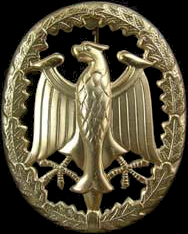
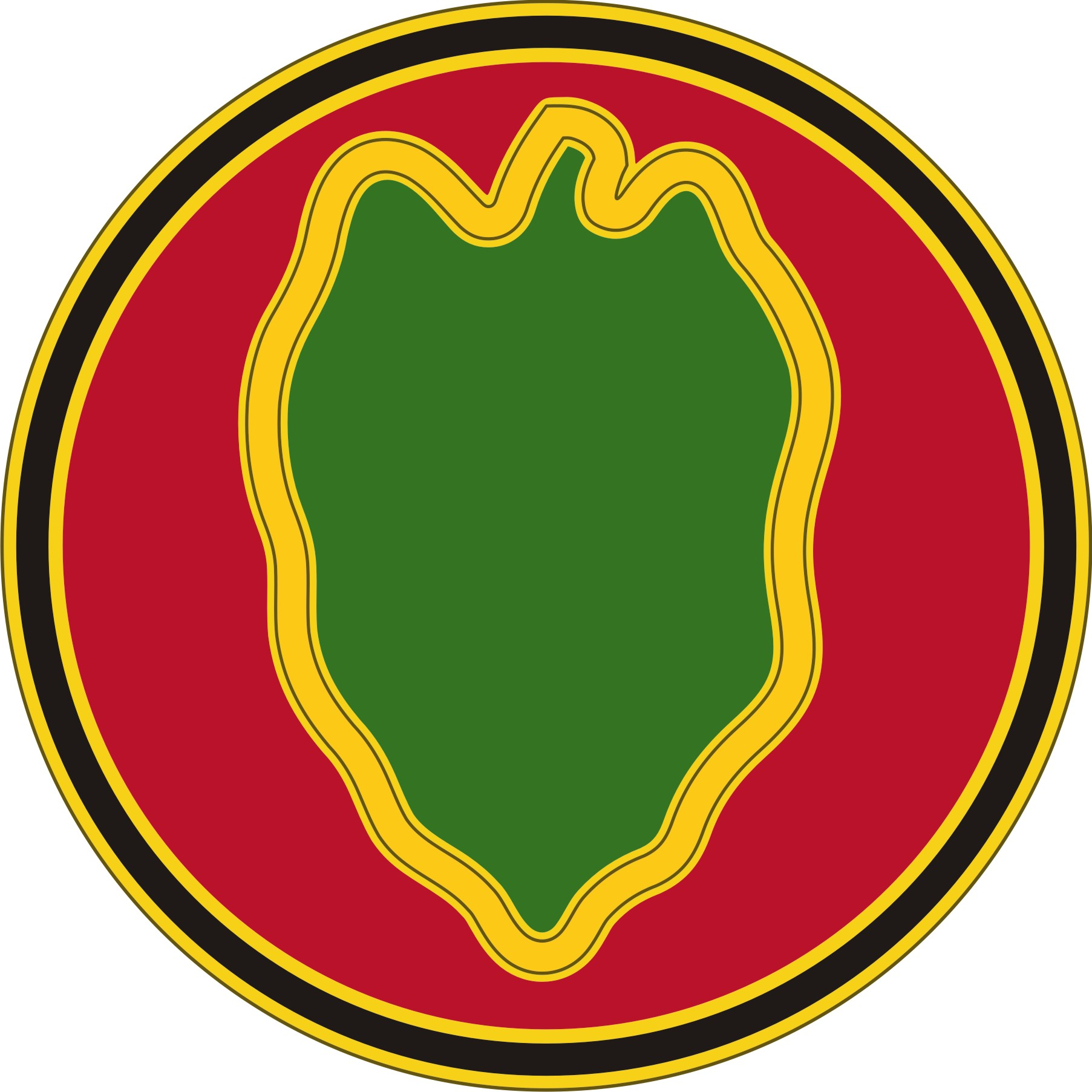

Army Medical Department (AMEDD); Distinctive unit insignia
German Armed Forces Badge for Military Proficiency in Gold
Joint Meritorious Unit Award	Navy Unit Commendation
24th Infantry Division CSIB

- In 2017, the American Legion of Honor Society awarded West with the "Four Chaplains Gold Medallion" award.

Military offices
Preceded by Patricia Horoho	Surgeon General of the United States Army; December 11, 2015 – August 2019	Succeeded by R. Scott Dingle
