= Kien Nguyen =

Vietnamese-American author

Kien Nguyen (Vietnamese: Nguyễn Kiên; born in Nha Trang, South Vietnam, 1967) is an Vietnamese author.

== Early life and family ==
Nguyen's mother was a banker from a once wealthy family, and his father was an American civil engineer. His mother's family, who had lost their wealth when the Americans left Vietnam, lived among neighbors who treated them as pariahs because of their background connected to the Americans, which the communist government had seen as evil capitalists. Nguyen, a child of mixed race, was especially ostracized from the community.

== Career ==
He left Vietnam in 1985 through the United Nations "Orderly Departure Program." After spending time at a refugee camp in the Philippines, he arrived in the United States and became a dentist. He practiced dentistry in New York, NY; New York University College of Dentistry, New York, clinical instructor in general dentistry and management science.

== Personal life ==
Nguyen lives in California.

== Awards ==
- Grinzane Cavour Prize, 1998.

== Published works ==
- The Unwanted, a Memoir of Childhood, Little Brown & Co (2001) ISBN 0-316-28664-8 - The Unwanted: A Memoir of Childhood A childhood memoir, written in first person, with the reader seeing the boy grow, in South Vietnam, until the book's ending at age 18, on his way to the U.S.
- The Tapestries, Little Brown & Co. (2002) ISBN 0-316-28441-6 The Tapestries
- Le Colonial, Little Brown & Co. (2004) ISBN 0-316-28501-3 Le Colonial
