= Amerasian Homecoming Act =

Immigration legislation

The American Homecoming Act or Amerasian Homecoming Act was an Act of Congress giving preferential immigration status to children in Vietnam born of U.S. fathers. The Amerasian Homecoming Act was written in 1987, passed in 1988, and implemented in 1989. The act increased Vietnamese Amerasian immigration to the U.S. because it allowed applicants to establish a mixed race identity by appearance alone. Additionally, the Amerasian Homecoming Act allowed the Amerasian children and their immediate relatives to receive refugee benefits. About 23,000 Amerasians and 67,000 of their relatives entered the United States under this act. While the Amerasian Homecoming Act was the most successful program in moving Vietnamese Amerasian children to the United States, the act was not the first attempt by the U.S. government. Additionally the act experienced flaws and controversies over the refugees it did and did not include since the act only allowed Vietnamese Amerasian children, as opposed to other South East Asian nations in which the United States also had forces in the war.

== Background ==
In April 1975, the U.S.-backed government of South Vietnam fell to North Vietnamese forces. Refugees from Vietnam started to arrive in the United States under U.S. government programs. In 1982, the U.S. Congress passed the Amerasian Immigration Act (PL 97-359). The law prioritized U.S. immigration to children fathered by U.S. citizens including from Korea, Laos, Cambodia, Vietnam, and Thailand. However, the law did not provide immigration to mothers or half-siblings, only to Amerasian children. Amerasians would generally have to coordinate with their American fathers in order to obtain a visa. This provided a challenge for many since some fathers did not know they had children and many American fathers may not have wanted to claim the children. If the Amerasian children did not have documentation from the American father, then they could be examined for "American" physical features by a group of doctors. Additionally, since the U.S. and Vietnam's governments did not have diplomatic relations, the law could not be applied to Vietnamese Amerasian children. Essentially the Amerasian Immigration Act did little for Amerasian children and even less for Vietnamese Amerasian children.

As a way to address Vietnamese Amerasian children, the U.S. government permitted another route for Vietnamese-born children of American soldiers to the United States. The children would be classified as immigrants, but would also be eligible to receive refugee benefits. The U.S. and Vietnam governments established the Orderly Departure Program (ODP). The program is housed in the United Nations High Commission for Refugees (UNHCR). The ODP created a system where South Vietnamese soldiers and others connected to the U.S. war effort could emigrate from Vietnam to the United States. Initially the Amerasian children had to have documentation from their American fathers to be issued a visa, however the program eventually expanded to individuals that did not have firm documentation. The Orderly Departure Program moved around 6,000 Amerasians and 11,000 relatives to the United States.

== Enactment ==
On August 6, 1987, Rep. Robert J. Mrazek [D-NY-3] introduced the Amerasian Homecoming Bill (H.R. 3171). The bill was co-sponsored by 204 U.S. representatives (154 Democrats, 49 Republicans, and 1 Independent). In 1988, the U.S. Congress passed the Amerasian Homecoming Act (PL 100–200). The law took effect on March 21, 1988, and allowed Vietnamese Amerasians born January 1, 1962, through January 1, 1976, to apply for immigrant visas until March 21, 1990. Additionally the legislation removed immigration quotas and reduced legal barriers for Vietnamese Amerasians' immigration. As a result of the act around 20,000 Amerasian children left Vietnam. Prior to the Amerasian Homecoming Act, many Amerasian children faced prejudice in Vietnam sometimes referred to as bui doi ("the dust of life" or "trash"). However, after the act many of these children would be called "golden children" since not only could the Amerasian children move to the United States, but so could their families. The act allowed the spouse, child, mother, or the next of kin of the Amerasian child to emigrate. The act was significant, because it allowed applicants to establish a mixed race identity by appearance alone.

== Immigration process ==
The American Homecoming Act operated through the Orderly Departure Program in the respective U.S. embassies. U.S. Embassy officials would conduct interviews for Amerasians children and their families. The interviews were intended to prove whether or not the child's father was a U.S. military personnel. Under the American Homecoming Act, Vietnamese Amerasian children did not have to have documentation from their American fathers; however if they did, their case would be processed quicker. The approval rating for Amerasian applicants was approximately 95 percent.

The approved applicants and their families would go through a medical exam. The medical exam was less extensive than other immigration medical exams. If they passed, the U.S. would notify Vietnamese authorities and would process them for departure. The Amerasians would then be sent to the Philippines for a 6-month English language (ESL) and cultural orientation (CO) program. Once the Amerasians arrived in the United States they would be resettled by private voluntary agencies contracted with the U.S. State Department. Some Amerasians gave accounts that some "fake families" approached them as a way to immigrate to the United States. The U.S. Attorney General in conversation with the U.S. Secretary of State submitted program reports to the U.S. Congress every three years.

== Controversies ==
While the American Homecoming Act was the most successful measure by the United States to encourage Amerasian immigration, the act faced controversies. A primary issue was the act only applied to Amerasian children born in Vietnam. The American Homecoming Act excluded Japan, Korea, the Philippines, Laos, Cambodia, and Thailand. While Amerasian children from outside Vietnam could immigrate to the United States, they could do so only if their fathers claimed them. Most fathers did not recognize their children, especially if they were born to sex workers.

There were other concerns facing the American Homecoming Act by the Vietnamese immigrants. Some accounts include a Vietnamese woman who attempted to claim American citizenship for her Amerasian son, but the father denied the relationship and responsibility by calling her a prostitute. Since sex workers were largely excluded, many children were unable to participate in the program. In the 1970s, the U.S. cut refugee cash assistance and medical aid to only eight months. Many Amerasian children account for their struggles in public school and very few attended higher education. Amerasian children who stayed in their respective countries found difficulties. Many of the children faced prejudice since their fair skin or very dark skin, blue eyes, or curly black hair would quickly identify them as Amerasian. Additionally the children faced judgment from the new socialist Vietnamese officials and other neighbors since their features positioned them as reminders of the "old enemy."
