= GI Baby =

Japanese-Allied children during Occupation of Japan

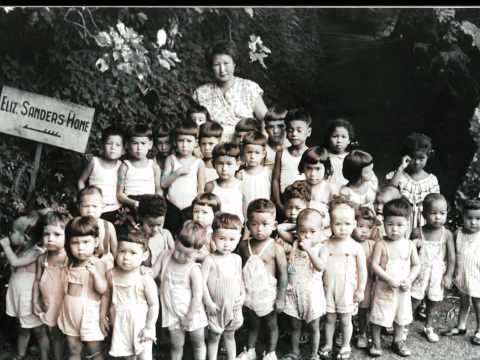
Children in Elizabeth Saunders Home

A GI Baby is a child born to a Japanese woman by a military servicemember of the Allied Occupation Forces of Japan.

GI Babies were typically orphans due to the difficulties raising such children, and were also called "mixed orphans". Because the British Federal Occupation Force had taken measures to prohibit dating with non-white women from the viewpoint of racism, the soldiers could not obtain permission to marry a Japanese woman. If it was discovered that a child was born in violation of this, the child was forcibly separated from the family. The ban was abolished in 1952, and hundreds of war brides went to Australia and Britain, but it was reported that in many cases, tragedy still occurred.

== Statistics ==
The Ministry of Health in Japan established Miki Kano on 13 August 1952, consisting of 20 experts Mixed-race child problem countermeasure study group (混血児問題対策研究会). According to the summary of the Kanagawa Prefectural Council of Social Welfare in 1952, there were 276 children of mixed-race in the facility in the prefecture, which was the majority of the mixed-race children in Japan at that time Child Welfare Facility.

According to a survey conducted by Ministry of Health and Welfare in 1953, there were 4972 GI babies in Japan. Meanwhile, at that time Elizabeth Saunders Home founder Miki Sawada announced the theory of 200,000 GI babies, but according to a survey by the Pearl S. Buck Foundation, the actual number is very high. Although it is difficult to grasp, it was said that there would actually be at least 20,000 to 30,000 GI babies in Japan at that time.

According to the Diet response to the question of Shinkichi Ukeda in 1959 Koun Takataa (then Director of the Children's Bureau of the Ministry of Health and Welfare), as of 1959, the Ministry of Health and Welfare has counted the number of mixed-race children in Japan.

== Later ==
In 2015, it was found that the description of the entrance to Negishi Foreign Cemetery, which mentioned GI Babies, was deleted and rewritten by the Yokohama City Hall managing the graveyard while locals protested. This information board was donated to Yokohama City by Yokohama Yamate Lions Club in 1988, and the text was prepared in consultation between Yamate Lions Club and Yokohama City, but in 2000 it was rewritten to "There are many things, such as babies buried after World War II, whose burial names are unknown". The explanation in Japanese has the same content. What was deleted was an English sentence that read, "Many children born between foreign military personnel and Japanese women after World War II are buried". The Yokohama City Environmental Facilities Division does not specify the reason for the rewrite.

== People who were born as GI baby ==
- Masao Kusakari (草刈正雄)
- Makoto Ayukawa (鮎川誠)
- Risa Akikawa (秋川リサ)
- Fujio Yamaguchi (山口冨士夫)
- Michi Aoyama (青山ミチ)
- Aki Izumi (泉アキ)
- Kacias Naito (カシアス内藤)
- Helen Nishikawa (西川ヘレン)
- Joe Yamanaka (ジョー山中)
- Linda Yamamoto (山本リンダ)
- Kairakutei Blakku II (快楽亭ブラック(2代目))
- Alice Jun (純アリス)
- Denny Tamaki (玉城デニー)
