= Elizabeth Saunders Home =

Location
- 1152 Oiso, Oiso-machi, Naka-gun, Kanagawa-ken; 255-0003; Japan
- Coordinates: 35°18′32″N 139°18′51.1″E

Information
- Type: Orphanage
- Established: February 1948
- Founder: Miki Sawada
- Affiliation: Anglican Church in Japan
- Website: www.elizabeth-sh.jp

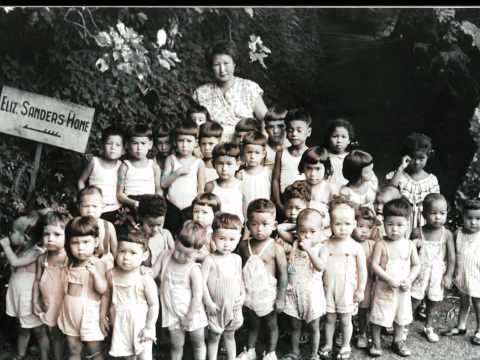
Miki Sawada with orphaned children at Elizabeth Saunders Home, circa 1950

Elizabeth Saunders Home (エリザベス・サンダースホーム) is a Christian orphanage located in the town of Oiso in Kanagawa Prefecture, Japan.

== History ==
Elizabeth Saunders Home is an orphanage in Japan established in 1948 by Miki Sawada, a Mitsubishi heiress, with the original intent of housing biracial children, typically those born between men of the occupying US Armed Forces and Japanese women, who were abandoned by their parents and ostracized by Japanese society immediately after World War II.

The orphanage was created on the former property of the Iwasaki, founder of Mitsubishi, see Yataro Iwasaki, family's detached residence located in Oiso, which had been confiscated by the Japanese government in lieu of property tax payment during World War II. Miki Sawada bought the land back for 4 million Yen that she managed to collect, in part by selling her personal property.

The name Elizabeth Saunders was adopted in honor of the first donor to the orphanage soon after reacquisition of the land, during which time Miki Sawada, having spent all her money, was struggling to run the orphanage. Elizabeth Saunders was an Englishwoman who had spent 40 years in Japan as a governess in the service of the Mitsui family both prior to World War II and throughout the war years. Prior to her death in Tokyo, in 1946 she asked that her charitable bequest be left to work under the auspices of the Anglican Church in Japan. Miki Sawada never met Saunders, receiving news of her donation through intermediary Lewis Bush and the Anglican bishops acting as executors to the charitable trust.

The groundbreaking ceremony for the home was held on 26 October 1947, attended by Allied Church Club benefactors and long-term supporters of the orphanage such as Paul Rusch. Elizabeth's charity enabled Miki Sawada to register her orphanage as a non-profit organization for the first time, and opened the door for future charitable connections.

According to Miki Sawada's autobiography, "黒い肌と白い心" (literally "Black Skin, White Soul"), while she was on a train in Gifu Prefecture of Japan in the earlier part of 1947, the dead body of a Black baby wrapped in layers of newspaper and cloth fell from an overhead compartment onto her lap. By this time Miki Sawada who was married to an ambassador of Japan had traveled extensively prior to World War II. During her travels she had volunteered at one of Dr. Barnardo's orphanages in England. According to her biography, this incident with the deceased baby was what ultimately made her decide to open Elizabeth Saunders Home.

In the book Trans-Pacific Racisms and the U.S. Occupation of Japan by Yukiko Koshiro, the author describes a post-war Japan that together with the US, smoothed over and attempted to make taboo the topic of racism that had been so prevalent, if not outright encouraged, against each other by both sides during the war. As described in Yukiko's book, Miki Sawada believed that racism directed at biracial babies set in this atmosphere, especially those shown toward babies with Black fathers, made it necessary for her to open Elizabeth Saunders Home and find a way to get them adopted back to their paternal country. Her actions and comments at the time were considered controversial, and vocalization of both criticism and approval resonated from both sides of the Pacific.

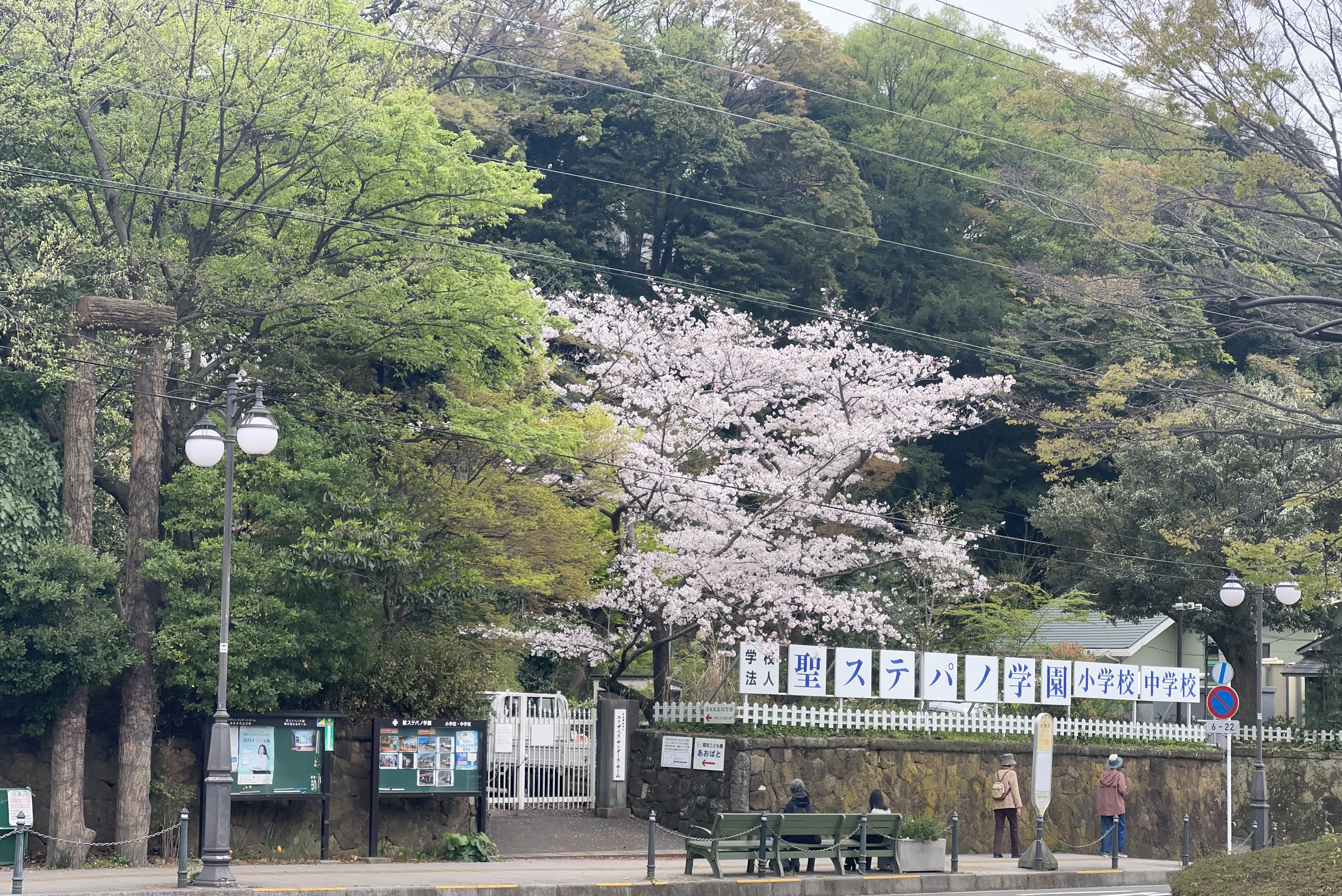
St. Stephan's School entrance, 2023

== St. Stephan's School ==
In 1953 Miki Sawada opened an elementary school for the children at Elizabeth Saunders Home to attend. It was named St. Stephan's School. Stephan was the Christian name of her third son, who died during a naval battle in Indonesia during World War II.

In 1959 she expanded the school to include a middle school. In 1993 the school started accepting students from the general public. St. Stephan's School is a member of the Association of Christian Schools in Japan, a Protestant organization.

== Reconstruction ==
During 2009, Elizabeth Saunders Home was rebuilt.

== Alumni ==
There is an Old Boys' club that was established and is run by the Alumni of Elizabeth Saunders Home. They also maintain a website.

== In media ==
A Japanese documentary was made in 2009 about Elizabeth Saunders Home featuring some of the former children that grew up there, titled "トンネルの向こうは僕らの楽園だった。" (Lit. "Beyond the Tunnel was our Paradise.") The title refers to the tunnel that one usually passed through in order to get to the home.

The documentary was hosted by Anna Tsuchiya, an actress and singer who herself grew up in Japan as a "hāfu", a Japanese euphemism for "biracial". The documentary followed some of the former orphans' lives after they left Elizabeth Saunders Home and went out into the world. It was first shown on-screen in 2009, then later broadcast on TV in 2010.
