= Orderly Departure Program =

Program to resettle Vietnamese refugees

The Orderly Departure Program (ODP) was a program to permit immigration of Vietnamese to the United States and to other countries. It was created in 1979 under the auspices of the United Nations High Commissioner for Refugees (UNHCR). The objective of the ODP was to provide a mechanism for Vietnamese to leave their homeland safely and in an orderly manner to be resettled abroad. Prior to the ODP, tens of thousands of "boat people" were fleeing Vietnam monthly by boat and turning up on the shores of neighboring countries. Under the ODP, from 1980 until 1997, 623,509 Vietnamese were resettled abroad of whom 458,367 went to the United States.

== Background ==
In June 1979, more than 54,000 Vietnamese refugees arrived by boat in neighboring Southeast Asian countries and Hong Kong. This culminated in several months in which the numbers of refugees making the dangerous passage in small boats from Vietnam had steadily grown. With new arrivals of Vietnamese piling up in squalid refugee camps, the countries of Southeast Asia united in declaring that they had "reached the limit of their endurance and decided that they would not accept any new arrivals."

In response, the UNHCR convened an international conference in Geneva, Switzerland, in July 1979, stating that "a grave crisis exists in Southeast Asia for hundreds of thousands of refugees." Illustrating the prominence of the issue, Vice President Walter Mondale headed the U.S. delegation. The results of the conference were that the Southeast Asian countries agreed to provide temporary asylum to the refugees, Vietnam agreed to promote orderly departures and prevent the exodus of boat people, and the Western countries agreed to accelerate resettlement. The Orderly Departure Program enabled Vietnamese, if approved, to depart Vietnam for resettlement in another country without having to leave their country and attempt the voyage by boat to a neighboring country.

== Objectives and results ==
As a result of the agreements at the Geneva conference, boat people leaving Vietnam declined to a few thousand per month and resettlements increased from 9,000 per month in early 1979 to 25,000 per month. The worst of the humanitarian crisis was over, although boat people would continue to leave Vietnam for more than another decade and die at sea or be confined to lengthy stays in refugee camps.

The objectives of the Orderly Departure Program were "family reunion and other humanitarian cases." France saw the ODP as primarily a refugee program, i.e., to resettle political refugees; Canada, Australia, and New Zealand saw it as a family reunification program; and the U.S. wished to secure departure from Vietnam for former U.S. employees and relatives of Vietnamese in the U.S.

Persons eligible for emigration out of Vietnam were determined by an exchange of lists between the government of Vietnam and the resettlement country. The Vietnamese list included persons the Vietnamese government had been approved for departure; the list of the resettlement country included those persons that country wished to accept. The first lists were exchanged by the U.S and Vietnam in late 1979. The US list consisted of 4,000 persons, mostly former employees of the U.S. and of Vietnamese with relatives in the United States. The Vietnamese list included 21,000 persons, the majority of them ethnic Chinese. There was very little overlap between the two lists, and it took nearly 18 months of negotiation managed by UNHCR to agree on 1,700 persons eligible for the ODP. Despite this slow start, however, the ODP slowly gained steam with the number of Vietnamese immigrants under ODP rising to several tens of thousands per year.

The Orderly Departure Program office of the U.S. was initially established in Bangkok, Thailand, in January 1980. On September 14, 1994, registration for the ODP was closed. In 1999, after normalization of diplomatic relations between the U.S. and Vietnam, the office in Bangkok was closed, and the remaining open cases were transferred to the Refugee Resettlement Section at the U.S. Consulate in Ho Chi Minh City, Vietnam.

Although registration for the ODP ended in 1994, in 2005 the United States and Vietnam signed an agreement which allows those Vietnamese to register for immigration who were not able to do so before ODP registration ended.

The following table identifies those countries accepting the greatest number of Vietnamese immigrants under the Orderly Departure Program. A few thousand additional Vietnamese were resettled after 1997. More than 40 countries participated in the program.

Country	Number of Vietnamese resettled under ODP program 1980-1997	Notes
United States	458,367	
Canada	60,285	
Australia	46,711	
France	19,264	
Germany	12,067	
United Kingdom	4,842	
Norway	3,998	
Belgium	3,106	
Sweden	3,079	
Denmark	2,298	
Other countries	9,492	
Grand Total	623,509	

Source: Robinson, W. Courtland Terms of Refuge, London: Zed Books, Ltd.: 1998, Appendix 2

== See also ==
- Vietnamese American
- Indochina refugee crisis
- Vietnamese boat people
