= List of Vietnamese American groups =

The follow is a list of groups formed by or for the Vietnamese-American community.

== Military ==
- Vietnamese American Armed Forces Association

== Academic ==
- Union of North American Vietnamese Student Associations
- Union of Vietnamese Student Associations of Southern California

== Civic and political ==
- Boat People SOS
- East Meets West
- Radio Free Vietnam
- Vietnamese Alliance to Combat Trafficking

== Gangs ==
- Born to Kill
- Viet Boyz
- Dragon Family
- sT's BoYz

One of the most powerful of all the Asian gangs in California and Los Angeles taking over all Wah Chings extortion racquets in Chinatown.

== See also ==
- Boat People
- Vietnamese American
- Overseas Vietnamese
