= Radio Free =

The term "Radio Free" is prefixed to several radio stations which were set up by United States Central Intelligence Agency to deliver news to countries strategically important to the foreign relations of the United States. The official stations are:

- Radio Free Afghanistan
- Radio Free Asia
- Radio Free Europe
- Radio Free Iraq
- Radio Free Syria

The term is also applied to other local radio and internet radio stations, such as:

- Free Radio San Diego
- Radio Free Brighton
- Radio Free Brooklyn
- Radio Free Chosun
- Radio Free Dixie
- Radio Free Georgia
- Radio Free Hawaii
- Radio Free Hub City
- Radio Free Nashville
- Radio Free Queen City
- Radio Free Redoubt
- Radio Free Santa Fe
- Radio Free Taos
- Radio Free Scotland
- Radio Free Vietnam
- Radio Free Virgin

The term has also been applied to subjects that are not radio shows:

- Radio Free America
- Radio Free Albemuth
- Radio Free Roscoe - a teen comedy-drama sitcom, which has a fictional radio show of the same name
- Radio Free Vestibule
- Radio Free Zion
- Radio Free Wasteland is a moniker occasionally used for Galaxy News Radio by its DJ, Three Dog. Galaxy News Radio is one of the two major radio stations in the video game Fallout 3.
- Radio Free Kyrat, one of the two radio stations in the video game Far Cry 4.
- "Radio Free Zerg," a secret music track in the computer game StarCraft: Brood War.
