= VNPF =

VNPF may refer to:

- Vanuatu National Provident Fund
- Vietnamese Nôm Preservation Foundation
