= Boat People SOS =

US nonprofit organization

Boat People SOS (BPSOS) is a 501(c)(3) nonprofit organization devoted to Vietnamese-American civic and political activism. It is headquartered in Falls Church, Virginia. BPSOS' mission is to "empower, organize, and equip Vietnamese individuals and communities in their pursuit of liberty and dignity.” BPSOS claims that one in 10 Vietnamese Americans has received assistance from BPSOS while still in Vietnam, on the high seas, in a refugee camp, or after arriving in the United States. Through their 17 office locations in the U.S. and two office locations in Southeast Asia, they provide a web of services to support individuals, families, and communities.

BPSOS has experienced significant growth and positive media, especially with Pamela Constable's article in The Washington Post on 2008 October 21. However, BPSOS and its CEO and President, Dr Thang Nguyen, have also been involved in controversies. In 2024, BPSOS and Dr Thang Nguyen were ordered to pay US$500,000 for defamation, plus US$20,000 and 2,000, respectively, for malice against Professor Khoa Le. Dr Thang Nguyen stated in court that he was penniless. In 2019, BPSOS and Dr Thang Nguyen were ordered to pay US$170,000 for defamation against Holly Ngo, a former BPSOS financial contributor. They, in turn, won US$5,000 and 500 in cross-litigation against her.

On 2008 December 6, BPSOS volunteer and former (1996–2002) board member Anh "Joseph" Cao became the first Vietnamese-American to be elected to Congress.

== History ==
=== Origin ===
Founded in San Diego and Songkla Camp, Thailand as Boat People S.O.S. Committee, in their early days they conducted voluntary rescue-at-sea missions, rescuing over 3,000 boat people. Later in response to pirate attacks against Vietnamese boat people in the waters of Thailand and Malaysia, they collaborated with the Thai Royal Navy to fight pirates and bring refugees to safety.

=== Early development ===
Under the Vietnamese communists, people sought ways to escape but were not welcome anywhere. According to the report of United Nations High Commissioner For Refugees, 1/3 of Vietnamese boat people died at sea by killing, storms, illness and food shortage. A total of approximately 250,000 men, women, and children of all ages. Boats were being pushed back out to the seas, and those few survivors who reached shores were put into detention centers.

In response to major shifts in US and international policies toward the Vietnamese boat people, they moved their headquarters to Northern Virginia to concentrate on advocacy. Rising to the new challenge of saving the last boat people, BPSOS sent lawyers to asylum countries through its Legal Assistance for Vietnamese Asylum Seekers (LAVAS) project and successfully advocated for policy changes, which resulted in resettlement of 18,000 former boat people after repatriation.

=== Present status ===
When most boat people were either repatriated or resettled, they shifted their focus to domestic programs for Vietnamese refugees and immigrants in communities all across America. In 2005 and the years that followed, the Katrina Aid Today (KAT) recovery program was a catalyst for their work in the Vietnamese-American communities of the Gulf Coast. As a direct result of working with KAT, a national consortium of organizations under the guidance of the United Methodist Committee on Relief, they founded branches in Bayou La Batre, New Orleans, and Biloxi. Many of the tens of thousands of Vietnamese Americans living in those areas were poor even before Katrina struck. Working as case managers through KAT, they boosted many families from misery to self-sufficiency through programs to rebuild everything from homes and bank accounts to social networks. In the course of more than two years following Katrina, the BPSOS KAT teams assisted close to 4,000 families, securing them $16.5 million in assistance, placing 850 into homes, and referring 265 to jobs; built capacity for 12 faith-based and community organizations to serve hurricane victims, including raising over $200,000 to support their activities; and established a system to disseminate news and information directly to some 5,000 Vietnamese households via the press, radio, and television.

On 14 February 2025, Vietnamese Ministry of Public Security (MPS) designated BPSOS as a "terrorist organization" (Vietnamese: Tổ chức khủng bố, lit. 'Terrorist-related organization'). The ministry stated that its reason is because the organization "operates under the guise of ‘refugee relief’ but in fact, it uses this activity to connect with and assist organisations and individuals in carrying out anti-Vietnam activities".

== International initiatives ==
=== CAMSA ===
==== Origin ====
In February 2008, responding to an alarming level of human trafficking in Southeast Asia, BPSOS, in partnership with the International Society for Human Rights, the Vietnamese Canadian Federation, and the U.S. Committee to Protect Vietnamese Workers, launched The Coalition to Abolish Modern-day Slavery in Asia (CAMSA) project. BPSOS is addressing the global explosion of human trafficking, especially in the realm of labor exports. Slashed wages, grueling working hours, ill-treatment, and deception are all everyday challenges faced by a new generation of Vietnamese working overseas.

==== Mission ====
CAMSA's mission is to rescue and protect trafficking victims, punish traffickers through economic and legal measures, and pressure the governments of the source and destination countries to enact and enforce anti-trafficking laws and policies. CAMSA's anti-human trafficking campaign has three focuses:

- Rescue and protect victims;
- Punish traffickers through economic and legal means; and
- Pressure the governments of the source and destination countries to enact and enforce anti-trafficking laws and policies.

CAMSA collaborates with other organizations to open offices in countries with a significant Vietnamese population. The purpose of these offices is to develop resources locally, and to help Vietnamese in danger of being a victim of human trafficking. In April 2008, the first CAMSA office was opened in Penang, Malaysia. So far this office has handled 30 cases of varying sizes, assisting some 3,000 guest workers. BPSOS is currently spearheading fundraising efforts to open other CAMSA offices in the region. Each individual office will have the capacity to help thousands of victims of exploitation or trafficking.

==== Activity ====
BPSOS first became involved in the issue of human trafficking through the Daewoosa Case. In 1999, over 200 Vietnamese and Chinese workers were tricked into paying thousands of dollars each in order to travel to work in a sewing factory on the island of American Samoa. Each worker was promised $408 per month for wages, plus free food and housing. However, once there, the workers were beaten, confined to the factory, barely fed, and forced to live in filthy conditions while the employer kept their travel documents. They worked hard to bring media and government attention to this case of human trafficking. After the US government prosecuted Daewoosa, BPSOS along with other service providers came to the aid of the victims. Daewoosa survivors are now legally in the US and are being helped to receive the benefits of immigration relief, health care, education, and employment assistance by our Victims of Exploitation and Trafficking Assistance (VETA) program.

In February 2008, BPSOS aided over 170 young women employed by W&D Apparel, a Taiwanese firm operating in Jordan. In response to being cheated out of wages and forced to work 16-hour days, the workers went on strike for several weeks. Despite the use of brutal force by factory guards and the police to break the strike, they persevered. Since then, international pressure from BPSOS, the State Department, and members of the US Congress has helped them return home, as they wished, with a measure of dignity.

As a founding member of the Coalition to Abolish Modern-day Slavery in Asia (CAMSA), BPSOS has since worked with Esquel Malaysia to successfully resolve disputes over wages and working conditions at that firm. The latest firm to receive the focus of CAMSA's concerns is Polar Twin Advance, a high-tech firm in Penang. That case was resolved with financial assistance to the workers concerned, and their safe return home. As of Winter 2008, CAMSA has intervened in several cases, positively affecting a total of nearly 3,000 Vietnamese guest workers.

==== Allegations against BPSOS and Nguyễn Đình Thắng regarding links to terrorism in Vietnam ====
Nguyễn Đình Thắng, born in 1958 and holding U.S. citizenship, has been identified by Vietnam’s Ministry of Public Security as the executive director and leader of the organization “Boat People SOS” (BPSOS). While BPSOS was originally founded under humanitarian aims to assist refugees and monitor human rights conditions in Vietnam such as labor rights, religious freedom, freedom of the press, and prison conditions; the Vietnamese government asserts that the organization has been involved in activities threatening national security, including alleged ties to a recent terrorist attack.

According to official statements released on February 14, 2025, the Ministry of Public Security of Vietnam stated that BPSOS is closely connected with the organization “Montagnards for Justice” (MSFJ), which was held responsible for a terrorist attack on June 11, 2023, in Ea Ktur commune, Cư Kuin district, Đắk Lắk province, resulting in 9 deaths, several injuries, and significant property damage.

Authorities claim that Nguyễn Đình Thắng and BPSOS provided financial, logistical, and organizational support to MSFJ, including assisting its members such as Y Quynh Bdap, Y Phik Hdok, and others in establishing the group in Thailand in July 2019, and later supporting its registration as a legal entity in Virginia, USA, in April 2023.

Even after MSFJ was designated as a terrorist organization by the Vietnamese government on March 6, 2024, BPSOS allegedly continued to provide support—including housing, financial aid, and legal defense—for MSFJ members, notably assisting Y Quynh Bdap during his arrest and trial in Thailand. The Vietnamese government further asserts that BPSOS launched advocacy campaigns aimed at preventing Bdap’s extradition to Vietnam and mobilized legal funds to influence judicial proceedings abroad.

Based on these allegations and in accordance with Decree 93/2024/NĐ‑CP and relevant United Nations Security Council resolutions, Vietnam’s Ministry of Public Security officially classified BPSOS as an organization associated with terrorism. The Ministry stated that “while operating under the guise of refugee assistance, BPSOS in reality has exploited humanitarian platforms to support individuals and groups engaging in activities aimed at undermining the State of Vietnam.”

=== Defending refugee rights ===
As a continuation of their work under Legal Assistance for Vietnamese Asylum Seekers (LAVAS) in the 1990s, BPSOS continues to defend Vietnamese victims of persecution including those still in Vietnam and hundreds of Vietnamese who successfully fled to neighboring countries. BPSOS collaborates with legal aid and human rights organizations, UN agencies, and US and other embassies in Southeast Asia to promote refugee protection policies, provide legal assistance to victims, and advocate for expeditious resettlement. High-profile cases successfully assisted by BPSOS include Pastor Nguyen Lap Ma, Pastor Nguyen Nhat Thong, Ven. Tim Sakhorn (Buddhist monk) and numerous dissidents.

=== Monitoring Vietnam's country conditions ===
BPSOS works with many human rights organizations to monitor the developments in Vietnam in different human rights areas, including labor rights, religious freedom, freedom of association, freedom of the press, prison conditions, etc. BPSOS works with International Human Rights Society to maintain the list of dissidents arrested since August 2007, when the ongoing massive government crackdown started. Information collected is published in the annual Vietnam Country Report, which is distributed to members of Congress, relevant Administration agencies, and human rights organizations. BPSOS frequently participates in Congressional hearings on Vietnam and prepares briefs for US officials on issues relating to Vietnam.

== See also ==
- Vietnamese boat people
