= Union of North American Vietnamese Student Associations =

The Union of North American Vietnamese Student Associations (UNAVSA) (Vietnamese: Liên Hội Sinh Viên Việt Nam Bắc Mỹ Châu) is a 501(c)(3) non-profit, community-based organization founded in 2004 as a means for Vietnamese organizations from across North America to network, share common resources, collaborate with one another to build strong sustainable communities, and engage in philanthropic work.

The elected executive board consists of a President, Internal Vice President, External Vice President, Treasurer, and Secretary. Executive Board terms last two years. There are two other main staffing departments that are one-year roles: Cabinet and Conference. The Cabinet general committees include Alumni Relations, Civic Engagement, Information Technology, Marketing and Public Relations, Sponsorship and Development, VSAcademy, Community Safety, and Collective Philanthropy Project.

== History ==
During the Third International Vietnamese Youth Conference in 2003 in San Diego, there were initial talks for creating a network of Vietnamese Student Associations in North America modeled after the Federal Vietnamese Students Association of Australia. Through a collaboration of the Union of Vietnamese Student Associations of Southern California along with the New England Intercollegiate Vietnamese Student Association, the first North American Vietnamese Student Associations (NAVSA) conference was held in the Summer of 2004 in Boston, and with that NAVSA was born. Only with the second conference in 2005 in Chicago, was the name of NAVSA changed to The Union of North American Vietnamese Student Associations (UNAVSA) to better reflect that nature of this organization as a union.

== Regional Partners ==
- Union of Vietnamese Student Associations of Northern California
- Union of Vietnamese Student Associations of Southern California
- Northwest Vietnamese Student Association
- Southwest Union of Vietnamese Student Associations
- Union of Vietnamese Student Associations of the South
- Union of Vietnamese Student Associations of the Gulf Coast
- Union of Vietnamese Student Associations of the Southeast
- Mid-Atlantic Union of Vietnamese Student Associations
- Union of Vietnamese Student Associations of the Midwest
- New England Intercollegiate Vietnamese Student Associations
- Northeast Union of Vietnamese Student Associations
- United Vietnamese Student Associations of Eastern Canada
- Western Canada Union of Vietnamese Student Associations

== Conferences ==
The UNAVSA conference attracts hundreds of undergraduates, graduates, and young professionals from around the country participate in the multi-day event to hone their leadership skills, hold discussions with distinguished speakers, and explore issues in the Vietnamese community domestically and abroad. The majority of attendees are current and future officers of Vietnamese American student groups (VSAs, VSUs, UVSAs, etc.) seeking to develop personal leadership abilities, build organizational management skills and network with other leaders from around the country.

Conference	Location	Theme	Date
NAVSA	Boston, MA	NAVSA (Self-Titled)	July 2–4, 2004
uNAVSA-2	Chicago, IL	Acting in Unity: Making Hope a Reality	July 2005
uNAVSA-3	San Jose, CA	In Common Unity, Building Local Power	July 13–16, 2006
uNAVSA-4	New Orleans, LA	Recognize, Inspire, Strengthen, Empower (RISE)	July 26–29, 2007
uNAVSA-5	Portland, OR	Sharing Our Past, Shaping Our Future	July 31-August 3, 2008
uNAVSA-6	Atlanta, GA	Pursue Your Passion, Define Your Path	July 30-August 2, 2009
uNAVSA-7	Washington DC	Uncommon Power for the Common Voice	July 29-August 1, 2010
UNAVSA-8	Denver, CO	Blueprint of our Legacy	July 28–31, 2011
UNAVSA-9	Minneapolis, MN	Bước Qua (Step Through)	July 26–29, 2012
UNAVSA-10	Anaheim, CA	Nơi Nương Tựa (Safe Haven)	August 1–4, 2013
UNAVSA-11	Dallas, TX	Together, Let's Fly	July 24–27, 2014
UNAVSA-12	Seattle, WA	Momentum: Ripples of Progress	June 26–29, 2015
UNAVSA-13	Boston, MA	Light the Way	July 21–24, 2016
UNAVSA-14	New Orleans, LA	Unlock the Present	July 20–24, 2017
UNAVSA-15	Atlanta, GA	Stand up, Stand Out!	August 2–5, 2018
UNAVSA-16	Vancouver, BC	Beyond the Horizon: Y[ours] to Discover	July 25–28, 2019
VE-1	Virtual	Connecting with U(s)	July 23–26, 2020
VE-2	Virtual	Behind the Dreams	July 22–25, 2021
UNAVSA-17	Portland, OR	Illuminate	July 21–24, 2022
UNAVSA-18	Houston, TX	Snapshots	July 13–16, 2023
UNAVSA-19	New York City, NY	Once In A Lifetime	July 11-14, 2024
UNAVSA-20	Chicago, IL	Visions	July 10-13, 2025
UNAVSA-21	San Jose, CA	Unwritten	July 9-12, 2026

== Collective Philanthropy Project ==
The CPP is an initiative created in 2004 for Vietnamese-American students and community organizations to collaborate toward a common charitable cause. The CPP's goal is to further UNAVSA's mission of developing leadership, preserving the Vietnamese heritage, and creating a unified national effort to help those in need. Each year, the top three candidates are asked to present their projects at the UNAVSA national conference. After the attendees vote, a beneficiary is announced at the conference banquet. In years past, CPP has partnered with several non-profit organizations, raising over $300,000 in the last seven years.

Year	List of CPP Beneficiaries
2025	Vietnam Health Clinic
2024	Rock Paper Scissors
2023	Rock Paper Scissors
2022	One Body Village
2021	Asian Prisoner Support Committee
2020	Messengers of Love
2019	Messengers of Love
2018	Children of Vietnam
2017	Pacific Links Foundation
2016	Catalyst Foundation
2015	Kids Without Borders
2014	Foodaid.Compassion
2013	One Body Village
2012	M.E.M.O.
2011	Children of Vietnam
2010	Blue Dragon Children's Foundation
2009	Vietnamese American Heritage Foundation
2008	VIETHOPE
2007	Vietnamese Overseas Initiative (VOICE)
2006	Catalyst Foundation
2005	VietACT

== Presidents ==
The UNAVSA executive board is headed by the President. The current President is David Tran, who took over from Matthew Nguyen in 2026 and will conclude his term at the UNAVSA Conference in 2028. The President is responsible for the strategic direction of UNAVSA and is tasked with ensuring the organization is operating within the scope defined by its partner organizations.

List of UNAVSA Presidents
No.	Name	Region of origin	Took office	Left office	Note
1	Quoc Phan	Southern California	4 July 2004	31 July 2005	
2	Tony Ngo	Southern California	31 July 2005	16 July 2006	
3	Hai Ton	Northern California	16 July 2006	3 August 2008	First two-year President
4	Brian Vo	Mid-Atlantic	3 August 2008	1 August 2010	
5	Dan Huynh	Midwest	1 August 2010	29 July 2012	
6	Lan Anh Nguyen	Mid-Atlantic	29 July 2012	27 July 2014	First female President
7	My-Phuong Ly	Midwest	27 July 2014	24 July 2016	
8	Thoa Kim Nguyen	Southwest	24 July 2016	5 August 2018	
9	Phuc Hong Phan	Southeast	5 August 2018	2020	
10	Philip Nguyen	Northern California	2020	2022	
11	Kelly Tran	Western Canada	2022	2024	First Canadian President
12	Matthew Nguyen	South	2024	2026	
13	David Tran	Midwest	2026	Present	

== See also ==
- List of Vietnamese American Groups
- Union of Vietnamese Student Associations of Southern California
- Vietnamese Student Association
- International Vietnamese Youth Conference
