= Radio Free America =

Radio Free America may refer to:

- The religious pirate radio station operated by Carl McIntire in 1973; see also Pirate radio in North America#Stations from international waters
- A former name of Dave Emory's talk radio show
- A right-wing political radio show hosted by Tom Valentine in the late 1980s and 1990s, heard originally on the Sun Radio Network but later only on shortwave-station WWCR.
- A fictional radio station featured in the 1984 film Red Dawn and its remake
- A fictional radio station mentioned in The Handmaid's Tale
- A free on-line platform for college radio and community radio
- Radio Free America (album), 2018 album by Richie Sambora and Orianthi

== See also ==
- Radio Free Europe
