= Union of Vietnamese Student Associations of Southern California =

American nonprofit organization

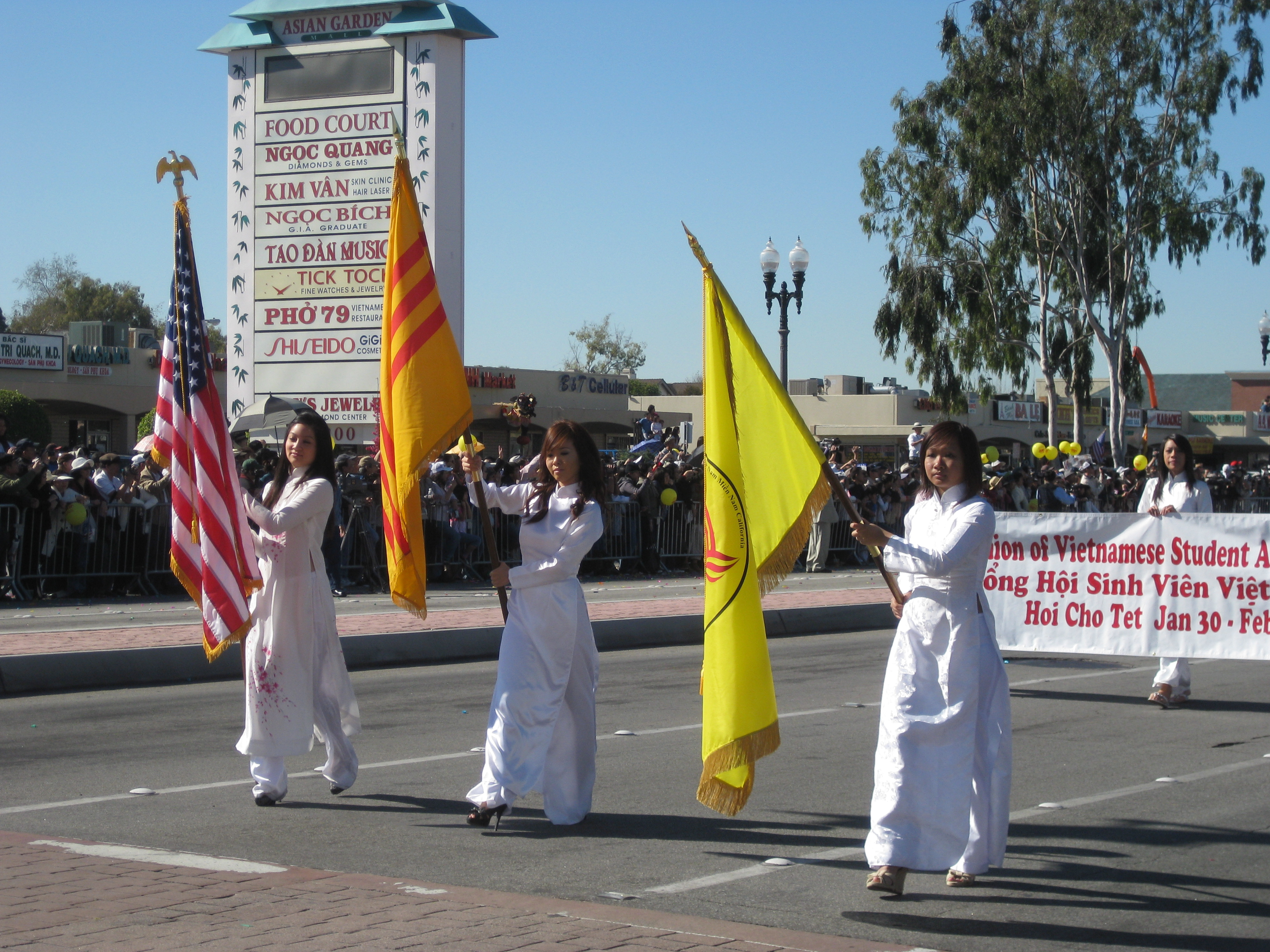
Union of Vietnamese Student Associations of Southern California parading at a Tet parade 2009

The Union of the Vietnamese Student Associations of Southern California (Vietnamese:Tổng Hội Sinh Viên Việt Nam Nam Cali, often abbreviated as UVSA) is a 501(c)(3) non-profit, non-partisan, community-based and youth-oriented organization designed to provide a united voice for Vietnamese American youth. While based in Little Saigon, organization is a cumulative organization of Vietnamese Student Associations at various Southern California universities and colleges. Its programs include the promotion and retention of Vietnamese language and culture among the Vietnamese youth community, especially through the inter-school support of the Vietnamese Culture Shows, fostering social networking among the different VSAs and participation in the philanthropic work of the Vietnamese community.

== History ==
UVSA was founded in 1982 as a means for youth to organize socially and politically within the community. Committed to cultural awareness, educating peers, and community service, UVSA is composed of volunteers including alumni, young professionals, educators, and college and high school students.

== Organization structure ==
=== Executive board ===
There are typically five executive board members who address the concerns of its members as well as the community. The five positions are President, External Vice, Internal Vice President, Secretary and Treasurer. The role of the executive board operates with appointed staff who fill the Director and Coordinators roles, whom each operate their own staff or project. Such projects include Project LEAD and Tet Festival.

==== Current executive board ====
The following are the current executive board members of UVSA.

President - Sarah Ho (2017-2019)

Treasurer - Nemo Hababag (2017-2019)

Secretary - Julie T. Nguyen (Temporary)

=== Inter-Collegiate Council ===
The ICC is responsible for the planning of inter-collegiate activities and providing member schools with opportunities to network with students from other campuses.

=== Staff ===
Staff is shortened to refer to anyone involved in UVSA who is a director, coordinator, team lead, or member of a respective project. Even though UVSA gains most recognition and public notice because of UVSA Tet Festival, the festival itself is only one project underneath UVSA.

== Project LEAD ==
Project LEAD (Leadership Education and Development) is one of many UVSA projects programs. Project LEAD was founded as part of UVSA in 1990 as a general Vietnamese summer culture camp, Trại Hè Về Với Non Sông brought together youth from across Southern California to enjoy a weekend of fun and excitement. As of today, Project LEAD houses multiple project programs, such as The UVSA/VAHSA Camp, Anh Chi Em, and Summit.

=== Project LEAD programs ===
==== Camp ====
This camp focuses on the importance of community cohesion and unity; provides an opportunity for students to network with each other and establish skills that reinforce mutual collaboration; and instills an appreciation for the Vietnamese American identity, cultural heritage and a sense of belonging.

In 2001, these leaders transitioned away from an open camp to UVSA Camp which specifically targeted collegiate VSA leaders. In 2003, UVSA Mike Vu and Vu Dinh wanted to take what they had been learning at prior UVSA Camps and expand on camp programming to give back to our younger brothers and sisters in high school. They founded Project LEAD which would be the umbrella project to UVSA Camp and then newly introduced VAHSA Camp (no longer exists).

==== Anh Chi Em (ACE) ====
The Anh Chi Em (ACE) is a mentorship program that was established in 2010 to provide High School students guidance and support as well as having a role model in their life. We also encourage higher education and development in leadership, social, and intellectual skills.

==== Summit ====
Held on September 24, 2016, at California State University, Fullerton. UVSA Summit is a one-day event to develop technical and professional skills specific to leadership officer positions. With this year's theme, "Pride and Legacy," the aim was to inspire officers within UVSA to be proud of their dedication and commitment to their respective communities and leave a lasting legacy for generations to come.

== Tet Festival ==
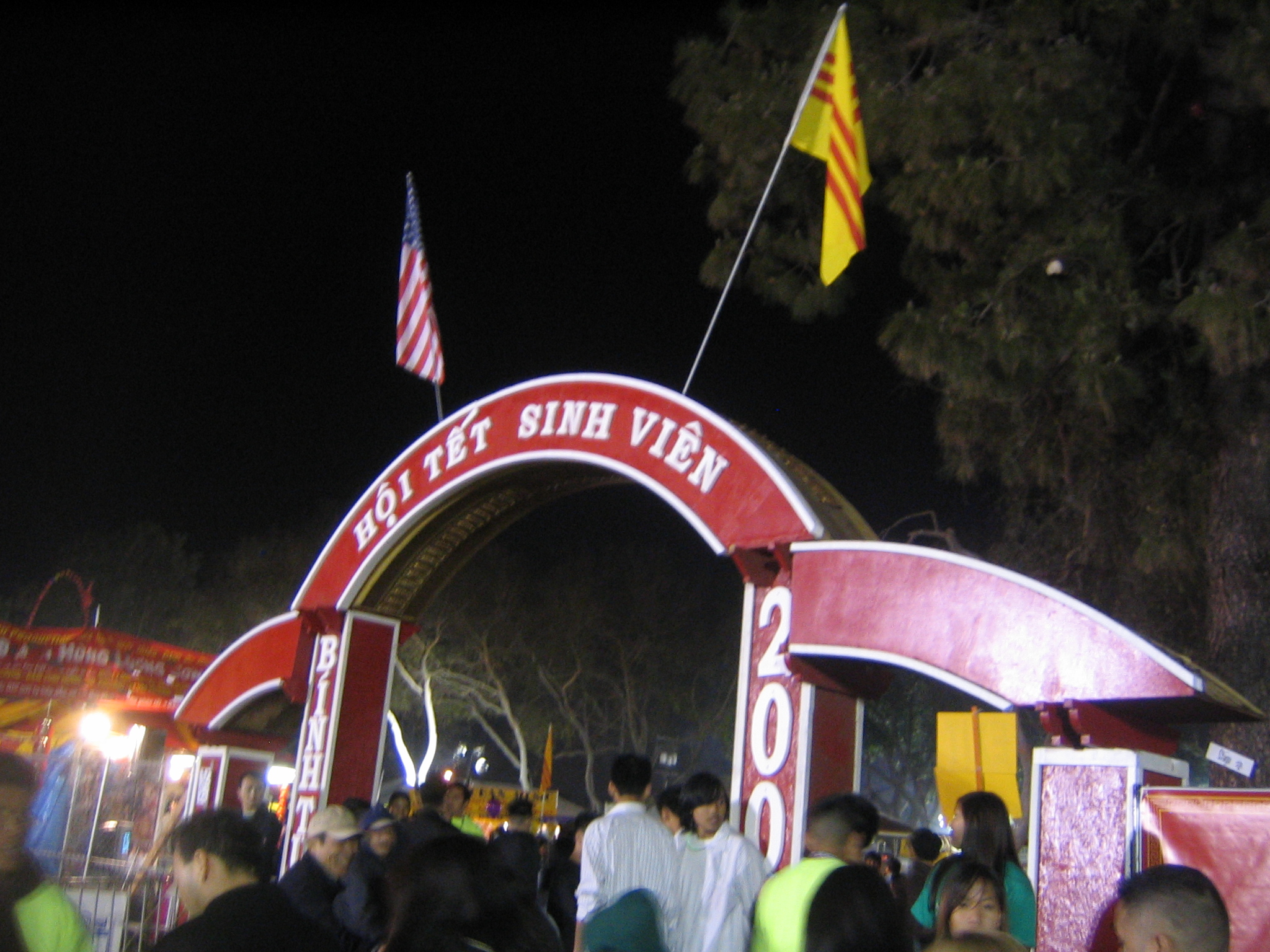
UVSA's Tet Festival in Little Saigon, Orange County, California 2006

UVSA's Tet Festival is organized each year to celebrate the Vietnamese Lunar New Year. The festival usually includes many cultural booths, carnival rides, a replica of a Vietnamese village and three days of entertainment programs ranging from famous Vietnamese celebrities, martial arts performances to pageant shows and contests. Throughout the years, the festival has taken place in various cities. From the year 2000 to 2013, the festival had resided in Garden Grove Park in the city of Garden Grove, CA . In 2014, the festival moved to its new home at the OC Fair & Event Center in the city of Costa Mesa, CA.

=== Miss Vietnam of Southern California ===
As part of the UVSA Tet Festival, the female beauty pageant, known as Miss Vietnam of Southern California (MVSC) is also hosted and held at UVSA Tet Festival. The current winner, or Queen, is Ashley Hoang

== Public stances ==
As UVSA is a 501(c)(3) organization, it can not have any political affiliation. However, certain stances and statements can be addressed.

=== California Resolution SCR 89 ===
This measure would designate the Beach Boulevard Interchange on
State Highway Route 22 in the County of Orange as the Nguyen Ngoc Phu
Human Rights Memorial Interchange. The measure would request the
Department of Transportation to determine the cost of appropriate
signs showing this designation and, upon receiving donations from
nonstate sources covering that cost, to erect those signs.[4]

== Non-profit ==
Each year, UVSA allocates a portion of the UVSA Tet Festival net profits to the Tet Community Assistance Fund. The festival would not be possible without the support of the community and as such, UVSA wishes to ensure the continued growth and support of the community by offering grants to organizations across Southern California. UVSA carefully reviews over one hundred proposals each year from Southern California non-profit organizations that address the needs of the community. Grants are awarded up to $5,000. Over the past 14 years, UVSA has awarded over $1.25 million to community organizations.

== See also ==
- Vietnamese Student Association
- International Vietnamese Youth Conference
