= Vietnamese Alliance to Combat Trafficking =

The Vietnamese Alliance to Combat Trafficking (VietACT) is a Vietnamese non-profit, grassroots organization founded in 2004 dedicated to eradicating human trafficking of Vietnamese victims through collaboration, advocacy, and education.

== History ==
In March 2004, a Taiwanese man put three young Vietnamese women on EBay Taiwan for sale as wives, "shipped only to Taiwan" for the price of $5,400. In response to this, Father Peter Nguyen Van Hung in conjunction with other Vietnamese priests in Taiwan have founded the Vietnamese Migrant Workers and Brides Office (also known as VMWBO or TaiwanACT) in early 2004 in Taiwan to better serve and assist the Vietnamese workers and brides in distress.

When the issue of human trafficking of Vietnamese women and children gained greater international attention and grassroots momentum, a group of students, young professionals, and community activists came together to form the Vietnamese Alliance to Combat Trafficking also known as VietACT.

== Not for Sale campaign ==
The Not for sale campaign led by VietACT in 2005 was intended to create billboard ads about the growing of human trafficking. A series of photographs and billboard posters were created and released by VietACT but never made it as a billboard ad.

However, the Not for Sale pictures were featured in the 2006 State Department Trafficking in Persons Report.

== Relay Against Trafficking ==
The Relay Against Trafficking was a campaign led by VietACT in 2006 to across North America to educate the general public about human trafficking, particularly the exploitation of Vietnamese men and women who endure slave labor and sexual abuse. The relay consisted of walkathons, press conferences, fundraising dinners in various cities and regions including Minnesota, Austin, Atlanta, Northern California, Southern California and Boston.
