= Vietnamese American Armed Forces Association =

The Vietnamese-American Uniformed Services Association, formerly the Vietnamese American Armed Forces Association (abbreviated: VAAFA), (Vietnamese: Hội Quân Nhân Người Mỹ Gốc Việt), is a non-profit, non partisan professional military association.

It is the first military association for Vietnamese American service members in the United States. Its members are Active, Reserve, National Guard, and Veterans of the U.S Armed Forces; Enlisted and Commissioned Officers from the five branches of the U.S. Military; U.S. Army, U.S. Marine Corps, U.S. Navy, U.S. Air Force, and U.S. Coast Guard and the two noncombatant uniformed services the National Oceanic and Atmospheric Administration Commissioned Corps (NOAAC) and the United States Public Health Service Commissioned Corps (PHSCC).

== History ==
In 2007, Lieutenant Commander Christopher V. Phan of the Judge Advocate General's Corps was deployed with the U.S. Navy SEAL to Iraq. While he and several other SEALs were trying to arrange a flight out of Baghdad, he overheard Lieutenant Colonel Tho V. Nguyen, U.S. Army, at the reservation counter. They struck up a conversation on the air field and committed to staying in touch. They afterwards remained friends after their deployment. Knowing the loneliness of serving overseas and being separated from their families, they decided to create an association to help Vietnamese American service members and their families cope with the separation. On August 23, 2008, Phan and LTC Nguyen, along with Sergeant Thao Bui, U.S. Army, Captain Triet Bui, U.S. Army, and Captain Hien Vu, U.S. Air Force, met at Bui's home and began drafting the by-laws and article of association for the Vietnamese American Armed Forces Association (VAAFA). VAAFA received official recognition from the State of California on September 15, 2008, and the association held its installation banquet on May 31, 2009.

On October 1, 2014, the Vietnamese-American Armed Forces Association was renamed the Vietnamese-American Uniformed Services Association, with a new website. The change incorporated more services: U.S. Public Health Service Commissioned Corps (USPHSCC) and National Oceanic and Atmospheric Administration Commissioned Corps (NOAACC). The U.S. Space Force (USSF) was added in 2019.

== Mission ==
VAAFA's stated mission is to provide professional development, mentorship, enhanced camaraderie, and networking for current and former Vietnamese American service members of the seven uniformed services. Through fund raising events and activities, the association raises money to provide care packages for deployed service members as well as provide financial assistances to families; in order for a member travel to the location of care in the event a military service member is wounded in the line of duty. VAAFA, also seeks to raise awareness of the contribution and sacrifices of Vietnamese American in the U.S. Armed Forces through active engagement of the Vietnamese Community through participation in community events and activities. As a military association, it does not endorse any political groups or activities. In 2010, VAAFA established the Fallen Heroes Scholarship, for 12 U.S. Citizen or Permanent Resident Vietnamese American students currently enrolled in college or high school seniors. The Fallen Heroes Scholarship was established in memory of Vietnamese American military service members who have died in defense of the United States of America.

== Past events ==
The organization holds periodic events. In 2009, this included the Vietnamese American Memorial in Orange County, California, and its First Bi-Annual Conference in Coronado, California. Other California events in 2009 included its First Annual Care Package Donation Drive, the A Gift From The Heart Donation Drive, the Alta Gardens Care Center Thanksgiving Day Visit, and a Toy Distribution in December. Some events in 2010 included the Alta Gardens Care Center Tet Visit, and the Fallen Heroes Scholarship Fundraiser Banquet, both in Orange County.

== Fallen Vietnamese American Service Members ==
TSGT Thanh V. Nguyen, USAF, June 25, 1996, Saudi Arabia
LCPL Alan D. Lam, USMC, April 22, 2003, Iraq
LCPL Andrew S. Dang, USMC, May 22, 2004, Iraq
SPC Binh Q. Tran, USA, November 7, 2004, Iraq
LCPL Victor Ronald H. Lu, USMC, November 13, 2004, Iraq
CPL Binh N. Le, USMC, December 3, 2004, Iraq
SFC Tung M. Nguyen, USA, November 14, 2006, Iraq
SSGT Du H. Tran, USA, June 20, 2008, Iraq
PFC Tan Q. Ngo, USA, August 27, 2008, Afghanistan
SGT Long N. Nguyen, USA, February 10, 2007, Afghanistan
SPC Dan H. Nguyen, USA, May 8, 2007, Iraq
CPL Tevan L. Nguyen, USMC, December 28, 2010, Afghanistan
