= John Balaban (poet) =

American writer

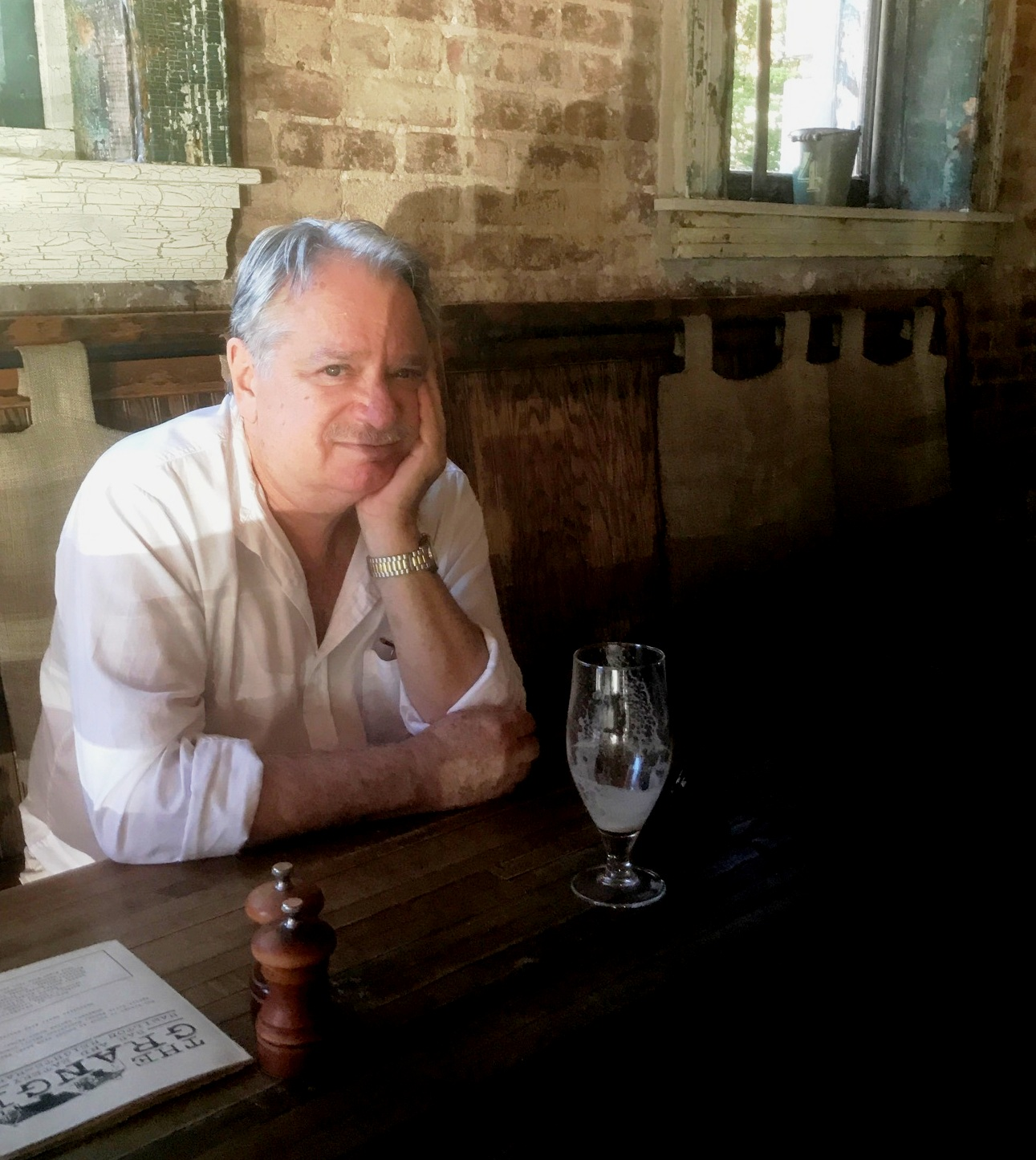
- Balaban in 2017
- Born: December 2, 1943 (age 82); Philadelphia, Pennsylvania
- Education: Pennsylvania State University, Harvard University
- Writing career
- Genre: Poetry
- Notable awards: William Carlos Williams Award, Medal for the Cause of Culture, Sports, and Tourism of Viet Nam

John B. Balaban (born December 2, 1943) is an American poet and translator, an authority on Vietnamese literature.

== Biography ==
Balaban was born in Philadelphia to Romanian immigrant parents, Phillip and Alice Georgies Balaban. He obtained a B.A. with highest honors in English from Pennsylvania State University in 1966. A Woodrow Wilson Fellowship that he received in his senior year at Penn State allowed him to study English literature at Harvard University, where he received his A.M.

Balaban was a conscientious objector in Vietnam during the Vietnam War. In a moment at Harvard which he writes about in his memoir Remembering Heaven's Face, he petitioned his draft board to allow him to drop his student deferment to go to Vietnam with the International Volunteer Services, where he taught at a university until it was bombed in the Tet Offensive. He was wounded in the shoulder by shrapnel and evacuated; after his recovery, he continued his alternative service and returned to Vietnam with the Committee of Responsibility to treat war-injured children.

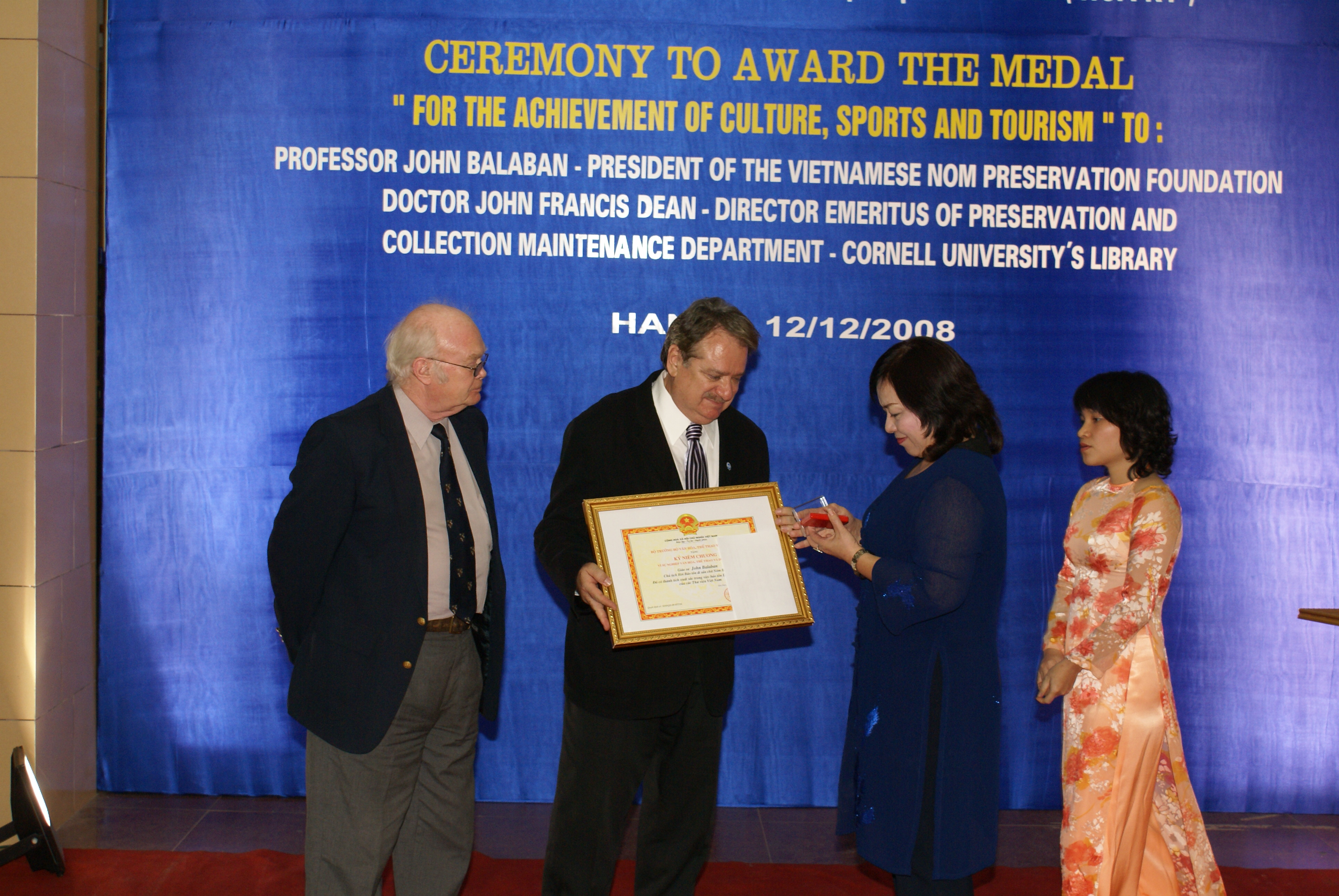
Balaban receiving the Medal for the Cause of Culture, Sports, and Tourism of Viet Nam from the Vietnam Ministry of Culture on December 12, 2008

He left Vietnam in 1969, subsequently testifying on civilian casualties before the Senate Judiciary Subcommittee chaired by Senator Ted Kennedy.

In 1971–72, as the war continued, he returned once again to tape, transcribe, and translate the sung oral poetry known as ca dao, resulting in his Ca Dao Viet Nam: Vietnamese Folk Poetry. Balaban's first published collection of his own verse, After Our War (1974), was a Lamont Poetry Selection of the Academy of American Poets and nominated for the National Book Award.

In 1999, he became a founder of the Vietnamese Nôm Preservation Foundation, which for twenty years led the digital preservation of ancient texts in Vietnam. In 2000, he released Spring Essence, a collection of poems by Hồ Xuân Hương, an 18th-century poet and the preeminent woman poet of Vietnam. The book included English translations and versions in both the current Vietnamese alphabet and the historical Chữ Nôm writing system.

Balaban has written poetry beyond his experiences in Vietnam. His collection Locusts at the Edge of Summer: New and Selected Poems won the 1998 William Carlos Williams Award. His Words for My Daughter was a National Poetry Series Selection. In 2006, Path, Crooked Path was named an Editor's Choice by Booklist and Best Book of Poetry by Library Journal.

In 2008, he was awarded a medal of appreciation from the Ministry of Culture of Vietnam for his leadership in the restoration of the ancient text collection at the National Library.

Balaban is professor emeritus at North Carolina State University.

== Bibliography ==
Poetry

- After Our War, (University of Pittsburgh Press, 1974)
- Blue Mountain, (Unicorn Press, 1982)
- Words for My Daughter, (Copper Canyon Press, 1991)
- Locusts at the Edge of Summer: New and Selected Poems, (Copper Canyon Press, 1997, 2003)
- Like Family, (Red Dragonfly Press: Minnesota, 2009)
- Path, Crooked Path, (Copper Canyon Press, 2006)
- Empires, (Copper Canyon Press, forthcoming October 2019)

Translations

- Ca Dao Viet Nam: Vietnamese Folk Poetry, (Unicorn Press, 1980) (Revised edition, Copper Canyon Press, 2003)
- Vietnam: A Traveler's Literary Companion, with Nguyen Qui Duc, (Whereabouts Press, 1996)
- Spring Essence, The Poetry of Ho Xuan Huong, (Copper Canyon Press, 2000)

Nonfiction

- With Geoffrey Clifford: Vietnam: The Land We Never Knew, (Chronicle Books, 1989)
- Remembering Heaven's Face: A Story of Rescue in Wartime Vietnam, (New York: Simon & Schuster/Poseidon, 1991. pp. 31–34) (Revised edition University of Georgia Press, 2002)

Fiction

- The Hawk's Tale, (Harcourt Brace Jovanovich, 1988)
- Coming Down Again, (Simon & Schuster/Fireside, 1989) & E-Book (https://openroadmedia.com/ebook/coming-down-again/9781480401259)

In anthology

- Ghost Fishing: An Eco-Justice Poetry Anthology, (University of Georgia Press, 2018)
- Armistice: A Laureate's Choice of Poems of War and Peace, (Faber & Faber, 2018)
- The New Oxford Book of War Poetry, (Oxford University Press, 2014)
- The Pushcart Book of Essays: The best essays from a quarter-century of The Pushcart Prize, (Wainscott, NY: 2002)
- The Best American Poetry:1999, (Scribner)
- Carrying The Darkness: The Poetry of the Vietnam War, (New York: Avon Books, 1985)
- Fifty Years of American Poetry, ed. Robert Penn Warren, (New York: H. N. Abrams, Inc., 1984)

== Awards and honors ==
- The George Garrett Prize for Service to Literature, Associated Writing Programs, 2017.
- Lannan Foundation Literary Residency, Marfa, Texas. 2002 & 2008.
- Guggenheim Fellowship, 2003.
- National Artist Award, Phi Kappa Phi Honor Society, 2001–2004.
- Medal from Ministry of Culture, Vietnam, 2008.
- National Poetry Series Book Selection, 1990
- National Endowment for Arts Fellowship (translation), 1985
- National Endowment for Arts Fellowship (poetry), 1978
- Fulbright Distinguished Visiting Lectureship, Romania, 1979
- The Steaua Prize, Romanian Writers Union, 1978
