= Free Radio San Diego =

San Diego, California; United States
- Frequency: 96.9 (MHz)
- Branding: Free Radio San Diego

Programming
- Format: Freeform

Ownership
- Owner: Unknown

History
- First air date: October 13, 2002

Technical information
- Class: Pirate
- ERP: 1,000 watts
- Transmitter coordinates: 32.726211°N 117.123420°W

Links
- Website: web.archive.org/web/20050929102035/http://pirate969.org/

Free Radio San Diego (96.9 FM) was an unlicensed radio station located in San Diego, California. The founders claim that its creation was a reaction to Federal Communications Commission restrictions on new radio licenses. They provided a commercial-free unlicensed broadcast beginning on October 13, 2002 — with occasional interruptions due to FCC raids and technical issues. The open-format music selection was chosen by DJ preference but was weighted towards punk rock. Also featured were syndicated news programs such as Democracy Now! and Free Speech Radio News.

== FCC enforcement actions ==
On July 21, 2005, U.S. Marshals and the Federal Communications Commission carried out a raid against Free Radio San Diego, effectively seizing all of their broadcast equipment. The station resumed broadcasting three months later from a new location.

The station did not broadcast over-the-air from January to October 2007, as a result of a $10,000 Notice Of Apparent Liability (NAL) For Forfeiture, which was later reduced to $750. However, it continued to broadcast online, via Internet.

As of January 2021, Christian radio station KRTM, based in Murrieta, California, is using the 96.9 frequency for K245AI, a licensed broadcast translator of their main station. This translator on the same frequency is now used for Latin pop station KLQV, owned by Univision Communications.
