= International Vietnamese Youth Conference =

An International Vietnamese Youth Conference is organized every two or three years by the Len Duong International Vietnamese Youth Network, drawing Vietnamese youths from around the world to gather and discuss topics relating to Vietnamese youths and to network with each other. These conferences are attended by between 200 and 600 young people from more than 15 countries. The Vietnamese spelling of the conference is "Đại Hội Thanh Niên Sinh Viên Việt Nam Thế Giới," (World Vietnamese Student Youth Conference) and is therefore also abbreviated and nicknamed "DH" (conf.), followed by the conference number, such as "DH1" for the first conference, "DH2" for the second, and so on.

== Politics ==
The Len Duong organization stems from overseas Vietnamese in multiple countries, and have been involved in diaspora politics, where the issue of concern was the sole Communist Party of Vietnam (CPV) holding authoritarian power over the entire country. These political groups justify their actions by claiming that human rights abuses in Vietnam are caused by the CPV.

Len Duong, among other groups, has organised campaigns speaking out against the detention of dissidents who call for additional political freedoms and multi-party elections (see Bloc 8406). The formation of political parties in Vietnam are prohibited by law. These kinds of critical statements against the CPV is the reason why the website is banned in Vietnam , which the government considers defaming.

Like most overseas Vietnamese political groups, Len Duong does not use the official flag of Vietnam and instead endorses the flag of South Vietnam, which is banned in Vietnam.

The initial formation of the Conference can be substantially attributed to these political activities. But while some of the conference activities are based around these political policies, others are based around the organisation's purpose to provide a platform to address issues concerning Vietnamese youth living in Vietnam and abroad, as well as to create a global social network among attendees through social mixers. Recent conferences have moved more to the left towards reconciliation, and have been attended by international students from Vietnam studying overseas.

== History ==
=== Melbourne in 1999 ===
The first conference was organised by Federal Vietnamese Students Association of Australia in January, 1999 in Melbourne, Australia. It is primarily through this conference that the idea of an international network and a recurring conference (every 2 years) was formally introduced and later transformed into the Lenduong organisation as it is today.

=== Paris in 2001 ===
The second conference was held in Paris, France, in the summer of 2001.

=== San Diego in 2003 ===
Attendees of the third conference are waving flags at the closing ceremony

The Third International Vietnamese Youth Conference was held in San Diego, United States. It was co-hosted by the Union of Vietnamese Student Associations of Southern California as well as the Phan Boi Chau Youth Network. The event started with an Opening Ceremony in Westminster, California on July 11, 2003, was followed by the conference workshops at the University of San Diego from July 12–13. It then was followed by a three-day camp at William Heise Park near San Diego and concluded with a press conference in Westminster, California on July 16. With almost 600 attendees from 16 different countries, DH3 continues to hold the record for being the largest conference in this series.

The French delegation to the third conference performs at the closing ceremony

The conference theme was Vietnam: The Road of Humanity - Actions from the Heart and Mind.

=== Sydney in 2005 ===
With DH4, the fourth conference returned to its original country Australia and was co-hosted by the Federal Vietnamese Students Association of Australia.

About 450 youths gathered for five days at the Bankstown Town Hall in the suburbs of Sydney from December 27, 2005 to January 1, 2006. This conference marked the first conference without a camp, although it included a one-day Amazing Race style activity around Sydney as a break from conference workshops.

The theme of this conference was Vietnamese Youths: Eliminating Barriers, Overcoming Challenges (Tuổi Trẻ Việt Nam: Xoá Ngăn Cách - Vượt Thử Thách in Vietnamese ). In this spirit, it included some unusually reconciliatory activities, such as a debate, in the form of a fictional legal trial, concerning what punishment should be given to a communist official who accidentally killed a protester supporting the old South Vietnamese regime. Topics also included:

- Lives and hopes of today’s youths
- Teamwork in the community
- Vietnamese History - 100 years since the Đong Du Movement
- Vietnamese History - Philosophies of Phan Bội Châu vs. Phan Chu Trinh
- The Education System and work force, from Vietnam to the West
- What is Human Right? Is there or is there not Human Rights in Vietnam?
- Social activities in Vietnam - Problems and Solutions
- Vietnam - Why must we be concerned?

Speakers included Vietnamese pre-democracy activist Nguyen Quoc Quan.

=== Kuala Lumpur in 2008 ===
The Fifth International Vietnamese Youth Conference took place from January 4, 2008 to January 6, 2008 in Kuala Lumpur, Malaysia. The conference theme was Building Civil Society in Vietnam - Grassroot Efforts for Democracy. Notable speakers of the conference included Premesh Chandran, CEO of a Malaysian news media organization, who spoke about grassroots approaches to free expression in the face of internet censorship and Chee Siok Chin from the Singapore Democratic Party. While Vietnamese film director Ham Tran was unable to attend, he gave the permission for his boat people drama Journey from the Fall to be screened at the festival to attendees. This conference also marked the first time, attendees also came from Vietnam.

=== Manila in 2011 ===
The Sixth International Vietnamese Youth Conference is scheduled for August 4, 2011 to August 7, 2011 with the theme Access Now! Digital Activism for Social Change.
