= Vietnamese Nôm Preservation Foundation =

American non-profit organization

- Hội Bảo tồn di sản Nôm 會保存遺産喃
- Abbreviation: VNPF
- Formation: 1999
- Dissolved: 2018
- Type: NGO
- Legal status: Dissolved
- Purpose: Language preservation
- Headquarters: Cary, North Carolina
- Location: 229 Beachers Brook Lane, Cary, North Carolina 27511, United States
- Fields: Linguistics
- Official language: English, Vietnamese
- President: Prof. John Balaban
- Website: nomfoundation.org (in English) nomfoundation.org/vn (in Vietnamese)

Vietnamese Nôm Preservation Foundation

Vietnamese name
- Vietnamese alphabet: Hội Bảo tồn di sản Nôm
- Hán-Nôm: 會保存遺産喃

The Vietnamese Nôm Preservation Foundation (Vietnamese: Hội Bảo tồn di sản Nôm; Hán Nôm: 會保存遺産喃), shortened as the Nôm Foundation and abbreviated as VNPF, was an American nonprofit agency for language preservation headquartered in Cary, North Carolina, with an office in Hanoi, Vietnam. Established in 1999, it was engaged in the preservation of Chữ Nôm script (an ancient, logographic, Chinese character-based script once used by the Vietnamese people to write their language) remained in manuscripts, inscriptions and woodblocks. In 2018, the Foundation declared its initial goal achieved and dissolved itself.

== Foundation ==
The preservation of Chữ Nôm practiced by the foundation involves different approaches, such as the electronic font carving, ideograms entered into Unicode and the International Standard (regulated by ISO), digitization for displaying Nôm on the Internet and the revival of ancient works in literature, history, culture, musics and the arts (e.g. the chamber music called ca trù).

With the help of voluntary linguists, lexicographers and computer professionals from many part of the world, the VNPF publishes Nôm dictionary in both print edition and digital format, making it the first Nôm dictionary in TrueType. While granting scholarships to American and Vietnamese students who intend to research this subject, the VNPF also sponsored two international Nôm conferences and represented Nôm script at the international meetings held by the Ideographic Rapporteur Group.

== Projects ==
There has been a scheme called the Digitization Project of the Hán-Nôm Special Collection cooperatively implemented by the Vietnamese Nôm Preservation Foundation and the National Library of Vietnam. In 2006, a Memorandum was signed by the VNPF, enabling it to build a digital library based on the existing collections in the National Library which stores world's most ancient scripts written in Hán Nôm. Through the resources from the National Library, the VNPF had digitized more than 2000 Hán Nôm texts until 2013.

Meanwhile, the VNPF has been directing another project to digitize the Thắng Nghiêm Temple (Vietnamese: Chùa Thắng Nghiêm; Hán Nôm: 𫴶勝嚴) near Hanoi. Constructed in the early 11th century under an imperial order, it is an important historical site for Asian Buddhism. The project will be completed by 2014, bringing a web database of the full record from the Temple, including manuscripts, epigraphical materials and visual heritages in Chữ Nôm. Additionally, the building structure and iconographical ideas of the Thắng Nghiêm Temple will be shown in a photographic overview.

Receiving funds from private donators, the Chino Cienega Foundation in California, the International Music and Arts Foundation in Liechtenstein, North Carolina State University and the U.S. Embassy in Hanoi, this project is aimed at recording Vietnamese Buddhism, offering historical documents of the Temple, opening a path for further temple digitization in the future and letting the materials to be globally accessible.

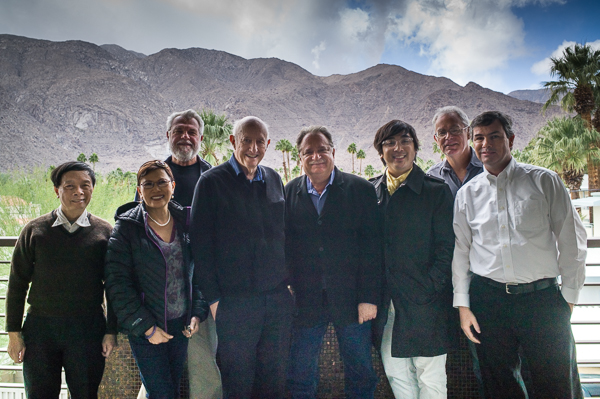
Board of the Vietnamese Nôm Preservation Foundation at 2013 meeting in Palm Springs, together with a scholar recipient John Phan

== Staff ==
Since 1999, Professor John Balaban at North Carolina State University has been the president of the VNPF. In 2000, he published his influential book Spring Essence: The Poetry of Ho Xuan Huong (written in both chữ quốc ngữ and Hán Nôm), which was the first Nôm book ever printed in the modern times. Dr. Ngô Thanh Nhàn, a Vietnamese characters researcher at Temple University and a computational linguist at New York University, was the vice president from 1999 to 2007. Currently the VNPF has two vice presidents (Ngô Trung Viet and Brad Crittenden) and one secretary/treasurer (Stephen O. Lesser).

== See also ==
- The Institute of Hán-Nôm Studies, a similar research center in Hanoi, Vietnam.
