= Radio Free Vietnam =

Broadcasting network of Vietnamese group

Radio Free Vietnam is the broadcasting network of a Vietnamese anti-communist group called the Government of Free Vietnam that is released throughout the world and its headquarters is located in Southern California.

It is a non-profit organization that is able to broadcast directly into Vietnam and all of Asia. It calls for the right of freedom of opinion and expression - including the freedom to seek, receive and impart information and ideas through any medium regardless of frontiers.
