= Crescent (disambiguation) =

A crescent is a shape symbolising the Moon.

Crescent may also refer to:

== Brands and enterprises ==
- Crescent (brand), a brand of tools after which the Crescent wrench takes its name
- Crescent (bicycle), a Swedish bicycle brand manufactured by Nymanbolagen (later Monark-Crescentbolagen)
- Crescent Arms, a firearms manufacturer bought by Savage Arms
- Crescent Capital Group, a private American investment firm
- Crescent Enterprises, a conglomerate based in the United Arab Emirates
- Crescent Foods, a Seattle, Washington, spice and flavorings company (1889–1983)
- Crescent Petroleum, a privately owned company headquartered in the United Arab Emirates
- Crescent Toys, a British toy manufacturer from 1922 to 1980

== Educational institutes ==
- Crescent College, Jesuit college based in Limerick, Ireland
- B. S. Abdur Rahman Crescent Institute of Science and Technology, a private higher education institute in Tamil Nadu, India.
- Crescent Girls' School, an all-girls' secondary school in Singapore
- Crescent School (disambiguation)

== Music ==
- Crescent (band), an alternative band from Bristol, UK
- Crescent (Egyptian band), a metal band from Egypt
- Crescent (John Coltrane album), a 1964 album
- Crescent, a 2003 album by Japanese pop/rock artist Gackt
- "Crescent", a song by Animals as Leaders from the album The Joy of Motion, 2014
- Crescent Records, a record label
- The Crescents, an Australian vocal harmony group, active from 1958 to 1962
- The Crescents, an American rock and roll band, with guitarist Thom Bresh

== People ==
- Crescent Dragonwagon (born 1952), American writer
- Guy Crescent (1920–1996), French businessman
- Guy-Crescent Fagon (1638–1718), French physician and botanist

== Places ==
=== Antarctica ===
- Crescent Bay, Victoria Land
- Crescent Glacier (Antarctica), Victoria Land
- Crescent Scarp, Palmer Land
- Crescent Stream, Victoria Land

=== Canada ===
- Crescent Falls, two falls in Alberta, Canada
- Crescent Street, a Montreal street famous for its nightlife
- Crescent Town, Toronto, a neighbourhood in Toronto, Ontario

=== Europe ===
- Crescent (Occitania), an Occitan dialectal zone
- Crescent Shopping Centre, a shopping mall in Limerick, Ireland
- The Crescent, Limerick, Georgian period development in Limerick, Ireland
- The Crescent, Wisbech, a Georgian period development in Wisbech, England.

=== United States ===
- Crescent, California, a region in Plumas County
- Crescent, Georgia, an unincorporated community
- Crescent, Idaho, an unincorporated community
- Crescent, Iowa, a city
- Crescent, New York, a hamlet
  - Crescent Bridge, over the Mohawk River
- Crescent, North Carolina, an unincorporated community
- Crescent, Ohio, an unincorporated community
- Crescent, Oklahoma, a city
- Crescent, Oregon, an unincorporated community
- Crescent, South Carolina, an unincorporated community
- Crescent, Utah, a city
- Crescent, Wisconsin, a town
- Crescent, Chippewa County, Wisconsin, an unincorporated community
- Crescent City (disambiguation)
- Crescent Glacier (Alaska)
- Crescent Glacier (Mount Adams), Washington
- Crescent Plantation, Tallulah, Louisiana
- Crescent Range, within the White Mountains of New Hampshire
  - Mount Crescent, a summit in the Crescent Range
- Crescent River (Georgia)
- Crescent Township (disambiguation)
- Crescent Township, Allegheny County, Pennsylvania

=== Vietnam ===
- Crescent Mall in Ho Chi Minh City

=== Elsewhere ===
- Crescent Beach (disambiguation)
- Crescent Island (disambiguation)
- Crescent Lake (disambiguation), including North American lakes
- Crescent Nebula, in the constellation Cygnus
- Fertile Crescent, a region comprising areas currently part of Iraq, Kuwait, Syria, Lebanon, Jordan, Israel, Cyprus, Egypt, Turkey and Iran

== Sports ==
- Cincinnati Crescents, an All-Star barnstorming baseball team that played in the mid-1940s
- Crescent Arena, Saskatoon, Saskatchewan, an indoor arena
- Crescent Boat Club, Philadelphia, Pennsylvania
- Halifax Crescents, an early amateur, later professional, ice hockey team in Halifax, Canada, from 1899 to 1948
- Old Crescent, Limerick City based rugby club
- Paterson Crescents, a defunct basketball team based in Paterson, New Jersey

== Transportation ==
- Crescent (train), an American passenger train running between New York City and New Orleans
- Crescent Air Cargo, an all-cargo airline based in Chennai, Tamil Nadu, India
- Crescent Shipyard, former shipyard in Elizabeth, New Jersey
- HMCS Crescent, a World War II Royal Canadian Navy destroyer
- HMS Crescent, 11 Royal Navy ship

== Other uses ==
- Crescent (architecture), an architectural structure comprising a number of houses laid out in an arc to form a crescent shape
- Crescent (novel), a 2003 novel by Diana Abu-Jaber
- Crescent (Pictish symbol)
- Crescent (solitaire), a card game
- Crescent Arts Centre in Belfast (Northern Ireland)
- Crescent meteorite of 1936, which fell in Oklahoma, United States (see meteorite falls)
- Crescent rolls, a type of puff pastry
- Crescent butterflies, brush-footed butterflies of the genera Anthanassa and Phyciodes

== See also ==
- Crescent moon (disambiguation)
- La Crescent (disambiguation)
- The Crescent (disambiguation)
