= Croissant (disambiguation) =

A croissant is a kind of crescent-shaped French pastry. For people with this surname, see Croissant (surname).

Croissant may also refer to:

== Places ==
- Aiguille du Croissant
- Croissant (linguistic zone)
- Café du Croissant
- Croissant Park Administration Building
- Lieu-Croissant Abbey
- Twisted Croissant

== Association football ==
- Croissant Club de Sig
- Croissant Sportif de M'saken

== Media ==
- Croissant (magazine)
- Lady Croissant
- Ordre du Croissant

== Other ==
- Croissant (metadata format)
- Croissant (surname)
- Paris Croissant
- Red Crescent, a humanitarian organization known in French as Le Croissant-Rouge
- République du Croissant

== See also ==
- Crescent rolls
