= Crescent moon =

Crescent moon may refer to:

== Lunar phases ==
- Fingernail moon, a lunar phase waxing until 7 days after or waning since 7 days before the new moon
- Hilal (crescent moon), an Arabic term for the very slight crescent moon that is first visible after a new moon

== Arts, entertainment, and media ==
- Crescent Moon (comics), a fictional DC comics character
- Crescent Moon (manga), the English title of the shōjo manga Mikan no Tsuki
- "Crescent Moon" (song), Mika Nakashima's 2nd single
- "Crescent Moon" (The Avengers), an episode of the television series The Avengers
- Crescent Moon Darnel, nicknamed Cress, a character in The Lunar Chronicles by Marissa Meyer
- The Crescent Moon, a 1913 collection of poetry by Rabindranath Tagore
- The crescent moon featured in the logo for the English dub of Sailor Moon.

== Other uses ==
- Anjaneyasana, or crescent moon, an asana (body position) in yoga
- Crescent Moon Society, a Chinese former literary society

== See also ==
- Crescent (disambiguation)
- Demilune (disambiguation)
- Half Moon (disambiguation)
- Star and crescent, an iconographic symbol sometimes associated with Islam
