= Saudi Aramco Beach =

Beach in Saudi Arabia

Saudi Aramco Beach Saudi Aramco Half Moon Beach
- Beach
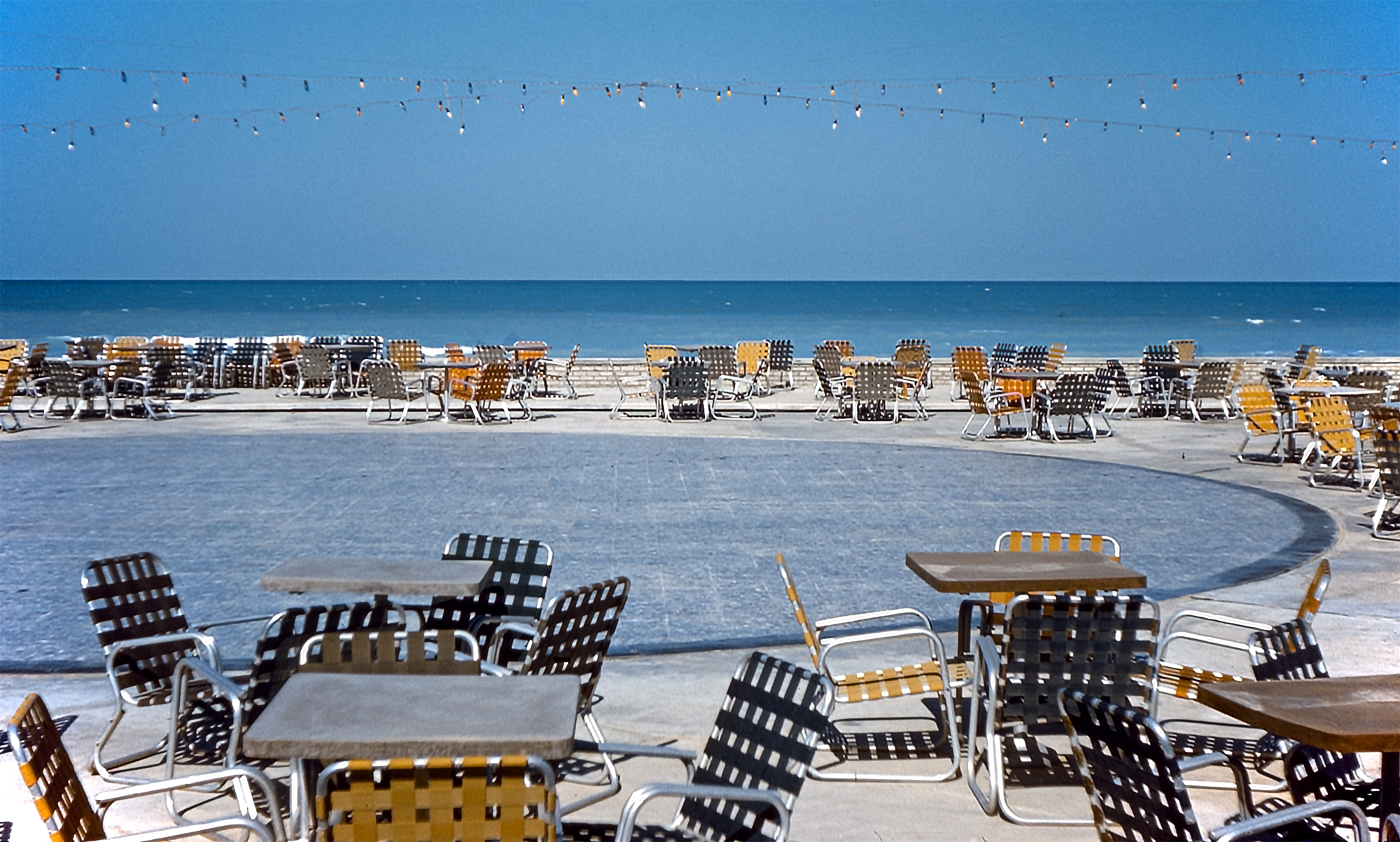
- Saudi Aramco Beach in 1959

- Coordinates: 26°07′37″N 50°05′21″E
- Part of: Half Moon Bay, Saudi Arabia

Saudi Aramco Beach, also known as Saudi Aramco Half Moon Beach, is a private beach owned and managed by Saudi Aramco, situated on the Half Moon Bay, part of the Dhahran Governorate near Khobar, Saudi Arabia. The beach is located on the eastern part of the inlet and has a coastline that is a little longer than 3 km (2 mi). Access is only granted to Saudi Aramco employees.

== History ==
The beach was part of the property given to Aramco while it was still an American company. US Air Force personnel stationed at the nearby Dhahran Air Field were also granted access to the beach.

The beach can be easily accessed via Route 617, which connects Half Moon Bay and Aziziyah
