= The Crescent =

The Crescent may refer to:

== Streets and buildings ==
- Crescent Arts Centre, an arts centre in Belfast, Northern Ireland
- The Crescent (Cincinnati, Ohio), listed on the National Register of Historic Places
- The Crescent (Dallas), an office, hotel, and retail complex in Texas, United States
- The Crescent (pub), a listed former public house in Salford, England
- The Crescent (Valdosta, Georgia), a house listed on the National Register of Historic Places
- The Crescent, Birmingham, a former terrace in Birmingham, England
- The Crescent, Limerick, a street in Limerick, Ireland
- The Crescent, Scarborough, a terrace of houses in North Yorkshire, England
- The Crescent, Selby, a terrace of buildings in North Yorkshire, England
- The Crescent, Wisbech, rows of terraced houses and religious buildings in Cambridgeshire, England
- The Crescent, part of the Downtown Ossining Historic District, New York

== Other uses ==
- The Crescent (band), an English indie band
- The Crescent (department store), a former department store chain headquartered in Spokane, Washington, United States
- The Crescent (film) (2017)

== See also ==
- The Fertile Crescent, crescent-shaped region in Western Asia, and the Nile Valley and Nile Delta of northeast Africa
- The Old Crescent, Bloomington, Indiana, listed on the NRHP in Indiana
- Royal Crescent
- Crescent (disambiguation)
