= Van Patton Shoals =

- Region
- Country: United States
- State: South Carolina
- County: Spartanburg

Van Patton Shoals are a river rapids and an unincorporated community in South Carolina located between Woodruff and Fountain Inn, and near the Crescent Community.

== Geography ==
Located on the Enoree River, Van Patton Shoals sits on the border of Spartanburg County and Laurens County. The geographical coordinates are 34°45′15.8″N 82°06′30.8″W.

Van Patton Shoals (South Carolina)

== Origin ==
Van Patton Shoals was settled by Nicholas Van Patten in the early 1800s, in order to take advantage of the Enoree River as a source of hydroelectric power. Originally named Van Patton, the shoals were later renamed to Van Patton Shoals.

== Shoals as a Source of Power ==
The Enoree Power Company began constructing a hydroelectric dam at the shoals in 1907 and completed it in 1908. The dam provided power to a small steam plant, which was constructed in Woodruff around the same time. Transmission lines rant to Fountain Inn, Simpsonville, and Conestee. Around 1917, the Enoree Power Company built and operated Leatherwood Shoals, or Lower Van Patton. This facility powered Woodruff and its two cotton mills. On October 25, 1927, the Broad River Power Company acquired the shoals hydroelectric plant and operated it until July 29, 1927, when the Wateree Power Company, under the control of Duke Power Company acquired the power plant.

Duke Power ran the plant until its final day of operation: August 16, 1968. The plant was shut down due to its inefficiency of the plant and silting of the reservoir. The dam and its powerhouse were destroyed on November 1, 1968, by the Duke Power Company.

== Van Patton Bridge ==
The Van Patton Bridge located on Highway 418 connects Spartanburg County and Laurens County. Due to flooding, the bridge had to be replaced in 1996.

== Lawsuit ==
On December 7, 1944, a lawsuit was filed against Spartanburg County over a death on Van Patton Bridge. In Mahon v. Spartanburg County, the death of George W. Mahon was investigated. Mahon drowned in the Enoree River after he drove his truck off of the bridge. In the lawsuit, the plaintiff argued that the death of Mahon was caused by the County's negligence regarding the maintenance of the bridge. The case was argued before the Supreme Court of South Carolina, where the case was returned to lower courts for a retrial.
