= Crescent Beach =

Crescent Beach may refer to several places:

== Canada ==
- Crescent Beach, Nova Scotia
- Crescent Beach, Lockeport, Nova Scotia
- Crescent Beach, Lunenburg County, Nova Scotia
- Crescent Beach, British Columbia

== United States ==
- Crescent Beach, Brevard County, Florida
- Crescent Beach, St. Johns County, Florida
- Crescent Beach, Sarasota County, Florida
- Crescent Beach, South Carolina
