= Saudi Investment Bank Tower =

General information
- Type: Office
- Location: Khobar, Saudi Arabia
- Completed: 1998

Height
- Antenna spire: 88 m (289 ft)

Technical details
- Floor count: 18
- Lifts/elevators: 8

Saudi Investment Bank Tower (also known as Al-Falak Tower) is a skyscraper located in the city of Khobar, Saudi Arabia. It is located on King Abdul Aziz Road in the growing business district of Tahila in Khobar. It is the second tallest building in Khobar, after Hugayat Tower. It is approximately 88 m (289 ft) high, and contains 18 floors including the basement levels. It was constructed in 1998, and the total cost of the project was US$75 million. As there is no skyscraper around it, it creates a silhouetted skyline in the evening.
