= Half Moon =

Half Moon, Halfmoon, half-moon, or Halve Maen may refer to:

- First quarter or last quarter lunar phase
- semicircle shape

== Food ==
- Half-moons or black and white cookies
- Half-moon cookie (Philippines), a semicircular or crescent-shaped butter cookie

== Places ==
- Half Moon Island, one of the South Shetland Islands of Antarctica
- Halfmoon, New York, U.S.; a town in Saratoga County
- Half Moon, North Carolina, U.S.; a location in Onslow County
- Half Moon (Washington), U.S.; a mountain in the Cascade Range
- Halfmoon Township, Centre County, Pennsylvania, U.S.
- Halfmoon Cove, a cove on the coast of the King George Island, in the archipelago of the South Shetland Islands

== Pubs ==
- Half Moon, Herne Hill, a pub and music venue in London
- The Half Moon, Putney, a pub and music venue in London

== Ships ==
- Halve Maen, a Dutch East India Company flyboat with which Henry Hudson explored parts of North America
- Half Moon (1989 replica), a replica of the ship that Henry Hudson sailed in 1609 in exploration of parts of North America
- Half Moon (shipwreck), a German sailboat that sank off the coast of Florida in 1930
- USCGC Half Moon (WAVP-378), later WHEC-378, a United States Coast Guard cutter in commission from 1948 to 1969
- USS Half Moon (AVP-26), a United States Navy seaplane tender in commission from 1943 to 1946

== Other uses ==
- Semicircular bund a half-moon shaped depression for collecting water
- Half Moon (film), a 2006 Iranian film by Bahman Ghobadi
- Half Moon (lacrosse), First Nations lacrosse player
- Halfmoon or Medialuna californiensis, a sea chub native to the Pacific Ocean
- Halve Maen (Efteling), a ship swing in the Efteling theme park in the Netherlands
- Half Moon Festival, a bi-monthly event on Ko Pha Ngan, Thailand
- Half Moon Run, a Canadian indie rock group
- Ardha chandrasana or Half Moon Pose, a yoga asana
- "Half Moon", a song by Iron & Wine from the album Kiss Each Other Clean
- a code name for the first-generation prototype Oculus Touch virtual reality motion controllers
- the supposed stage name of Beta from The Walking Dead
- 'Halfmoon', the stage name of a planet in the Milky Way Wishes subgame of Kirby Super Star and Kirby Super Star Ultra.

== See also ==
- Half Moon Bay (disambiguation), the name of various crescent-shaped bays
- Demilune (disambiguation)
- Crescent (disambiguation)
- Lunar phase
- Lunula (anatomy)
- Moon (disambiguation)
- Half (disambiguation)
