= Thomas H. B. Symons =

Canadian academic (1929–2021)

Thomas H. B. Symons CC, O.Ont, KSS

President and Vice-Chancellor of Trent University
- In office 1961–1972

Personal details
- Born: Thomas Henry Bull Symons; 30 May 1929 Toronto, Ontario
- Died: 1 January 2021 (aged 91) Peterborough, Ontario
- Spouse: Christine Ryerson (m. 1963)
- Children: 3
- Parent: Harry Lutz Symons (father)
- Education: Crescent School; Upper Canada College; Trinity College, Toronto (BA, 1951); Oriel College, Oxford (BA, 1953; MA, 1957)

Thomas Henry Bull Symons CC OOnt FRSC (1929 –2021) was a Canadian professor and author in the field of Canadian studies.

== Early life and education ==
Thomas Henry Bull Symons was born in Toronto on 30 May 1929, the son of writer Harry Lutz Symons and Dorothy Sarah Bull. His brother is writer Scott Symons. He studied at Crescent School and Upper Canada College, then earned a Bachelor of Arts (BA) from Trinity College, Toronto in 1951. After graduation, he attended Oriel College, Oxford, from which he earned another BA (1953) and a Master of Arts (1957). He later studied at Harvard University.

In 1981, Symons received an honorary _{doctorate from Concordia University.}

== Career ==
Symons began his career working at the University of Toronto's Trinity College, serving as a history tutor from 1953 to 1955, then as dean of a men's dormitory from 1955 to 1963.

In 1961, he became the founding president of Trent University, serving as its president and vice-chancellor until 1972, with the first students entering in the 1964-65 school year. Under his leadership, the university established Canada's first Indigenous studies program. While at Trent University, Symons was a proponent of Canadian studies, including helping to found the Journal of Canadian Studies.

Symons chaired multiple associations, including the Association of Commonwealth Universities (1971-72), the Ontario Human Rights Commission (1975-78), Commission on Canadian Studies (1972-84), the Historic Sites and Monuments Board (1986–96); the Commission on Commonwealth Universities (1995–1996); and the Ontario Heritage Trust (2010–17). In his work with the Ontario Rights Commission, Symons helped publish Life Together: A Report on Human Rights in Ontario, and "helped lead major advancements, particularly for the LGBT community".

Starting in 1978, Symons served as the founding vice-president of the Social Sciences and Humanities Research Council of Canada, a position he held until 1984. Throughout the 1980s, Symons worked with the Commonwealth Standing Committee on Student Mobility. He also served two three-year terms as chairman of the board of the United World Colleges (1980-86).

He was also the chairperson of the Peterborough Lakefield Community Police Service.

Symons retired in 1994.

Symon's contributions to university leadership, Canadian studies, Commonwealth studies, United World Colleges, the Association of Commonwealth Universities, and other fields were discussed in Ralph Heintzman (ed), Tom Symons: A Canadian Life, published by University of Ottawa Press. His leadership in universities and in Commonwealth Studies was discussed in Donald Markwell, "Instincts to Lead": On Leadership, Peace, and Education (Connor Court, 2013).

== Personal life ==
Symons married Christine Ryerson on 17 August 1963. They had three children.

He died on 1 January 2021.

== Honours ==
- 1976: he was made an Officer of the Order of Canada, then was promoted to Companion in 1997.
- 1977: he was made a Fellow of the Royal Society of Canada.
- 1981: he received an honorary doctorate from Concordia University.
- 1984: he received the Award of Merit from the Association for Canadian Studies.
- 1998: he received the Governor General's International Award for Canadian Studies.
- 2002: he was awarded the Order of Ontario.
- 2012: he was made a Knight of the Order of St. Sylvester
- 2012: he received the Queen Elizabeth II Diamond Jubilee Medal
- He is an Honorary Fellow of Oriel College, Oxford.

== Works ==
- Meta Incognita: A Discourse of Discovery - Martin Frobisher's Arctic Expeditions, 1576 - 1578 (1999)
- To Know Ourselves: The Report of the Commission on Canadian Studies (1975)
