= Harry L. Symons =

Canadian writer

- Born: Harry Lutz Symons; 1893; Toronto, Ontario, Canada
- Died: 1962 (aged 68–69)
- Occupations: humorist, novelist, non-fiction writer
- Writing career
- Period: 1940s-1960s
- Notable work: Ojibway Melody

Harry Lutz Symons (1893 - 1962) was a Canadian writer, who won the Stephen Leacock Memorial Medal for Humour in 1947 for Ojibway Melody, a volume of humorous essays about summer recreational life on Ontario's Georgian Bay.

His other works included Friendship (1943), Three Ships West (1949), The Bored Meeting (1951) and Orange Belt Special (1956), and the non-fiction works Fences (1958) and Playthings of Yesterday: Harry Symons introduces the Percy C. Band Collection (1963).

Symons, the son of architect William Limberry Symons, was an ace fighter pilot in World War I and later worked in insurance and real estate.

His son Thomas Symons, a noted academic, founding president of Trent University, and former chair of the Ontario Human Rights Commission, credits the values expressed in Ojibway Melody with framing his career and contributing to Trent's decision to establish Canada's first university department in Indigenous Studies. Another son, Scott Symons, was a writer whose 1967 novel Place d'Armes was the first gay-themed novel published in Canada.
