= Al Hugayet Tower =

- Interactive map of the Al Hugayet Tower area

General information
- Type: Residential / office
- Location: Khobar, Saudi Arabia
- Coordinates: 26.3085°N 50.2100°E
- Construction started: 2008
- Completed: November 2009
- Opened: 2011
- Cost: SR 345 million
- Owner: Abdul Hadi Al Hugayet Company

Height
- Tip: 140 m (460 ft)

Technical details
- Floor count: 26
- Lifts/elevators: 4

Al Hugayet Tower is a tower in Khobar, Saudi Arabia. The tower was completed in 2011. It is 140 metres (460 feet) tall and has 26 floors.

In 2022, Al Tamimi & Company law firm opened their office in the building. PwC is also located in the tower, serving the Eastern Province.

== See also ==
- List of tallest buildings in Saudi Arabia
