= Demilune =

Demilune, demi-lune, or similar, may refer to:

- Semicircle shape
  - A half-moon, the first quarter or last quarter lunar phase
- Semicircular bund, a rainwater harvesting technique in arid areas
- Ravelin, a type of fortification also called demi-lune
- Serous demilune (Demilunes of Heidenhain), the crescent shaped formations on salivary glands
- La Demi Lune, a card game also known as Crescent (solitaire)
- Demilune (Op.74), a composition by Alan Hovhaness; see List of compositions by Alan Hovhaness
- La Demi-Lune, Lannemezan, Hautes-Pyrénées, Occitanie, France; a neighbourhood
- Demi-Lune, La Demi-Lune, Lannemezan, Hautes-Pyrénées, Occitanie, France; a park

== See also ==
- Tassin-la-Demi-Lune, Lyons, Auvergne-Rhône-Alpes, France
- Half Moon (disambiguation)
- Crescent (disambiguation)
- Demi (disambiguation)
- Lune (disambiguation)
