= Crescent Beach, Nova Scotia =

Community in Nova Scotia, Canada

Coordinates: 44°14′51.57″N 64°24′9.15″W

Crescent Beach in Nova Scotia

Crescent Beach is a community in the Canadian province of Nova Scotia, located in the Lunenburg Municipal District in Lunenburg County. The community gets its name from the nearby beach of the same name. See Crescent Beach.
