= Crescent City =

Crescent City may refer to:

== Geography ==
- Crescent City, California
- Crescent City, Florida
- Crescent City, Illinois
- Crescent Mills, California, formerly named Crescent City
- "The Crescent City", popular nickname for New Orleans, Louisiana

== Music ==
- "Crescent City", a song about New Orleans by Lucinda Williams from her 1988 self-titled album
- Crescent City Radio, an Internet radio station based in New Orleans, Louisiana
- Crescent City, a hyper-opera by composer Anne LeBaron, premiered in Los Angeles 2012

== Other uses ==
- Crescent City (schooner), two ships that served Crescent City, California
- "Crescent City" (NCIS), a 2014 two-part episode of NCIS, that served as the backdoor pilot for NCIS: New Orleans
- Crescent City (fantasy series), an adult fantasy series by Sarah J. Maas
