= Scott Symons =

Canadian novelist and journalist (1933–2009)

- Born: Hugh Brennan Scott Symons; July 13, 1933; Toronto, Ontario, Canada
- Died: February 23, 2009 (aged 75)
- Occupations: Novelist, journalist
- Writing career
- Period: 1960s–1990s
- Notable works: Place d'Armes, Civic Square

Hugh Brennan Scott Symons (July 13, 1933 – February 23, 2009), known professionally as Scott Symons, was a Canadian writer. He was most noted for his novels Place d'Armes and Civic Square, among the first works of LGBT literature ever published in Canada, as well as a personal life that was often plagued by scandal and interpersonal conflict.

He was openly gay at a time when this was very difficult, publishing his first novel, Place d'Armes, which dealt directly with homosexuality, two years before gay sex was decriminalized in Canada. He was an avid diarist, and many of his observations and episodes from his life found their way into his novels. His writing style was marked by experimental forms and structures, with one of his novels being published as handwritten pages packaged in a box, and by a blurring of the lines between fiction and non-fiction.

== Early life ==
He was born in Toronto, Ontario, the son of businessman and writer Harry L. Symons and the brother of academic Thomas Symons. A rebellious teenager, he was sent by his parents to Trinity College School in Port Hope, where he took up gymnastics and established a lifelong friendship with journalist Charles Taylor. He also first came to realize that he was gay, falling in love with a fellow student but repressing his feelings in sport. Symons would later describe the experience as emotionally crippling, leaving him an "eternal thirteen; eternally the boy reaching out to touch but never being allowed to do so… except as Mommy and Authority permitted."

One night while practicing in the gymnasium, he fell off the high bar and broke his back, and was immobilized in a body cast for several months. After completing high school, he enrolled at the University of Toronto, where he earned a bachelor's degree in modern history as well as enlisting as a naval cadet and serving on the student government. He subsequently pursued graduate studies at Cambridge University.

Still attempting to repress his sexuality, Symons married Judith Morrow, the granddaughter of a president of the Canadian Imperial Bank of Commerce, in 1958. Taylor was his best man.

== Early career ==
He briefly took a job on the editorial page of the Toronto Telegram, but was soon fired for not being deferential to his bosses; he then took a job with the Quebec Chronicle-Telegraph, and integrated so quickly into the intellectual elites of Quebec that he was invited to join the St-Jean-Baptiste Society even though he was neither francophone nor Roman Catholic.

Symons and his wife spent some time studying at the Sorbonne in 1959; during this time, he met writer Julien Green, whom Symons would later describe as having reawoken his dormant sexuality. Symons and his wife returned to Canada the following year with their newborn son Graham after Symons accepted a job with La Presse in Montreal. While there, he won the Bowater Award for Journalism in 1961 regarding a series of articles concerning the early stirrings of what would become Quebec's Quiet Revolution.

With the nomadic restlessness that would characterize much of his life, however, he soon quit journalism and returned to Toronto, taking a job as a curator at the Royal Ontario Museum; within a few years, he was also an assistant professor of fine art at the University of Toronto, and briefly held a visiting curatorship at the Smithsonian Institution and a research associate's position at the Winterthur Museum. He was later offered a permanent position at the Smithsonian, but declined.

During this period he began to write but never finished a book on Canadian history and a stage play, and botched an audition to host This Hour Has Seven Days.

== Writing ==
In 1965 he fled the family farm in Claremont and holed up in a small hotel in Montreal for 21 days, during which he wrote Place d'Armes.

Place d'Armes contained both autobiographical and metafictional elements; its protagonist Hugh Anderson was, like Symons, a wealthy but socially alienated man from Toronto abandoning his comfortable bourgeois life to hole up in a hotel in Montreal, rediscovering himself in sex with male prostitutes in Place d'Armes, and in turn writing his own novel within a novel about Andrew, a character who himself fit the same profile as both Symons and Anderson. The writing was liberally peppered with sexualized puns such as "fingertits", "cocktit" and "assoul". The novel did not garner favourable reviews upon its publication in 1967; writing in the Toronto Star, Robert Fulford deemed Anderson as "the most repellent single figure in the recent history of Canadian writing", and criticized Symons, whom he called "the monster from Toronto", for being incapable of writing about love. Despite the criticism, however, Place d'Armes won the Beta Sigma Phi First Canadian Novel Award. Its critical reception has improved over time; in 2005, the Literary Review of Canada named Place d'Armes as one of the 100 most important books in Canadian literary history.

He followed up in 1969 with Civic Square, a novel whose working title The Smugly Fucklings was nixed by publisher Jack McClelland. The novel was noted for its unconventional form—a series of polemical letters addressed to "Dear Reader"—and presentation; 848 pages in length, it was neither typeset nor bound, but rather the original handwritten manuscript was duplicated by Gestetner, hand-decorated by Symons and then packaged in a blue box which was wrapped in white ribbon and emblazoned with a wax seal, with the title stamped on the box in silver ink. (Due to its unique format, the novel was published only as a limited edition, and was not widely available until Dundurn Press reissued it as a conventional paperback in 2007.) Once the project had been completed, Symons took a copy of the novel and placed it in the collection plate at his parents' church, Toronto's St. James Cathedral.

Around this time, Symons left his wife and entered his first long-term relationship with another man, a 17-year-old student named John McConnell. This relationship led to an incident which came to define public awareness of Symons; while media reports claimed that Symons had "run off to Mexico with an underage boy", in reality Symons had travelled to Mexico to attend an artists' retreat in San Miguel de Allende with York Wilson and Leonard Brooks rather than with McConnell, who had been sent by his parents to Nassau; McConnell separately travelled to Mexico, of his own accord, when he learned of Symons' whereabouts. Regardless, McConnell's parents posted a reward for Symons' arrest, putting police forces in Canada, the United States and Mexico on his trail, although the reward and arrest warrant were rescinded after McConnell contacted his family and threatened to commit suicide if Symons were jailed. Symons and McConnell then spent some time living in northern British Columbia, although they returned to Toronto by 1970. The pair continued to move frequently, residing at different times in Toronto, San Miguel de Allende and Trout River, Newfoundland and Labrador.

Despite this, Symons was hurt by the process of divorcing Judith, often insisting that he still loved her and wanted to stay married to her even if his actual conduct suggested otherwise. By this point, Symons was also virtually estranged from his own birth family, some of whom never saw him again until he was near death.

In 1971, Symons published the non-fiction book Heritage: A Romantic Look at Early Canadian Furniture. Although packaged and formatted as a coffee table book, Symons conceptualized it as a "furniture novel", deliberately blurring the lines between fiction and non-fiction by incorporating a narrative aspect which verged on erotic in some of its descriptions of the furniture.

He and McConnell broke up soon afterward.

== Exile in Morocco ==
By 1973, Symons had left Canada to live in Essaouira, Morocco, which would remain his primary residence for much of the remainder of his life. He was the subject of a chapter in Graeme Gibson's non-fiction work Eleven Canadian Novelists, published that same year.

In 1977, he published "The Canadian Bestiary: Ongoing Literary Depravity", a scathing review of Marian Engel's novel Bear, in West Coast Review (Vol. 11, No. 3). The review digressed to criticize many of the era's Canadian literary figures, including Irving Layton, Robertson Davies, Mordecai Richler, Victor Coleman, Jacques Godbout and Coach House Press, effectively burning many of Symons' bridges. Around the same time, Taylor published Six Journeys: a Canadian Pattern, which included a biographical essay about Symons. In 1979, he published a series of essays in The Globe and Mail under the title "Canada: A Loving Look". He was also a regular contributor to The Body Politic.

His third and final novel, Helmet of Flesh, was published in 1986. Semi-autobiographical like his earlier works, Helmet of Flesh centred on York Mackenzie, a Canadian man fleeing to Morocco after the breakup of his relationship with a younger man. The novel had been sent to Dennis Lee for editing several years before it was published. Upon the release of Helmet of Flesh, Symons described his guiding philosophy in an interview with June Callwood for The Globe and Mail: "I gave up everything so, first of all, I could feel, and in feeling, I could see, and in seeing, with some inner exploration, I could express...You have to risk. Sometimes I risk to the point of an anarchy, but I risk." Although purportedly the first book of a trilogy, no follow-up books to Helmet of Flesh have been published.

In 1990, he published two essays in The Idler, a critique of Margaret Atwood and a defense of Mazo de la Roche. Having published relatively little new writing since leaving Canada, however, he spent most of his time in Morocco relying primarily on financial support from Taylor.

He was in a relationship with Aaron Klokeid for much of his time living in Morocco; despite this, he strongly identified with the subversive "outlaw" aspects of homosexuality and disliked the increasing normalization and acceptance of gay people. He had little interest in participating in the gay liberation movement, and even harshly criticized Pierre Trudeau for decriminalizing homosexuality in his 1968 revision of the Criminal Code. Despite his frequent opposition to conventional sexual values, however, he often railed against the decline of Canada's British and French cultural traditions; he was especially outraged by Canada dropping the Canadian Red Ensign in favour of the contemporary maple leaf Flag of Canada, and dismissed many of the mainstream cultural institutions of Canada—including the Canada Council, Massey College, the Parliament of Canada and the Canadian Broadcasting Corporation—as "a Finishing School System for Wesleyans". In an Ottawa Citizen column after Symons' death, former Idler editor David Warren characterized Symons as a "violent Tory of the old school".

Symons returned to Toronto in 1986 for the publication of Helmet of Flesh, and in 1998 for an appearance at Toronto's International Festival of Authors on the release of God's Fool, a documentary film about him by filmmaker Nik Sheehan, and Dear Reader: Selected Scott Symons, an anthology of his published and unpublished writings edited by Christopher Elson. In declining health and with his financial support having dried up after Taylor's death, he returned to Toronto permanently in 2000.

In an interview with The Body Politic during his visit to promote Helmet of Flesh, Symons articulated his philosophy of sexual identity: "I am certainly a devoted homosexual. Nobody could doubt my credentials. But I think, politically, we allowed this word gay to. ... It buggers up a nice word. It doesn't cover what we are. A lot of us are not very joyous. We have a hard life to live, against the current. Gay doesn't cover that—and worst of all, it labels us. They can dismiss you and put you off in a corner: "Oh, he's gay," and that's it. That's the end. You can no longer be central to what's going on. That's tragic. ... The world loses central contact with some of the most beautiful, sentient, sensitive and agitated, creative and emotional people in our society. The result is that a lot of people who operate centrally in our society can't let on that they're gay. It's tragic. It's very dangerous."

He published a few journalism pieces in the National Post and worked on an unpublished novella, Kali's Dance. Both of his earlier novels, Place d'Armes and Civic Square, were reissued by Dundurn Press in the late 2000s.

He eventually moved into a nursing home, and died there in 2009 at the age of 75. Along with Robin Hardy and Norman Elder, he was the subject of a chapter in Ian Young's 2013 book Encounters with Authors: Essays on Scott Symons, Robin Hardy, Norman Elder.

== Bibliography ==
- Place d'Armes (1967; reissued 2010 ISBN 1554884578)
- Civic Square (1969; reissued 2007 ISBN 0889242984)
- Heritage: A Romantic Look at Early Canadian Furniture (1971, ISBN 0771083777) featuring photographs by John de Visser and a preface by George Grant
- Helmet of Flesh (1986, ISBN 0452262275)
- Dear Reader: Selected Scott Symons (1998, ISBN 1896356184) ed. Christopher Elson
