= Crescent Township =

Crescent Township may refer to the following places in the United States:

- Crescent Township, Iroquois County, Illinois
- Crescent Township, Pottawattamie County, Iowa
- Crescent Township, Allegheny County, Pennsylvania

== See also ==
- La Crescent Township, Houston County, Minnesota
