= Half Moon Bay (disambiguation) =

Half Moon Bay is a city in San Mateo County, California

Half Moon Bay may also refer to:

== Australia ==
- Halfmoon Bay (Tasmania), a bay in Tasmania, near Hobart
- Half Moon Bay (Victoria), a bay in Black Rock, Victoria

== Canada ==
- Half Moon Bay (Nunavut), an Arctic waterway in Nunavut
- Half Moon Bay, Ottawa, a neighborhood in Barrhaven, Ottawa
- Half Moon Bay (Toronto), a body of water near Ontario Place (west of Stanley Barracks / New Fort York) and place where United States Navy made land fall during the Battle of York
- Halfmoon Bay, British Columbia, a community on the Sunshine Coast of British Columbia

== Mexico ==
- Bahía de la Media Luna, a body of water near Akumal

== New Zealand ==
- Half Moon Bay, Auckland, a coastal suburb located near Pakuranga in Auckland
- Halfmoon Bay (Stewart Island), a bay on the eastern coast of Stewart Island/Rakiura and also sometimes the name for Oban, New Zealand on the same island

== Saudi Arabia ==
- Half Moon Bay, Saudi Arabia

== United States ==
- Half Moon Bay (California), a bay on the San Mateo County coast of California, namesake of the city there

== Other uses ==
- Half Moon Bay (album), by Bill Evans, 1998
- "Half Moon Bay", a 2009 song by Train from Save Me, San Francisco
- Half Moon Beach, Gokarna

== See also ==
- 2023 Half Moon Bay shootings
