= Iroquois Township, Iroquois County, Illinois =

Iroquois Township
- Township
- Location in Iroquois County

- Iroquois County's location in Illinois
- Coordinates: 40°48′55″N 87°49′20″W
- Country: United States
- State: Illinois
- County: Iroquois
- Established: May 1858

Area
  - Total: 36.64 sq mi (94.9 km^{2})
  - Land: 36.28 sq mi (94.0 km^{2})
  - Water: 0.36 sq mi (0.93 km^{2}) 0.97%
- Elevation: 620 ft (190 m)

Population (2020)
  - Total: 512
  - Density: 14.1/sq mi (5.45/km^{2})
- Time zone: UTC-6 (CST)
  - Summer (DST): UTC-5 (CDT)
- ZIP codes: 60911, 60928, 60930, 60970
- FIPS code: 17-075-37725

Iroquois Township is one of twenty-six townships in Iroquois County, Illinois, USA. As of the 2020 census, its population was 512 and it contained 262 housing units. Iroquois Township was formed from a portion of Middleport Township as Westfield Township in May 1858; The name was changed to Iroquois Township on an unknown date.

== Geography ==
According to the 2021 census gazetteer files, Iroquois Township has a total area of 36.64 square miles (94.90 km^{2}), of which 36.28 square miles (93.96 km^{2}) (or 99.03%) is land and 0.36 square miles (0.93 km^{2}) (or 0.97%) is water.

=== Cities, towns, villages ===
- Crescent City (northeast three-quarters)

=== Cemeteries ===
The township contains these four cemeteries: Flesher, Kirby, Pierce and Wilson.

=== Major highways ===
- U.S. Route 24
- Illinois Route 49

=== Airports and landing strips ===
- Braden Farms Airport
- Dietchweiler Airport

== Demographics ==
As of the 2020 census there were 512 people, 223 households, and 148 families residing in the township. The population density was 13.98 inhabitants per square mile (5.40/km^{2}). There were 262 housing units at an average density of 7.15 per square mile (2.76/km^{2}). The racial makeup of the township was 96.88% White, 0.00% African American, 0.20% Native American, 0.00% Asian, 0.00% Pacific Islander, 0.39% from other races, and 2.54% from two or more races. Hispanic or Latino of any race were 1.37% of the population.

There were 223 households, out of which 20.60% had children under the age of 18 living with them, 44.39% were married couples living together, 12.56% had a female householder with no spouse present, and 33.63% were non-families. 30.90% of all households were made up of individuals, and 14.30% had someone living alone who was 65 years of age or older. The average household size was 2.32 and the average family size was 2.78.

The township's age distribution consisted of 17.6% under the age of 18, 6.0% from 18 to 24, 20.8% from 25 to 44, 29.9% from 45 to 64, and 25.5% who were 65 years of age or older. The median age was 49.8 years. For every 100 females, there were 106.0 males. For every 100 females age 18 and over, there were 93.6 males.

The median income for a household in the township was $47,679, and the median income for a family was $66,563. Males had a median income of $53,977 versus $24,625 for females. The per capita income for the township was $24,517. About 20.9% of families and 16.6% of the population were below the poverty line, including 14.3% of those under age 18 and 16.7% of those age 65 or over.

Historical population
Census	Pop.	Note	%±
2000	671		—
2010	625		−6.9%
2020	512		−18.1%
U.S. Decennial Census

== School districts ==
- Central Community Unit School District 4
- Crescent Iroquois Community Unit School District 249
- Iroquois County Community Unit School District 9
- Iroquois West Community Unit School District 10

== Political districts ==
- Illinois' 15th congressional district
- State House District 75
- State Senate District 38
