= The Idler (Canadian magazine) =

Canadian literary magazine (1985–1993)

- Former editors: Gerald Owen
- Categories: Literary magazine
- Frequency: Monthly (irregular)
- Paid circulation: 4,300
- Total circulation: 8,000 (1993)
- Founder: David Warren
- Founded: January 1985
- First issue: 1985
- Final issue: 1993
- Country: Canada

The Idler was a Canadian literary magazine, published from 1985 to 1993. Named after Samuel Johnson's 18th-century historical essay series The Idler, the magazine included poetry and fiction but was mainly dedicated to essays. The Idler described its ideal reader as "a sprightly, octogenarian spinster with a drinking problem, and an ability to conceal it."

Initially a bimonthly, The Idler became a monthly magazine in 1989. However, its publication schedule was often disrupted by its chronic financial difficulties.

== History ==
The Idler was launched by David Warren, a freelance journalist and editor, in January 1985, and was run under Warren's editorship with Gerald Owen undertaking the managing editor's role. Funded entirely by Warren's own savings, the first issue was almost entirely given away in an effort to gain notice and build a subscription list. The public's disappointing response to Warren's efforts at promotion led to the magazine suspending publication after its sixth issue. In 1986, Manny Drukier, a Toronto businessman, intervened to rescue the magazine from collapse. Among his innovations were the conversion of the magazine's offices into a pub intended to serve as a literary salon where customers could engage in intellectual conversation, attend literary readings, and help to fund the magazine through alcohol and food sales.

Although initially founded on the principle that it would not seek government assistance, The Idler applied for grants from the Canada Council and the Ontario Arts Council in 1987. Its applications that year were declined by both organizations, with statements that the juries felt that the publication was substandard; it was viewed more favourably by the University of Ottawa, which sought permission to reprint half a dozen Idler articles as "examples of fine prose" in a textbook of essays and journalism. The editors and some in the mainstream press claimed that the magazine had been denied the grants because of its political outlook. Because the Canada Council had approved grants to 97 other magazines, The Idler then launched a subscription drive under the slogan "Subscribe to the 98th Best Literary Magazine in Canada".

In 1989, Warren left the magazine to become a political columnist for the Kingston Whig-Standard, and Owen was joined by new partners Paul Wilson and Alexander Szemberg. The new editorial team announced plans to expand the magazine from a bimonthly to a monthly. That year the magazine was successful in receiving grants from both the Ontario Arts Council and the Canada Council, although Drukier withdrew his financial support.

The magazine was acquired by Devon Cross in 1992. Cross brought Warren back as the magazine's editor, and Owen, Wilson and Szemberg left. The magazine lost its Canada Council support that year, with critics again alleging that the magazine was dropped for "political correctness" reasons, though its Ontario Arts Council support was renewed. While not a direct financial contributor to the magazine's operations, Conrad Black supported the magazine with a subscription deal, under which subscribers to the Hollinger-owned newspapers that included Saturday Night magazine as a supplement could opt to switch to The Idler. At this time, the magazine also received a $25,000 grant from the Smith Richardson Foundation.

The magazine ceased publishing in 1993 after its grant from the Smith Richardson Foundation ran out; it was unable to convince the foundation to support the magazine for another year, on the grounds that the magazine's content was not conservative enough, and was more literary than policy-oriented.

Despite the magazine's cessation, The Idler Pub remained in operation until 2002.

== Editorial style ==
Although founded on High Tory conservative principles, contributors to the magazine actually represented a much more diverse range of political views. One of its sole ideological redlines was that it would not publish content that supported abortion; otherwise, the magazine was willing to print any writing, whether progressive or conservative or apolitical, that was written from an intellectual perspective and not beholden to what Warren perceived as Establishment values. According to columnist Barbara Amiel, "while it is inaccurate to describe it as a right-wing publication, it is perhaps accurate to say it has a right-wing cultural sensibility – insofar as it values excellence and elite cultural standards"; according to Warren himself, "we struck the pose of 18th-century gentlemen and gentlewomen, and used sentences that had subordinate clauses. We reviewed heavy books, devoted long articles to subjects such as birdwatching in Kenya or the anthropic cosmological principle, and we printed mottoes in Latin or German without translating them. This left our natural ideological adversaries scratching their heads."

Most frequently compared to The New Yorker, the magazine was deliberately archaic in its design. It was printed on heavy stock book paper rather than glossy magazine or newspaper stock, and typeset in Baskerville. It included some cartoons similar to those in The New Yorker, but was otherwise illustrated with woodcut prints and lithographs rather than photographs.

One of the magazine's most famous features was its "Amours & Companions" column, a personals column for readers looking for love which was renowned for the quirkiness of many of the ads. The first appearance of "Amours & Companions" consisted entirely of fake ads written by the staff to demonstrate the desired tone for real submissions in subsequent issues.

Contributors to the magazine included Scott Symons, Michael Coren, Malcolm Muggeridge, Josef Skvorecky, Jane Jacobs, George Grant, Andrew Coyne, Neil Bissoondath, Mark Kingwell, Patricia Pearson, David Frum, Kildare Dobbs, Russell Smith and Danielle Crittenden.
