= Al-Rakah Antiquities =

- آثار الراكة
- Location: Al-Khobar, Saudi Arabia

Al-Rakah Antiquities are a collection of remains of buildings, gold face mask, gold chains and some pottery pieces, its may belong to the 4th millennium BC. Its located in Al-Rakah in Al-Khobar, Saudi Arabia. Some researcher indicated that there is many Antiquities in the same area that belong to the Hellenistic Period, and Sasanian period.

== Al-Rakah ==
Al-Rakah located in the north of Al-Khobar city. John Gordon Lorimer wrote about it in his book Gazetteer of the Persian Gulf, Oman and Central Arabia: "A well located on the coast one mile northwest of Al-Husayn Castle".

== Description ==
The city was underground, they excavation the area and discover 20 house and many wells. The lower layer of the houses was covered with 10 cm of sand, topped with a layer of compost. The house consist of four bedrooms one of them for only making date molasses, this explains that the area was full of palm trees. They discover in the same place some pottery pieces and ceramic pieces, glass, soapstone and some of coins from the first and second Hijri century (Sadr Al-Islam, the Umayyad period and the beginning of the Abbasid era).

The house has an external courtyard which include many ovens. Each group of houses has a well, while the depth of the well is two meters. Also, the well is connects with a basin. Then the water serve the northern side and southeast .
