= Crescent, South Carolina =

Unincorporated community in South Carolina, US

Crescent
- unincorporated community
- Location in South Carolina Location in the United States
- Coordinates: 34°46′15″N 82°06′40″W
- Country: United States
- State: South Carolina
- County: Spartanburg
- Time zone: UTC−5 (Eastern (EST))
  - Summer (DST): UTC−4 (EDT)

Crescent is an unincorporated community in Spartanburg County, in the U.S. state of South Carolina.

== History ==
A post office called Crescent was established in 1898, and remained in operation until 1933. The community was named for a crescent meander on the nearby Enoree River.
