= Croissant (surname) =

Croissant (French for "crescent") is a French surname. Notable people with the surname include:

- Aurel S. Croissant (born 1969), German political scientist and academic
- Benoît Croissant (born 1980), French footballer
- Francis Croissant (1935–2019), French archaeologist, art historian and academic
- Klaus Croissant (1931–2002), German lawyer, spy and political activist
- Odile Croissant (1923–2020), French biologist, physicist and specialist in electron microscopy

== See also ==
- Croissant, a French Viennoiserie
- Lady Croissant, a live album by Australian singer Sia
