= Enoree River =

River in South Carolina, United States

Coordinates: 34.433260°N 81.411793°W

The Enoree River is a tributary of the Broad River, 85 mi (137 km) long, in northwestern South Carolina in the United States. Via the Broad and Congaree Rivers, it is part of the watershed of the Santee River, which flows to the Atlantic Ocean.

== Route ==
The Enoree rises in the foothills of the Blue Ridge Mountains in Greenville County about 2 mi (3 km) northwest of the town of Travelers Rest, and flows generally southeastwardly across the Piedmont region, through or along the boundaries of Spartanburg, Laurens, Union and Newberry Counties, past the communities of Taylors and Whitmire and through the Sumter National Forest. It flows into the Broad River from the west in Newberry County, 15 mi (24 km) northeast of the town of Newberry.

== Variant names and spellings ==
According to the Geographic Names Information System, the Enoree River has also been known historically as:

- Collins River
- Ennoree River
- Ganoree

The name Enoree is thought to be derived from a Cherokee word meaning river of muscadines. Linguist Blair A. Rudes alternatively suggested that the name Enoree derives from the Catawba word enuree, which has been translated as 'it is little crow'. Anthropologist John R. Swanton proposed that the river obtained its name from the Eno who possibly lived on or near it during the prehistoric era.

== Hydroelectric power ==
A hydroelectric dam at Van Patton Shoals rapids provided power to nearby Woodruff from 1907 until its demolition in 1968.

== See also ==
- List of South Carolina rivers
