= Crescent, Idaho =

Unincorporated community in Idaho, United States

Coordinates: 46°38′36″N 116°25′32″W

Crescent is an unincorporated community in Latah County, in the U.S. state of Idaho.

== History ==
A post office called Crescent was established in 1895, and remained in operation until it was discontinued in 1930. The community reportedly once had a bedbug problem so severe, the also infested church was known locally as "Bedbug Church".

Crescent's population was 47 in 1909.
