= Crescent City, Illinois =

- Village
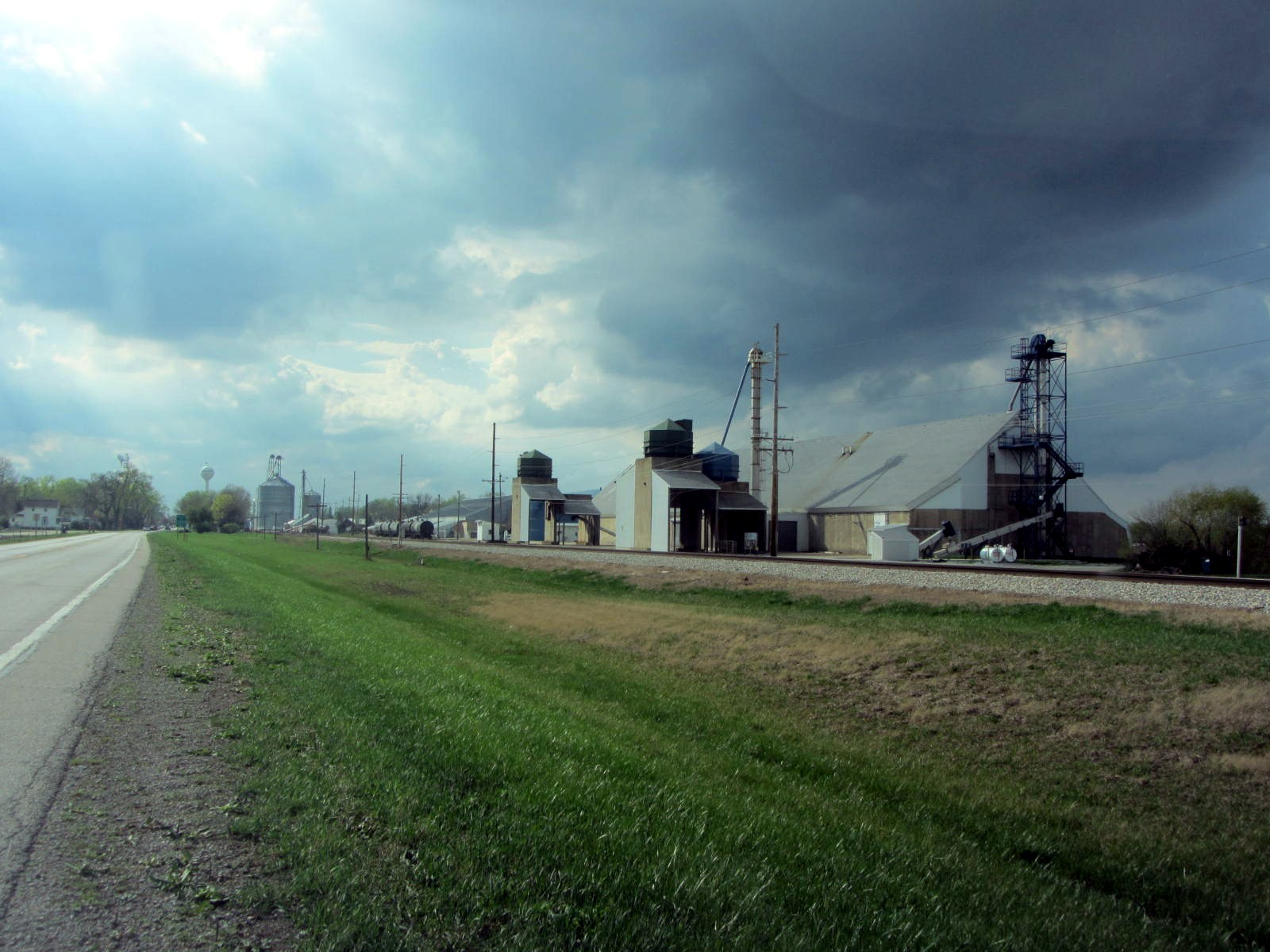
- Entering Crescent City under a stormy sky

- Location of Crescent City in Iroquois County, Illinois

- Crescent City's location in Iroquois County
- Coordinates: 40°46′18″N 87°51′24″W
- Country: United States
- State: Illinois
- County: Iroquois
- Township: Crescent, Iroquois

Area
  - Total: 0.46 sq mi (1.18 km^{2})
  - Land: 0.46 sq mi (1.18 km^{2})
  - Water: 0 sq mi (0.00 km^{2})
- Elevation: 640 ft (200 m)

Population (2020)
  - Total: 552
  - Density: 1,211.5/sq mi (467.76/km^{2})
- Time zone: UTC-6 (CST)
  - Summer (DST): UTC-5 (CDT)
- ZIP code: 60928
- Area code: 815
- FIPS code: 17-17406
- GNIS feature ID: 2398645

Crescent City is a village in Iroquois and Crescent townships, Iroquois County, Illinois, United States. The population was 552 at the 2020 census.

== History ==
=== Railroad accident ===
On June 21, 1970, the Toledo, Peoria and Western Railroad Company's Train No. 20 derailed in downtown Crescent City. A propane tank car ruptured, and explosions caused fires that destroyed the city center, which included numerous houses and businesses. There were no deaths, although over 60 firefighters and civilians were injured. The disaster would later be featured on episode #124 of the Discovery Channel show Destroyed in Seconds.

=== High School ===
In 2009, Crescent-Iroquois High School, the main high school for the village, was shut down. This meant that the elementary school would have to send the graduating 8th graders to surrounding high schools. The building was then used for special education purposes until around 2019, when they transferred them to Gilman, Illinois. In May 2022, the board of education accepted for the building to be demolished. The class of 2023-24 was the first K-5 institution of the elementary school, after the 6th-8th grade classes were repurposed.

== Geography ==
Crescent City is located in central Iroquois County. U.S. Route 24 passes through the center of the village, leading east 6 miles (10 km) to Watseka, the county seat, and west 7 miles (11 km) to Gilman near Interstate 57. Illinois Route 49 crosses US 24 on the western side of Crescent City; it leads north 8 miles (13 km) to US Routes 45 and 52 near L'Erable, and south 23 miles (37 km) to Rankin.

According to the 2021 census gazetteer files, Crescent City has a total area of 0.46 square miles (1.19 km^{2}), all land.

== Demographics ==
Historical population
Census	Pop.	Note	%±
1870	201		—
1880	207		3.0%
1900	371		—
1910	341		−8.1%
1920	310		−9.1%
1930	304		−1.9%
1940	332		9.2%
1950	324		−2.4%
1960	409		26.2%
1970	597		46.0%
1980	641		7.4%
1990	541		−15.6%
2000	631		16.6%
2010	615		−2.5%
2020	552		−10.2%
U.S. Decennial Census

As of the 2020 census, there were 552 people, 224 households, and 146 families residing in the village. The population density was 1,210.53 inhabitants per square mile (467.39/km^{2}). There were 268 housing units at an average density of 587.72 per square mile (226.92/km^{2}). The racial makeup of the village was 93.48% White, 0.18% African American, 0.36% Native American, 0.18% Asian, 0.00% Pacific Islander, 0.00% from other races, and 5.80% from two or more races. Hispanic or Latino of any race were 2.17% of the population.

There were 224 households, out of which 29.5% had children under the age of 18 living with them, 49.11% were married couples living together, 12.50% had a female householder with no husband present, and 34.82% were non-families. 29.46% of all households were made up of individuals, and 14.73% had someone living alone who was 65 years of age or older. The average household size was 2.62 and the average family size was 2.17.

The village's age distribution consisted of 18.4% under the age of 18, 7.0% from 18 to 24, 26% from 25 to 44, 26.6% from 45 to 64, and 22.1% who were 65 years of age or older. The median age was 43.1 years. For every 100 females, there were 85.8 males. For every 100 females age 18 and over, there were 79.2 males.

The median income for a household in the village was $57,500, and the median income for a family was $71,389. Males had a median income of $55,179 versus $27,411 for females. The per capita income for the village was $31,276. About 7.5% of families and 8.0% of the population were below the poverty line, including 11.2% of those under age 18 and none of those age 65 or over.

== Gallery ==
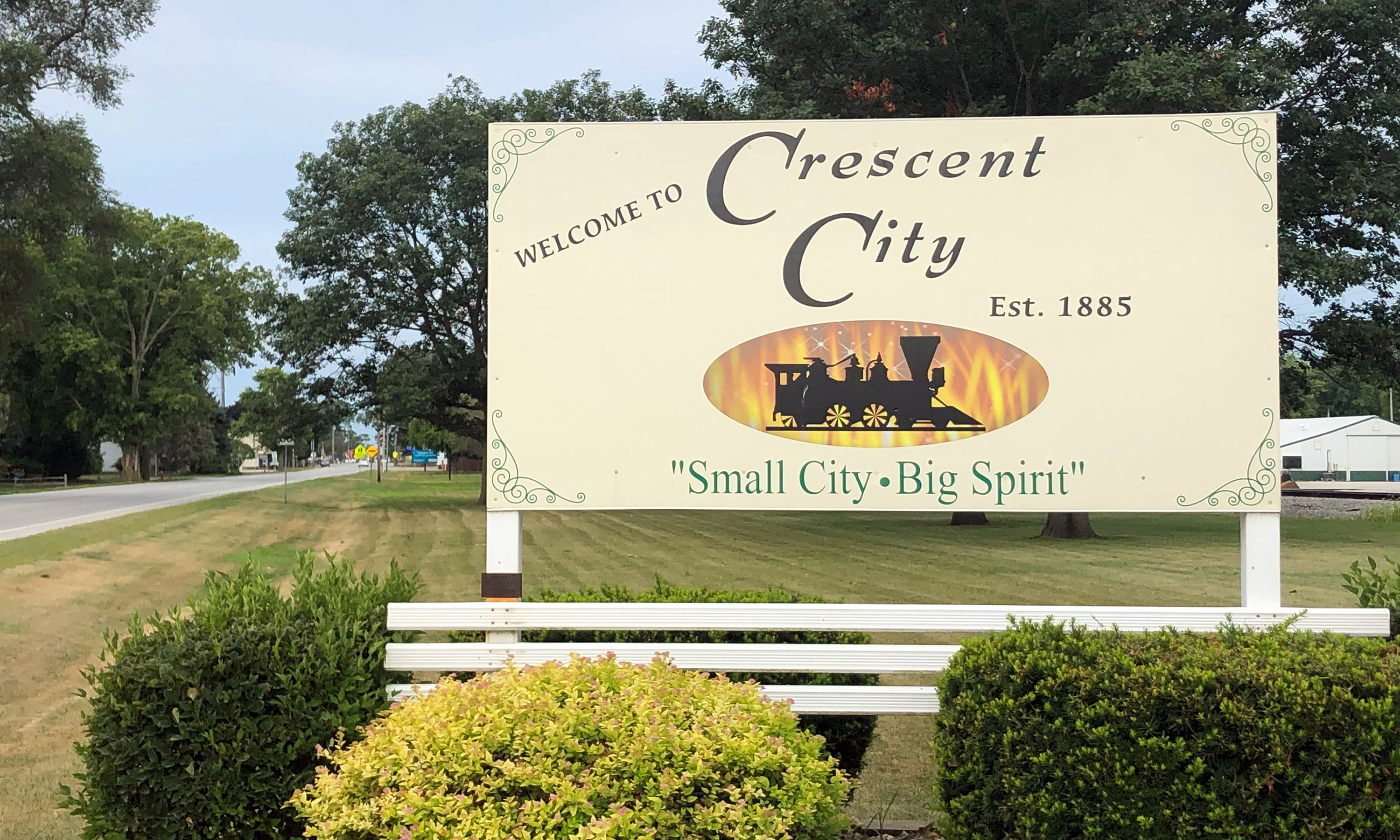
Welcome sign

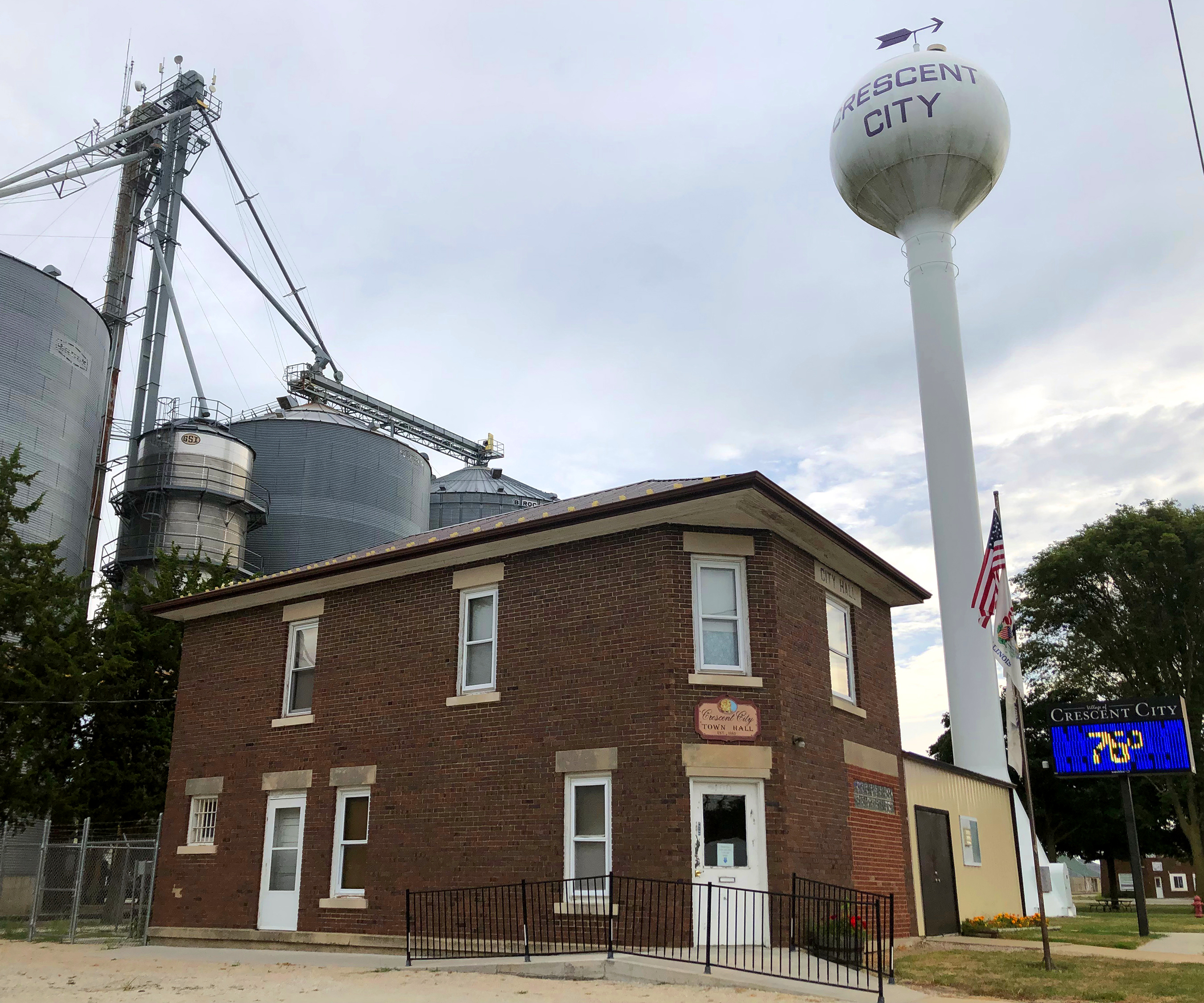
Town hall and water tower

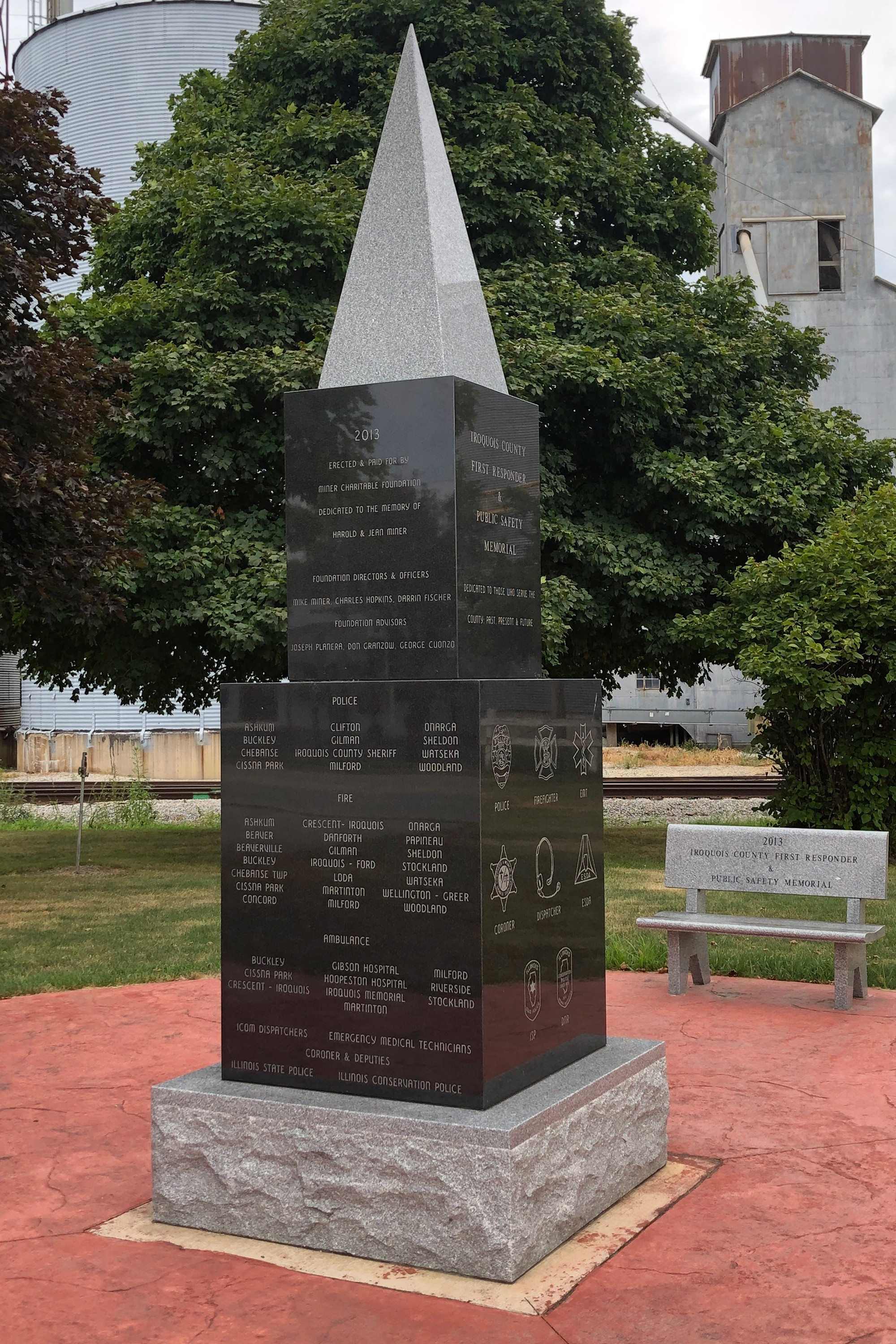
Monument
