= Crescent rolls =

Crescent rolls may refer to

- Croissant, a crescent-shaped pastry made from laminated dough
- Pillsbury Crescents, a type of premade laminated dough made by The Pillsbury Company invented in the United States in the 1960s
  - The material that comprises Poppin' Fresh, the Pillsbury Doughboy
- Crescent roll dough, a yeasty dough similar to puff pastry and pie crust

== See also ==
- Crescent (disambiguation)
- Roll (disambiguation)
