= Crescent, North Carolina =

- Populated place
- Interactive map of Crescent, North Carolina
- Coordinates: 35°34′31″N 80°25′13″W
- Country: United States
- State: North Carolina
- County: Rowan
- Elevation: 807 ft (246 m)
- Time zone: UTC-5 (Eastern (EST))
  - Summer (DST): UTC-4 (EDT)
- ZIP code: 28138
- Area code: 704
- GNIS feature ID: 1019855

Crescent is a populated place in Rowan County, North Carolina, United States.

== History ==
The Crescent post office existed from March 5, 1898 to May 29, 1925. Rev. Dr. J.M.L. Lyerly was the first post master of Crescent. Rev. Lyerly was a native of Crescent and head of the Crescent Academy that he founded and conducted. He was known as a leader of the Reformed Church in North Carolina.

Crescent has been in the Gold Hill Township since 1868, when the North Carolina state constitution required counties to be divide into townships.

== Geography ==
Crescent is located at latitude 35° 34′ 31″ N and longitude 80° 25′ 13″ W. The elevation is 807 feet.

== Demographics ==
Crescent has always been a small community. Since 1870, the census population of Gold Hill Township includes the population of Crescent.
