= Crescent Island (disambiguation) =

Crescent Island may refer to:

- Crescent Island, Bay of Isles, South Georgia
- Crescent Island (Nunavut), Canada
- Crescent Island, Lake Naivasha, Kenya
- A name for Temoe in the Gambier Islands, French Polynesia
- A codename for a Xe 3P-based GPU that Intel expects to launch in late 2026

== See also ==
- Ngo Mei Chau (娥眉洲, Crescent Island), in Hong Kong
