= Crescent Township, Iroquois County, Illinois =

Crescent Township
- Township
- Location in Iroquois County

- Iroquois County's location in Illinois
- Coordinates: 40°43′40″N 87°49′19″W
- Country: United States
- State: Illinois
- County: Iroquois
- Established: September 17, 1868

Area
  - Total: 36.42 sq mi (94.3 km^{2})
  - Land: 36.42 sq mi (94.3 km^{2})
  - Water: 0 sq mi (0 km^{2}) 0%
- Elevation: 650 ft (198 m)

Population (2020)
  - Total: 567
  - Density: 15.6/sq mi (6.01/km^{2})
- Time zone: UTC-6 (CST)
  - Summer (DST): UTC-5 (CDT)
- ZIP codes: 60928, 60938, 60953, 60955, 60970
- FIPS code: 17-075-17367

Crescent Township is one of twenty-six townships in Iroquois County, Illinois, USA. As of the 2020 census, its population was 567 and it contained 259 housing units. Crescent Township was originally named Logan Township when it formed from Belmont Township on September 17, 1868. The named was then changed to Grenard Township in September 1869, and finally to Crescent Township on an unknown date.

== Geography ==
According to the 2021 census gazetteer files, Crescent Township has a total area of 36.42 square miles (94.33 km^{2}), all land.

=== Cities, towns, villages ===
- Crescent City (southeast quarter)

=== Cemeteries ===
The township contains Saint Peter's Lutheran Cemetery.

=== Major highways ===
- U.S. Route 24
- Illinois Route 49

== Demographics ==
As of the 2020 census there were 567 people, 235 households, and 187 families residing in the township. The population density was 15.57 inhabitants per square mile (6.01/km^{2}). There were 259 housing units at an average density of 7.11 per square mile (2.75/km^{2}). The racial makeup of the township was 94.36% White, 0.18% African American, 0.18% Native American, 0.53% Asian, 0.00% Pacific Islander, 0.18% from other races, and 4.59% from two or more races. Hispanic or Latino of any race were 3.53% of the population.

There were 235 households, out of which 32.80% had children under the age of 18 living with them, 66.81% were married couples living together, 10.21% had a female householder with no spouse present, and 20.43% were non-families. 14.90% of all households were made up of individuals, and 8.10% had someone living alone who was 65 years of age or older. The average household size was 2.30 and the average family size was 2.51.

The township's age distribution consisted of 13.7% under the age of 18, 11.9% from 18 to 24, 23.1% from 25 to 44, 27.8% from 45 to 64, and 23.5% who were 65 years of age or older. The median age was 47.0 years. For every 100 females, there were 83.7 males. For every 100 females age 18 and over, there were 84.2 males.

The median income for a household in the township was $67,708, and the median income for a family was $71,042. Males had a median income of $60,179 versus $28,173 for females. The per capita income for the township was $45,626. About 3.7% of families and 5.2% of the population were below the poverty line, including 6.8% of those under age 18 and none of those age 65 or over.

Historical population
Census	Pop.	Note	%±
2000	660		—
2010	590		−10.6%
2020	567		−3.9%
U.S. Decennial Census

== School districts ==
- Cissna Park Community Unit School District 6
- Crescent Iroquois Community Unit School District 249
- Iroquois County Community Unit School District 9

== Political districts ==
- Illinois' 15th congressional district
- State House District 105
- State Senate District 53
