= Twisted Croissant =

Bakery in Portland, Oregon, U.S.

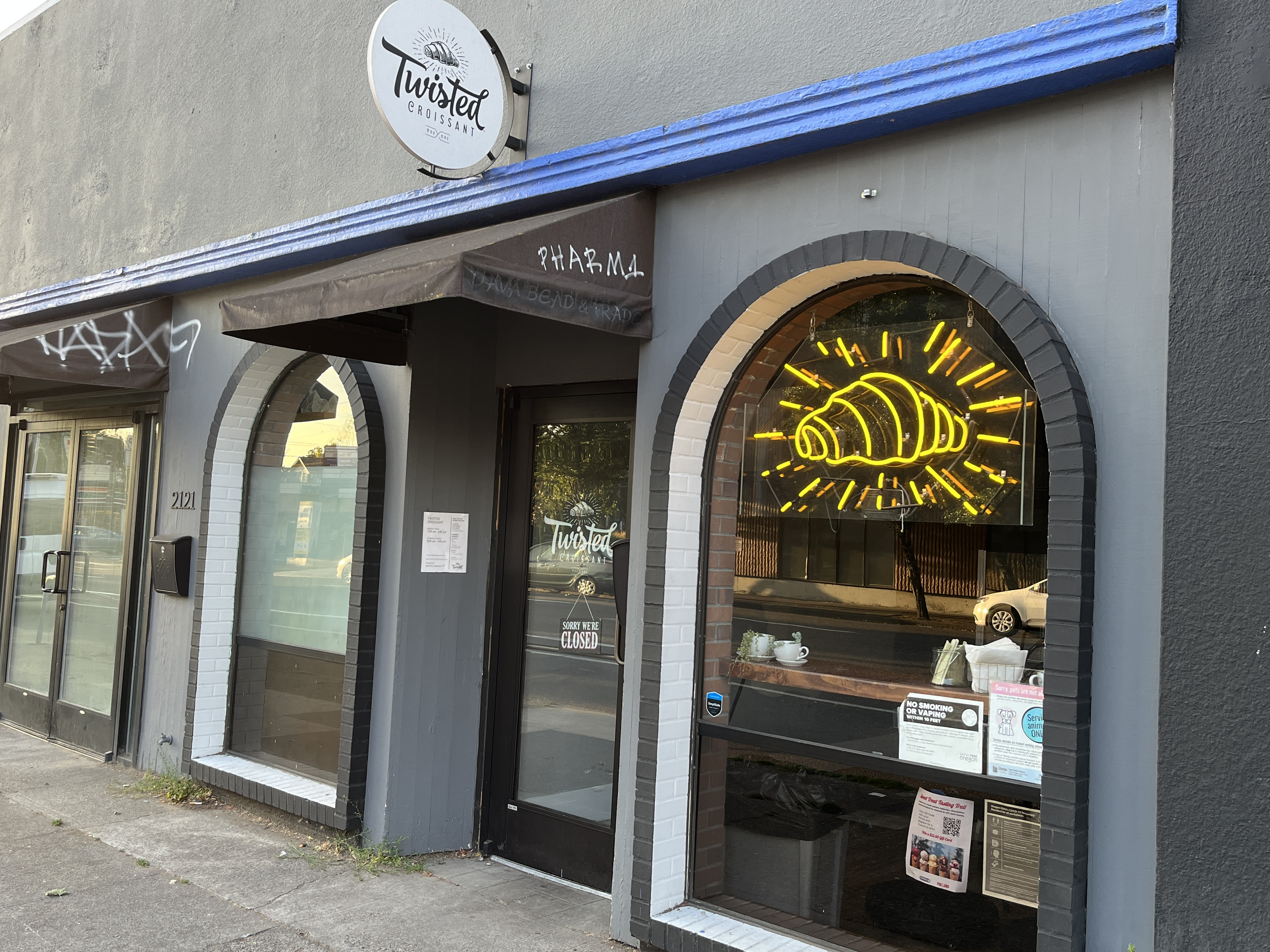
- Exterior of the Irvington shop, 2022
- Interactive map of Twisted Croissant

Restaurant information
- Established: 2017
- Owner: Kurt Goddard
- Location: Portland, Multnomah, Oregon, United States
- Coordinates: 45.5352°N 122.6442°W
- Website: twistedcroissant.com

Twisted Croissant is a bakery with two locations in Portland, Oregon. Owner Kurt Goddard began selling pastries at farmers' markets in the Portland metropolitan area before opening the first brick and mortar bakery in northeast Portland's Irvington neighborhood in 2019. A second bakery opened in southeast Portland's Sellwood-Moreland neighborhood.

== Description ==
Twisted Croissant is a bakery with two locations in Portland's Irvington and Sellwood-Moreland neighborhoods. The bakery's products are also available at various weekend farmers' markets.

The business serves croissants with fillings such as ganache, mascarpone-lemon glaze, and seasonal fruit. The Loaded Corn Bread Croissant is made with corn flour and is filled with corn, green chiles, pancetta, green onion, and cheddar cheese. Willamette Week described the croissant as "basically patisserie as empanada". The Monte Carlo has ham, turkey, and Gruyère cheese, and is topped with crumbled bacon and maple syrup.

The menu has also included caramel apple cruff puffs, and "croissant-doughnut and croissant-muffin hybrids filled with fun flavors", according to Michael Russell of The Oregonian. The Raspberry Rose Cruffin, considered Twisted Croissant's "signature", has vanilla custard, raspberry jam, and a rosewater glaze.

Some of the shop's pastries take as long as three days to make.

== History ==
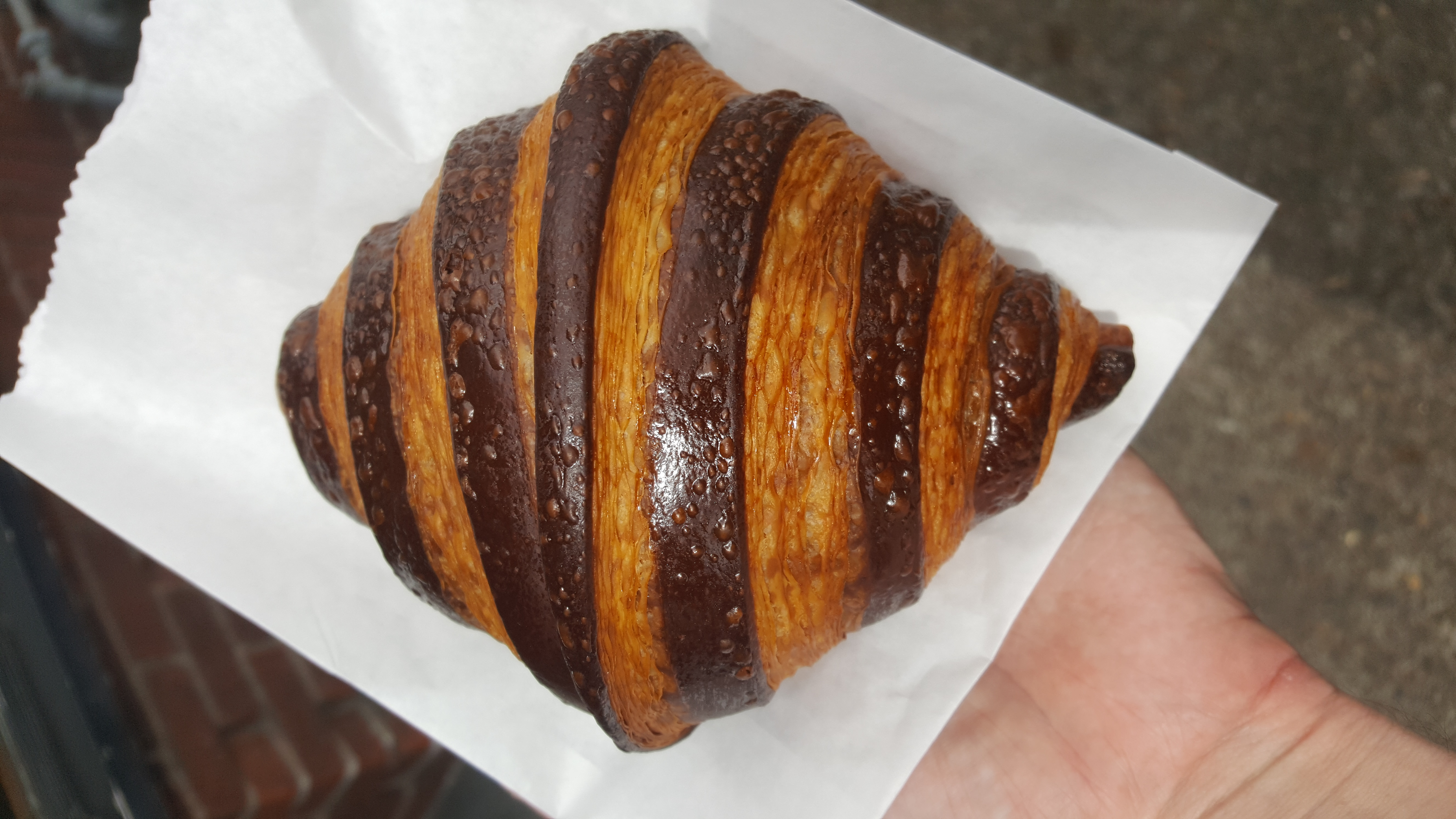
Pastry

Owner and head chef Kurt Goddard started selling pastries at farmers' markets in Beaverton, Hillsboro, and Portland (including the Hillsdale and Montavilla neighborhoods) in 2017.

In 2018, Goddard announced plans to open a brick and mortar bakery in northeast Portland's Irvington neighborhood. The 1,800-square-foot space, which opened on September 6, 2019, is used primarily for production and offers limited seating within the 600 square feet dedicated to retail operations.

During the COVID-19 pandemic, the business continued to operate via take-out and Uber Eats, except on Mondays. The business was burglarized in 2020. By 2022, a second location had opened in southeast Portland's Sellwood-Moreland neighborhood.

In 2023, the business offered a cha siu bao (barbecued pork) croissant for Lunar New Year. Twisted Croissant had special menu items for the holiday again in 2025.

== Reception ==
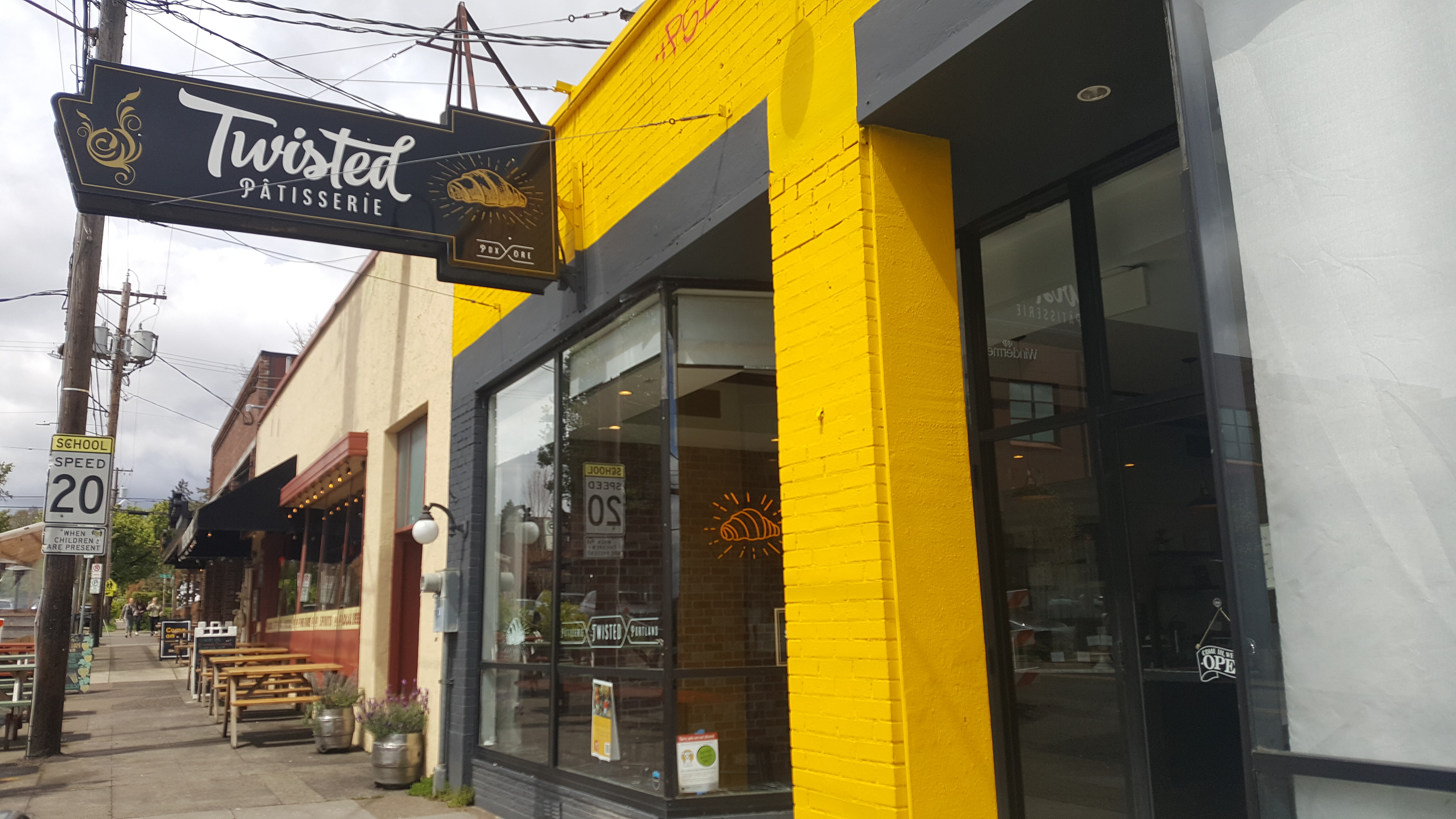
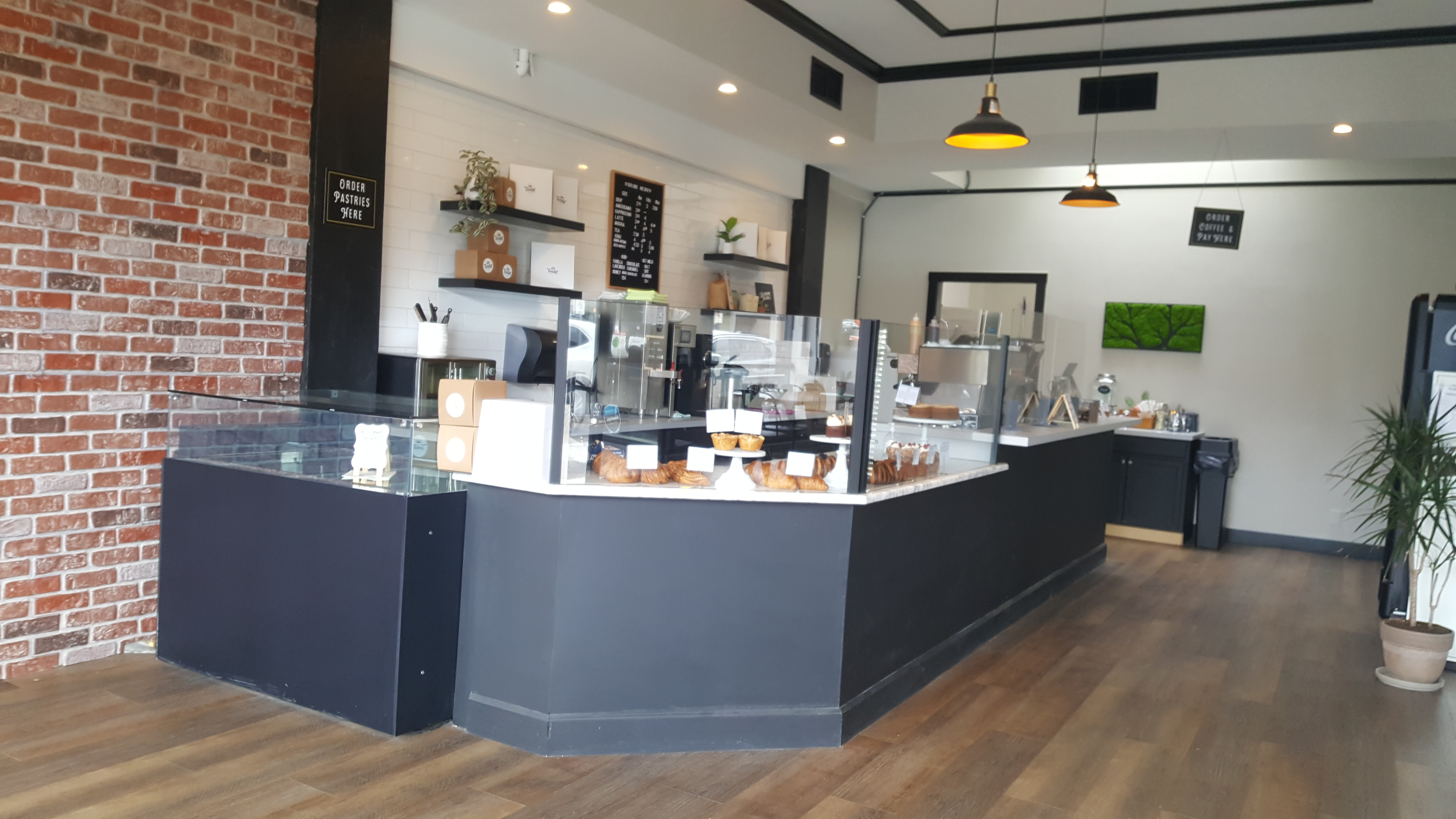
Exterior (top) and interior (bottom) of the bakery in southeast Portland's Sellwood-Moreland neighborhood, 2022

In 2018, Tamara Belgard of Oregon Wine Press said of the bakery's cruffins: "Twisted Croissant in Portland is the mad genius behind this creamy-on-the-inside, crispy-on-the-outside confection. Using seasonal and local flavors, their mission is to reimagine the possibilities of the timeless pastry. Frankenstein foods have never tasted better." Michael Russell gave Twisted Croissant "honorable mention" in The Oregonian's 2019 list of the city's best croissants. Katherine Chew Hamilton ranked the business number three in Portland Monthly's 2021 list of "our top 6 chocolate croissants". Tiffany Hill of the magazine PDX Parent included Twisted Croissant in a 2021 list of the top five "kid tested and approved" bakeries in the Portland metropolitan area.

In 2019, Brooke Jackson-Glidden of Eater Portland called Twisted Croissant a "neighborhood haunt" with "inventive" options. Michelle Lopez included the business in the website's 2021 overview of "where to find flaky, crackly croissants" in Portland, followed by a 2023 list of "outstanding" bakeries in the metropolitan area. The website's Nathan Williams included Twisted Croissant in a 2023 list of 14 "delightful spots to eat and drink on Northeast Broadway", in which he complimented select baked goods and also wrote, "The coffee is quite good, sparing patrons a trip to another coffee shop in the neighborhood." Lopez and Janey Wong included the business in Eater Portland's 2025 overview of the city's best bakeries.

== See also ==
- List of bakeries
- List of restaurant chains in the United States
