= La Crescent =

La Crescent may refer to:

- La Crescent, Minnesota, US, a city
- La Crescent Township, Houston County, Minnesota, US
- La Crescent (grape), a white grape varietal developed at the University of Minnesota

== See also ==
- La Crescenta-Montrose, California, a census-designated place
