= Crescent Air Cargo =

Indian cargo airline

- Founded: 2004; 22 years ago
- Ceased operations: 2006; 20 years ago
- Hubs: Chennai International Airport
- Fleet size: 3 (at closure)
- Headquarters: Chennai
- Key people: Santosh Lad, CMD
- Website: www.crescentaircargo.com(defunct)

Crescent Air Cargo was an all-cargo airline based in Chennai, Tamil Nadu, India. Its main base was Chennai International Airport.

== History ==
Crescent Air Cargo was incorporated as a Private Limited Company in January 2002, with its registered office at Chennai, though flight operations only began in 2004. In 2006, the airline was shut down again.

== Destinations ==
Crescent Air Cargo operated freight services to the following domestic and international destinations:

India

- Hyderabad - Rajiv Gandhi International Airport
- Delhi - Indira Gandhi International Airport
- Bengaluru - Bengaluru International Airport
- Mumbai - Chhatrapati Shivaji International Airport
- Visakhapatnam - Visakhapatnam Airport
- Chennai - Chennai International Airport - base

Maldives

- Malé - Malé International Airport

Sri Lanka

- Colombo - Bandaranaike International Airport

== Fleet ==
The Crescent Air Cargo fleet consisted of three Fokker 50 turboprop aircraft (in cargo configuration).
