= HMS Crescent =

Eleven ships of the Royal Navy have borne the name HMS Crescent:

- HMS Crescent (1643) was a 14-gun ship purchased in 1643. She was captured in 1648 by the Royalists and wrecked in 1649.
- HMS Crescent (1692) was a 6-gun fireship, formerly of the French navy. She was captured in 1692 by HMS Dover and sold in 1698.
- HMS Crescent (1758) was a 32-gun fifth rate. She was formerly the French privateer Rostan, which HMS Torbay captured in 1758. Crescent was sold in 1777.
- HMS Crescent (1779) was a 28-gun sixth rate launched in 1779, that the French captured off Cádiz in 1781.
- HMS Crescent (1784) was a 36-gun fifth rate launched in 1784 and wrecked off Jutland in 1808.
- HMS Crescent (1810) was a 38-gun fifth rate launched in 1810, reassigned to harbour service in 1840 and sold in 1854.
- HMS Crescent (1854) was a wood paddle tender purchased in 1854, and sold in 1855.
- HMS Crescent (1892) was an Edgar-class first class cruiser launched in 1892. She was sold in 1921.
- HMS Crescent was previously the Canopus-class battleship HMS Glory, renamed Crescent when she became a depot ship in 1920, before being sold in 1922.
- HMS Crescent (1931) was a C-class destroyer launched in 1931, but transferred to the Royal Canadian Navy in 1937 and renamed HMCS Fraser. She was sunk in 1940 in a collision with HMS Calcutta.
- HMS Crescent (R16) was a C-class destroyer launched in 1944 and transferred on loan to the Royal Canadian Navy in 1945. She was bought outright by the Canadians in 1951 and converted into a frigate in 1956. She was paid off in 1970 and broken up in 1971.
