= Crescent Beach (Nova Scotia) =

Beach in Nova Scotia, Canada

Coordinates: 44.234186°N 64.40296°W

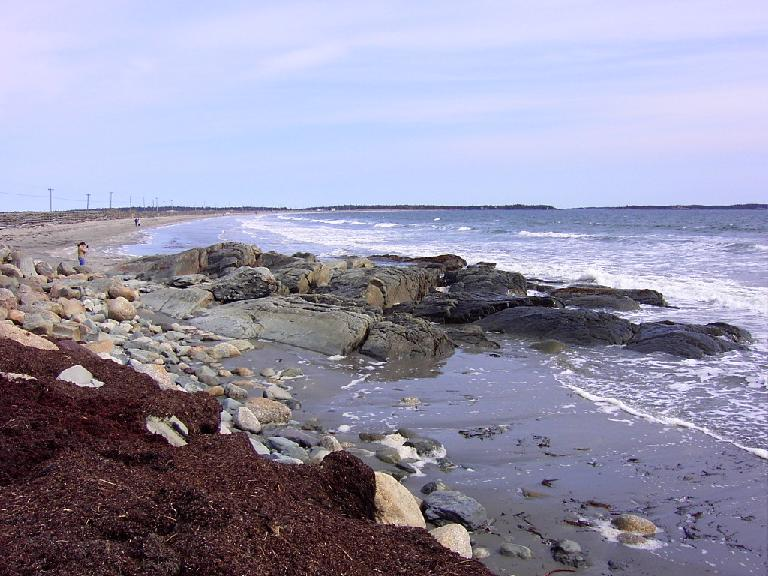

Crescent Beach is a 2 km long, 40 to 65 m wide crescent-shaped beach, with white sand, not far from the community of LaHave and the town of Lunenburg (famous for the Bluenose schooner). Other nearby communities are Green Bay and Petite Riviere. The beach is known for its sandy dunes and windsurfing.

Crescent Beach in Nova Scotia

The sand beach is separated from the tidal flats and salt marsh of Dublin Bay by sand dunes which rise in height from 2 m in the west to 6.8 m near the east end. A large wooden fence has existed between the beach and dunes since the 1930s.

The Crescent Beach sand bar connects some of the LaHave Islands to the mainland. Prior to the construction of the paved road behind the dunes running the length of the backshore, the beach was primarily used as a path to and from George Island which is part of the LaHave Islands.

Automobiles are permitted on the actual beach itself, something rare in Nova Scotia.

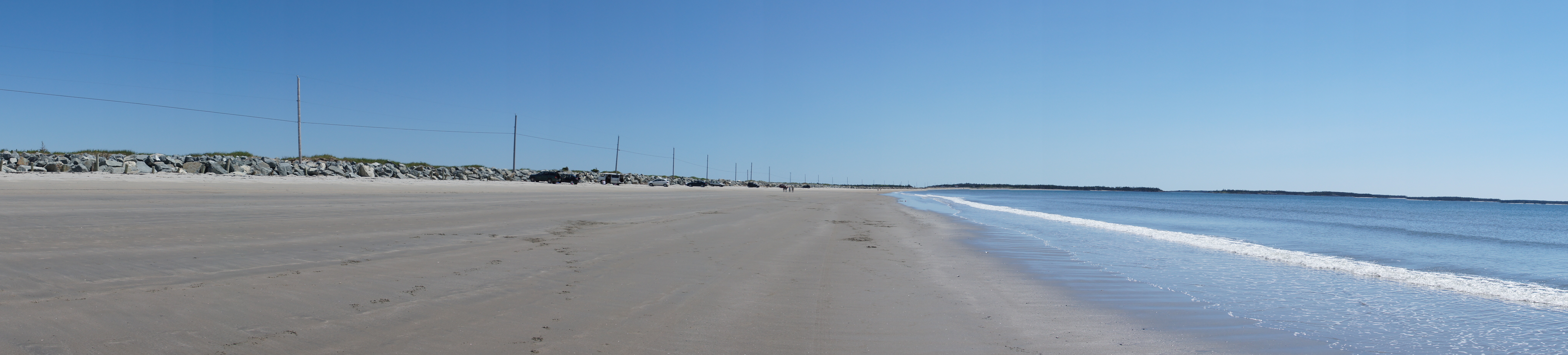
Crescent Beach is a two kilometer ribbon of sand especially popular with walkers.
