= Crescent School =

Crescent School may refer to these:

- Crescent School (Meeker, Oklahoma), in the National Register of Historic Places listings in Oklahoma
- Crescent Elementary School, Sandy, Utah
- Crescent School, Rugby, Warwickshire, England
- Crescent School (Toronto), Toronto, Ontario
- Crescent Girls' School, an all-girls' secondary school in Singapore
- Crescent School (Lobatse), a private educational institution including both primary and secondary levels, based in Botswana
