= Khobar =

Al Khobar الخبر
- City
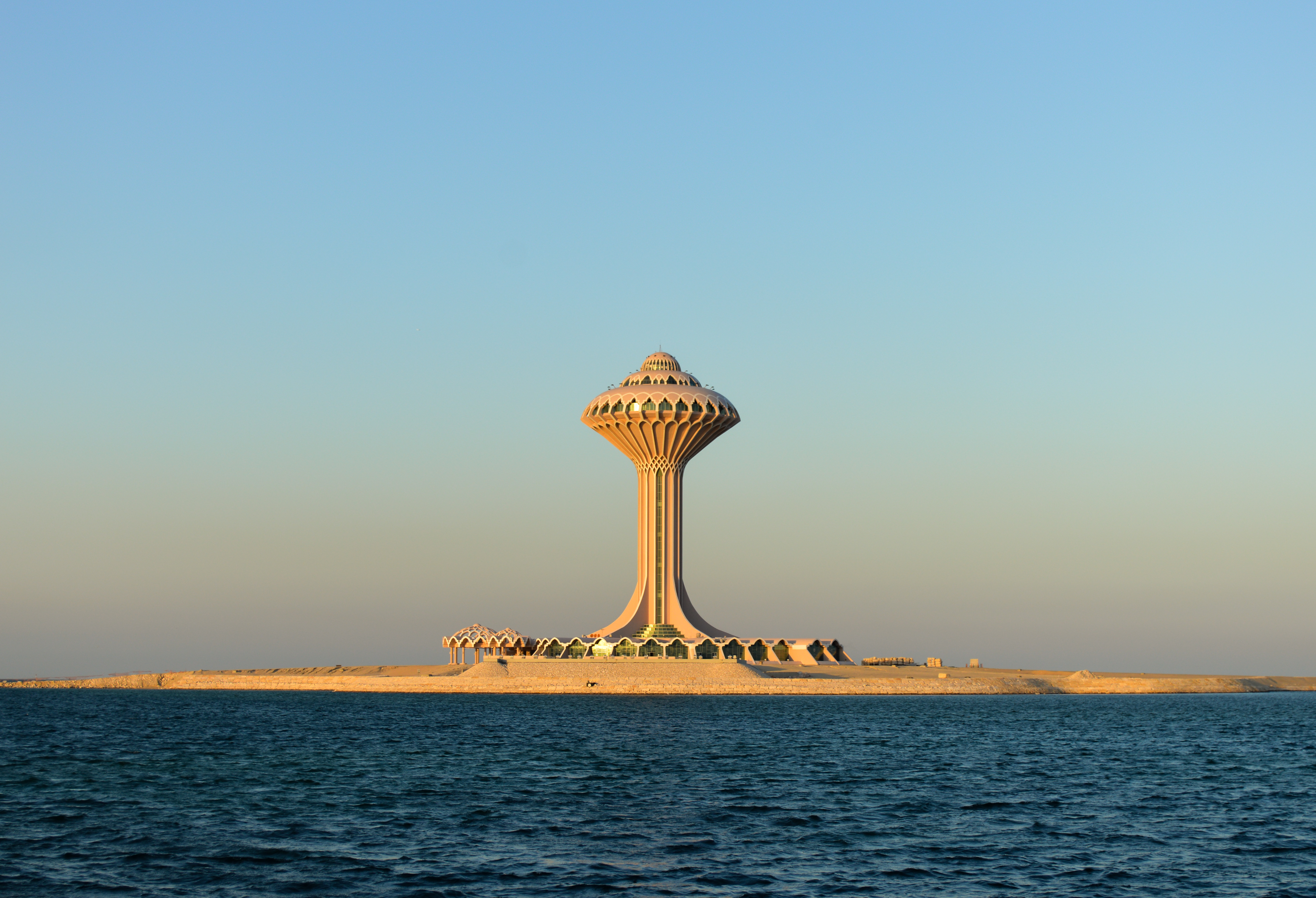
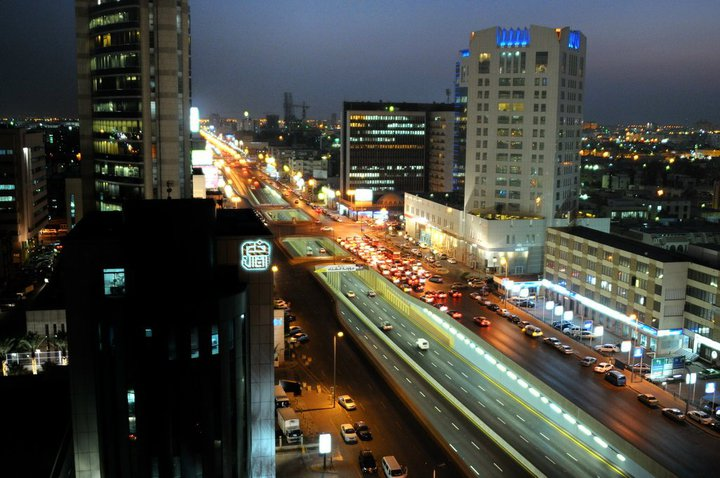
- Interactive map of Al Khobar
- Location within Saudi Arabia
- Coordinates: 26°17′N 50°12′E
- Country: Saudi Arabia
- Province: Eastern Province
- Governorate: Al Khobar Governorate
- First settled: 1923
- Unification of Saudi Arabia: 1932
- Incorporated as a governorate: 1942

Government
  - Body: Municipality of the Al Khobar Governorate
  - Mayor of the Governorate: 'Issam ibn 'Abdullatif al-Mulla
  - Doha: Saud bin Nayef

Area
  - City: 571 km^{2} (220 sq mi)
- Elevation: 10 m (33 ft)

Population (2022)
  - City: 409,549
  - Metro: 658,550
- Time zone: UTC+3 (AST)
- Postal Code: 3XXXX
- Area code: 013-8
- Website: kh-mun.gov.sa

Al Khobar (Arabic: ٱلْخُبَر, romanized: al-Khobar) is a city and governorate in the Eastern Province of the Kingdom of Saudi Arabia, situated on the coast of the Persian Gulf. With a population of 409,549 in the city core and 658,550 in the governorate, as of 2022, Khobar forms part of the Dammam metropolitan area along with Dammam and Dhahran, making up the residential core of Saudi Arabia's Persian Gulf region.

The city was founded alongside Dammam by the Dawasir, who moved there in 1923 fearing British persecution with the permission of King Abdulaziz Al Saud. Khobar experienced rapid growth during and after the discovery of oil in Saudi Arabia as it served as the port for the oil exports of Saudi Aramco in the company's early days. Traditionally, Khobar has also been a city of shopkeepers and merchants, and today has several shopping malls in and around it.

The city is the newest in the Dammam metropolitan area, facing the Persian Gulf with its 16-km long Corniche Road, which runs parallel to the city's eastern coast. Khobar is also considered a resort town as its southern suburbs of the city face the Half Moon Bay and host several beaches and beach resorts. By night, the quiet city turns into a bustling one, with some of the largest malls in the kingdom, such as the Mall of Dhahran and the al-Rashid Mall. The city is also home to the historic Suwaiket Street, officially known as Prince Bandar ibn Abdulaziz Street, which is home to some of the oldest markets in the city. The same could also be said about King Khalid Street and Prince Mohammed Street.

The Khobar governorate is further divided into several municipalities, with Khobar as their capital. 'Issam ibn Abdullatif al-Mulla has been serving as the mayor of the governorate since the Islamic year 1428 AH (2007 CE).

== History ==
The city shares a similar history with Dammam. In the early 1930s, Khobar was mainly a fishing hamlet inhabited by members of the Dawasir tribe, who moved there in 1923, fearing British persecution with the permission of King Abdulaziz. The tribe settled in Khobar for its proximity to Bahrain as they had hoped to return to their homeland. The Khobar Governorate was incorporated in 1942 and with the discovery of oil in nearby areas, a port was built in the southern parts of the modern city to facilitate the export of petroleum to Bahrain.

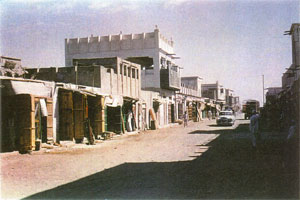
Khobar in 1951

The city quickly transformed into a residential hub and a commercial and industrial port. It soon lost these privileges as commercial operations were transferred to the King Abdulaziz Port in Dammam and the petroleum exports were transferred to Ras Tanura. As a result, Khobar retained its status as the residential core of the area, but over time, its streets slowly became densely packed with markets. Its northern waterfront along the Persian Gulf has been transformed into a corniche, with beaches and resorts to the south on Half Moon Bay.

While most of Khobar's districts are built upon the grid system, unlike Dammam, most of the buildings in the city's main districts are a mix of commercial and residential complexes, with masjids of varied designs and colours adorning its many streets.

Islamist militants carried out attacks in 1996 and 2004.

== Geography ==
=== Climate ===
Khobar has a desert climate (BWh), like the majority of the Saudi Arabian desert under the Köppen climate classification; with very hot, dry summers and mild to warm, dry winters. Light rain with frequent heavy spells and thunderstorms is common during winters and spring; with small episodes of hail taking place during the winters. Much like Dammam, Khobar also experiences the urban heat island effect.

The average annual temperature is 33 °C (91 °F) during the day and 22 °C (72 °F) at night. January is the coldest month with temperatures ranging from 12 to 22 °C (54 to 72 °F) during the day to 3 to 18 °C (37 to 64 °F) at night. In the warmest month, June, the typical temperature ranges from 36 to 50 °C (97 to 122 °F) during the day to about 33 °C (91 °F) at night. Generally, summer lasts about five months, from May to September. Two months, April and October, are transitional, but the transition between seasons is rather quick. Large fluctuations in temperature are rare, particularly in the summer months.

== Transportation ==
=== Air ===
Khobar is served by the largest airport in the world in terms of surface area: King Fahd International Airport. The airport plot is about 77,600 hectares (776 square kilometers) in area, which is slightly bigger than the country of Bahrain. and it is located 20 km (12 mi) northwest of Dammam. From Khobar, the terminal is approximately 50 km (31 mi) away.

=== Road ===
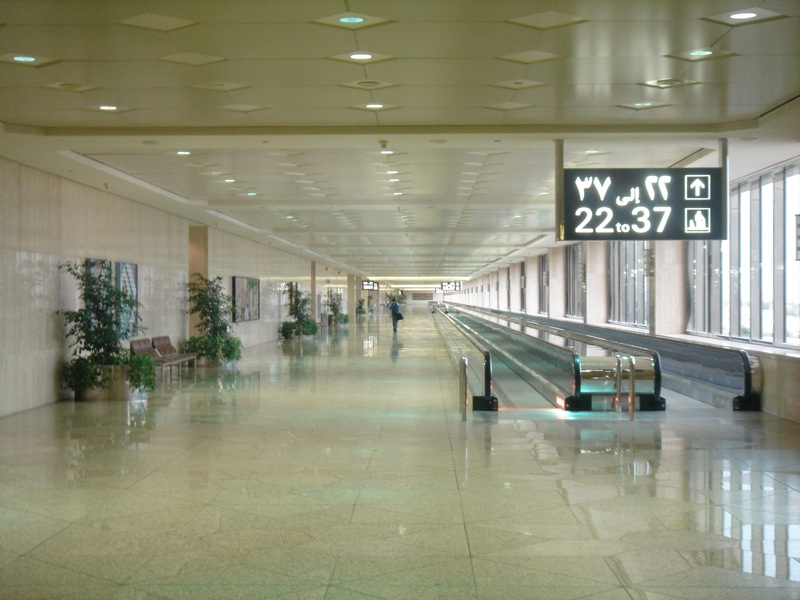
King Fahd International Airport

Khobar is connected with the major highways in the region including the Dhahran–Jubail Expressway, Highway 95 and Highway 605 (also known as the Khobar–Dammam Highway) which links Khobar directly to the King Fahd International Airport via the heart of Dammam. Khobar hosts the King Fahd Causeway, which links Saudi Arabia to Bahrain. Khobar is also connected to highways to other Middle-Eastern countries such as Kuwait, Oman, Qatar and the United Arab Emirates.

=== Sea ===
While the historic port of Khobar was destroyed, a new port is being constructed south of Khobar's South Corniche and is expected to handle civilian port activities.

=== Rail ===
The nearest railway station to Khobar is the Dammam railway station, which offers connections via its 449 km (279 mi) Dammam–Riyadh line to Abqaiq, Hofuf and Riyadh.

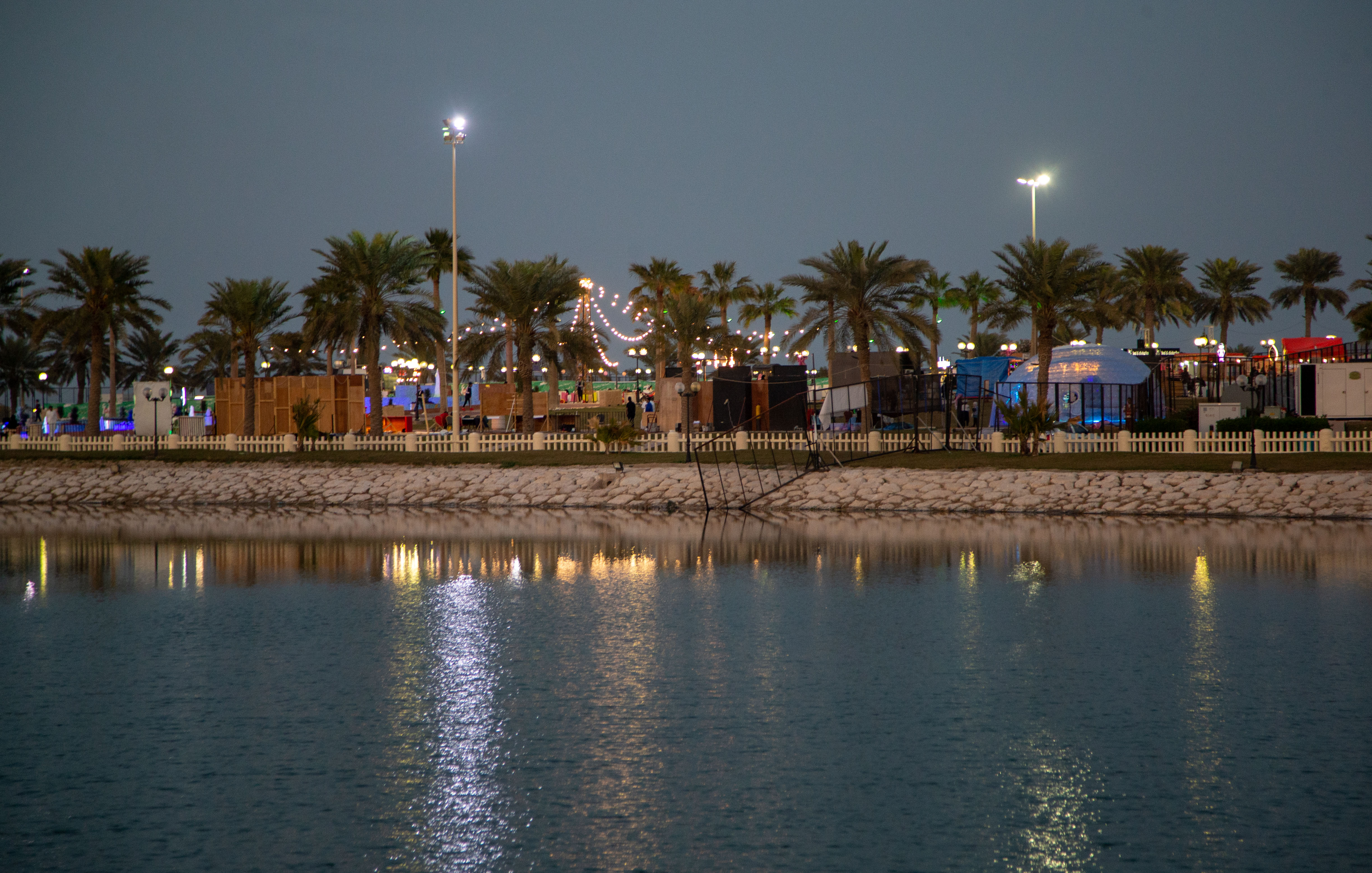
Khobar's North Corniche

== Human resources ==
Khobar is a city with multiple lifestyle centers and shopping malls, The city also has the Corniche which is lined with several international and local chain restaurants, coffee shops, and boutiques of all kinds. People from the neighboring GCC states and from the rest of the country visit the city to do activities such as fishing, scuba diving, water sports, and shopping.

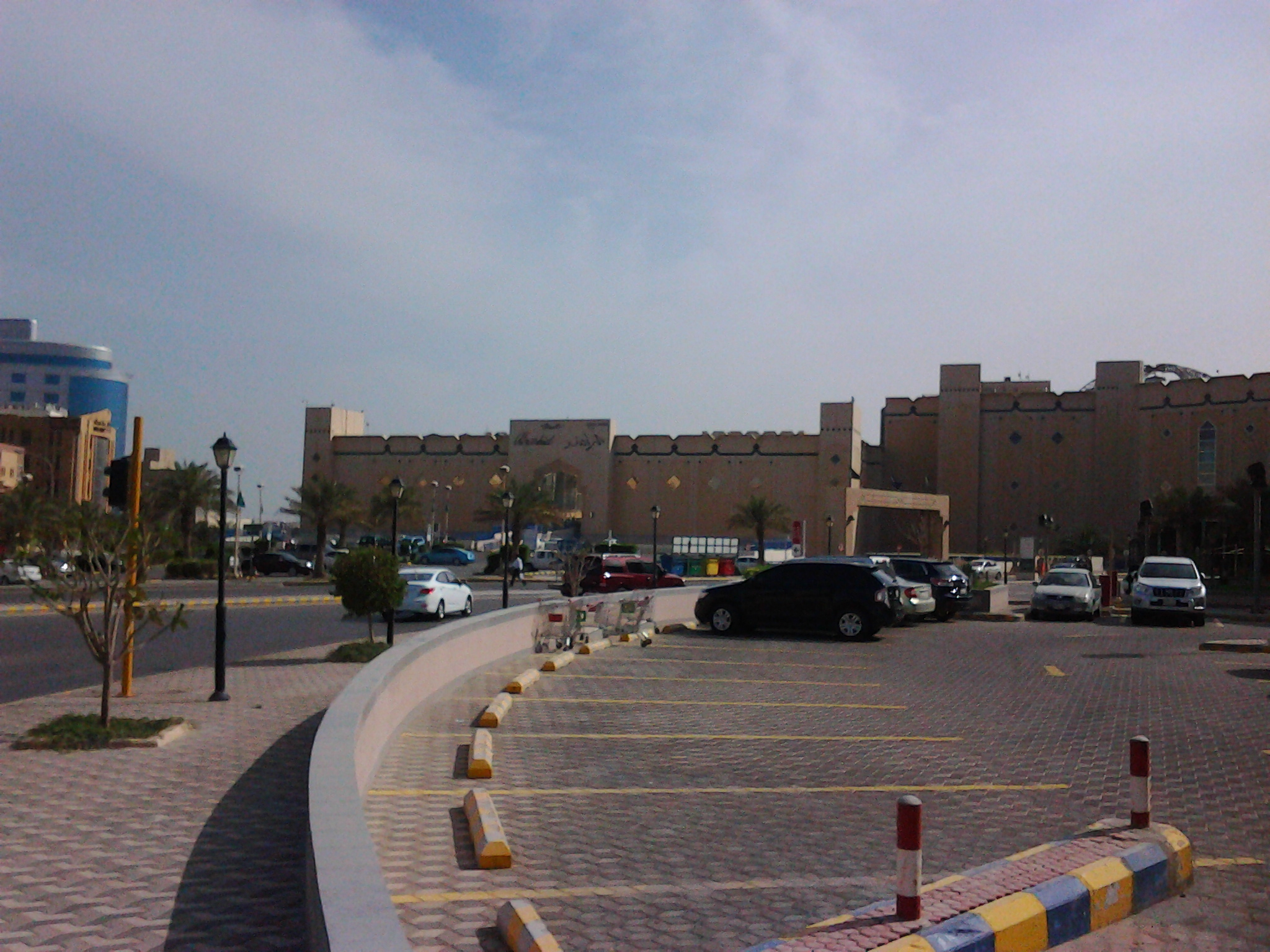
Al Rashid Mall viewed from the east

=== Hospitals ===
Khobar hosts several government-funded public and private hospitals including the Mouwasat Medical Services Al Khobar, AGH Khobar, Mohammad Dossary Hospital (MDH), King Fahd University Hospital (KFUH), and the Dr. Sulaiman Al Habib Hospital.

=== Education ===
The first school in Khobar was established in 1942.

==== Primary and secondary education ====
Today, Khobar is home to more than 100 public and private educational institutes. Saudi Arabian International School Pakistani Section (SAISPS) is one of the most popular and affordable school in Eastern Region for Pakistani community. Indian schools affiliated with the Central Board of Secondary Education (CBSE) are the most common forms of international schools with countries such as Pakistan and Bangladesh also operating their own schools with their own curricula. Private American and British educational institutes are also present. International indian school dammam is also one of the biggest schools in the region.

British International School of Al Khobar is in Khobar. Its attendance dropped around the Gulf War.

==== Higher education ====
King Fahd University of Petroleum and Minerals and Prince Mohammad bin Fahd University are two universities that are located within or close to Khobar. Students may also go to other universities in the city of Dammam.

== Culture ==
=== Natural landmarks ===
Being a residential area, Khobar is famous for its many recreational parks which are decorated with different monuments including Prince Ibn Jalawy Park, Eskan Park.

=== Arts and architecture ===
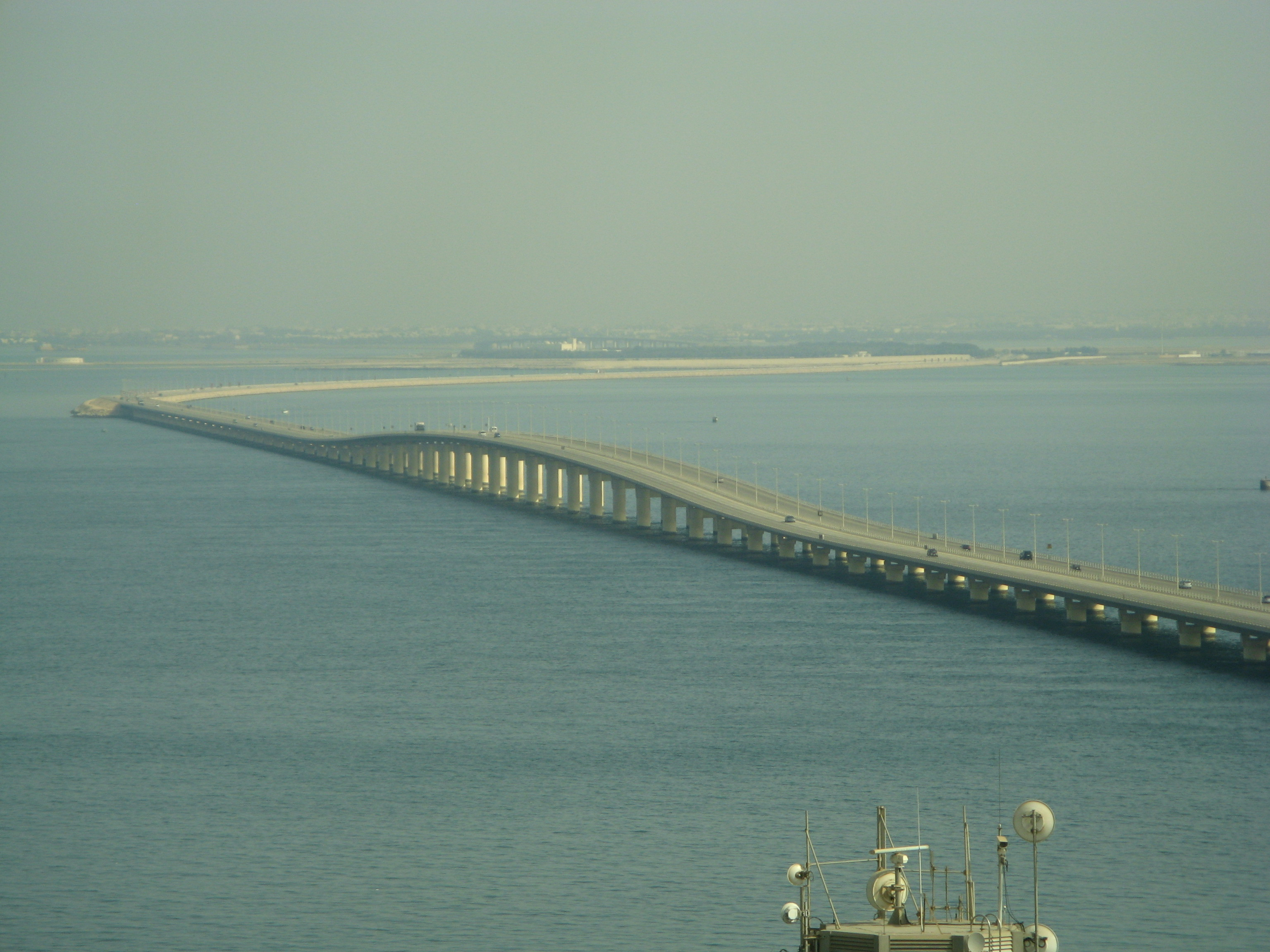
The King Fahd Causeway links the Kingdom of Saudi Arabia to the island nation of Bahrain.

In March 2019, the Sharqiah Season, part of the Saudi Seasons initiative, attracted an estimated 730,000 visitors to multiple cities in the Eastern Province including Khobar under the supervision of the General Authority for Entertainment, with 83 events held across 17 days in 9 cities, celebrating the country's diverse culture, Most notable of the events that took place in Khobar was the Bollywood Festival, designed to attract the city's expatriate majority, featuring Salman Khan. Other artists who participated in the Khobar events of the Sharqiah Season include Tiësto and Sean Paul.

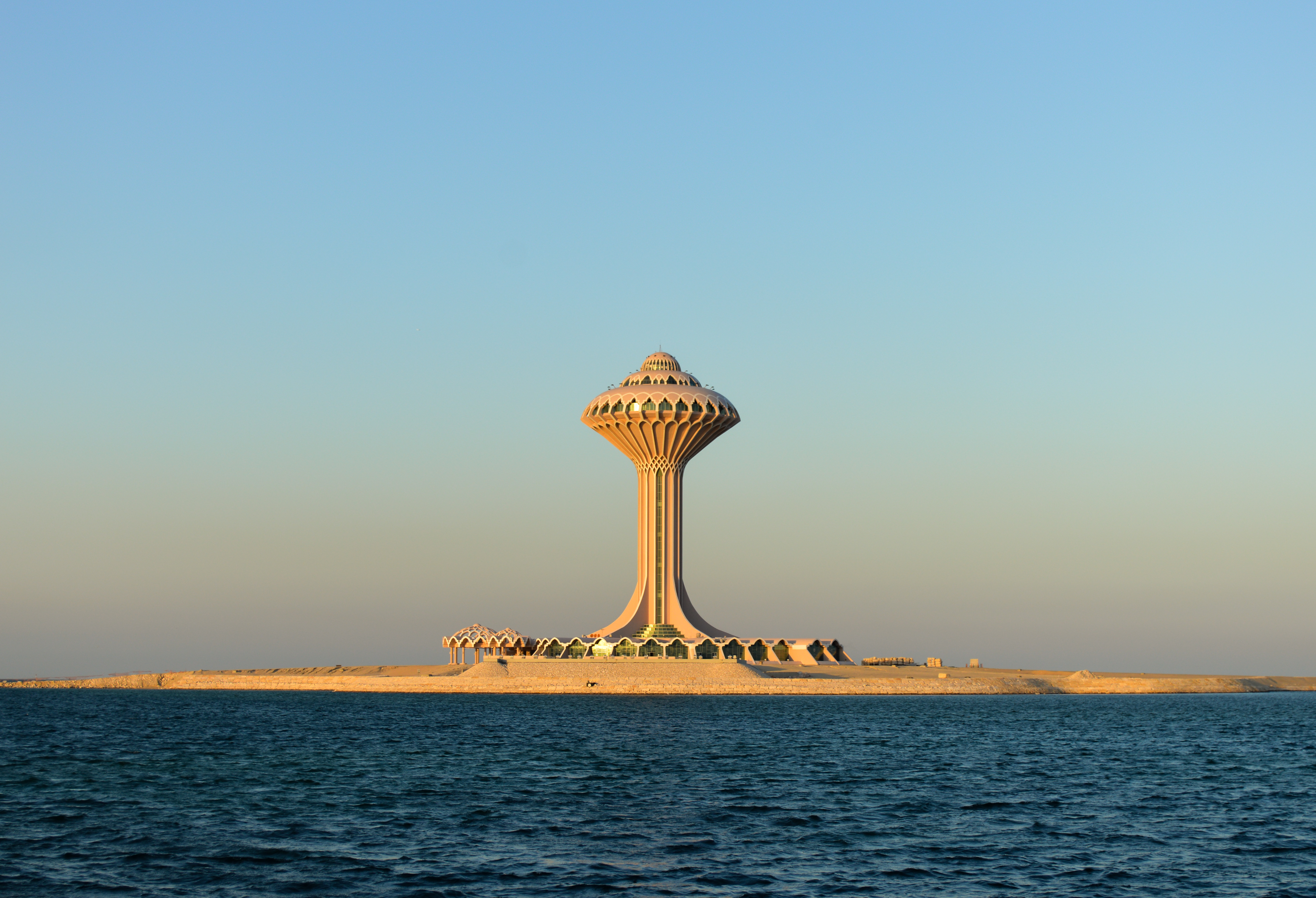
The Khobar Water Tower, located on the Khobar Sea Front, is a major tourist attraction.

The Khobar Corniche is a 16-km stretch of parks and a corniche running parallel to the eastern coast of the city along the Persian Gulf and hosting some of the cities most famous attractions. It has been divided into two parts, the South Corniche and the North Corniche. The King Fahd Causeway is a series of causeways and bridges between Saudi Arabia and the Kingdom of Bahrain. The bridge is about 25 kilometers long from the Saudi toll plaza to the Bahraini toll plaza, and 23.2 meters wide. It was officially opened on 25 November 1986 and is named after King Fahd of Saudi Arabia. The bridge has a maximum capacity of 28,000 cars and 1000 trucks. It has achieved many economic and social benefits for both countries.

The Khobar Water Tower is situated on a man-made peninsula in the northern reaches of the Khobar Corniche. The Khobar Water Tower is a 90 meter tall, eight-story tower, with a revolving restaurant on the top, overlooking the city. It has been called the Eastern Province's "top tourist attraction". The tower hosts fireworks shows on special occasions such as the arrival of Ramadan, Eid al-Fitr and Eid al-Adha. The Prince Sultan Science & Technology Center (also known as SciTech) is a science exhibit located directly in view of the Khobar Water Tower and north of the North Corniche of Khobar. The center has five permanent exhibits, known as Scientific Halls, each dedicated to a different branch of science. The center also hosts an IMAX cinema which generally only shows movies that are scientific and/or non-fictional. The center is open every day of the week from 9 am till 9 pm, except for Friday, where it opens from 4 pm till 9 pm.

== Sports ==
The most popular sport among the Saudis of Khobar is football. The Al-Qadsiah (Saudi Pro League) and the Al-Nahda (Saudi Second Division League) are two of the teams based in Khobar and Dammam, with their home grounds being at Prince Saud bin Jalawi Sports City and Prince Mohammad bin Fahd Stadium, respectively. Expatriates of the city have brought with them several sports, such as cricket, volleyball, badminton, and kho kho, among others.

== See also ==
- Al-Rakah Antiquities
- Eastern Province
- Dammam
- Dhahran
- King Fahd Causeway
- Saudi Investment Bank Tower
