= Crescent Arts Centre =

Art centre in Belfast, Northern Ireland

Coordinates: 54.5878°N 5.9352°W

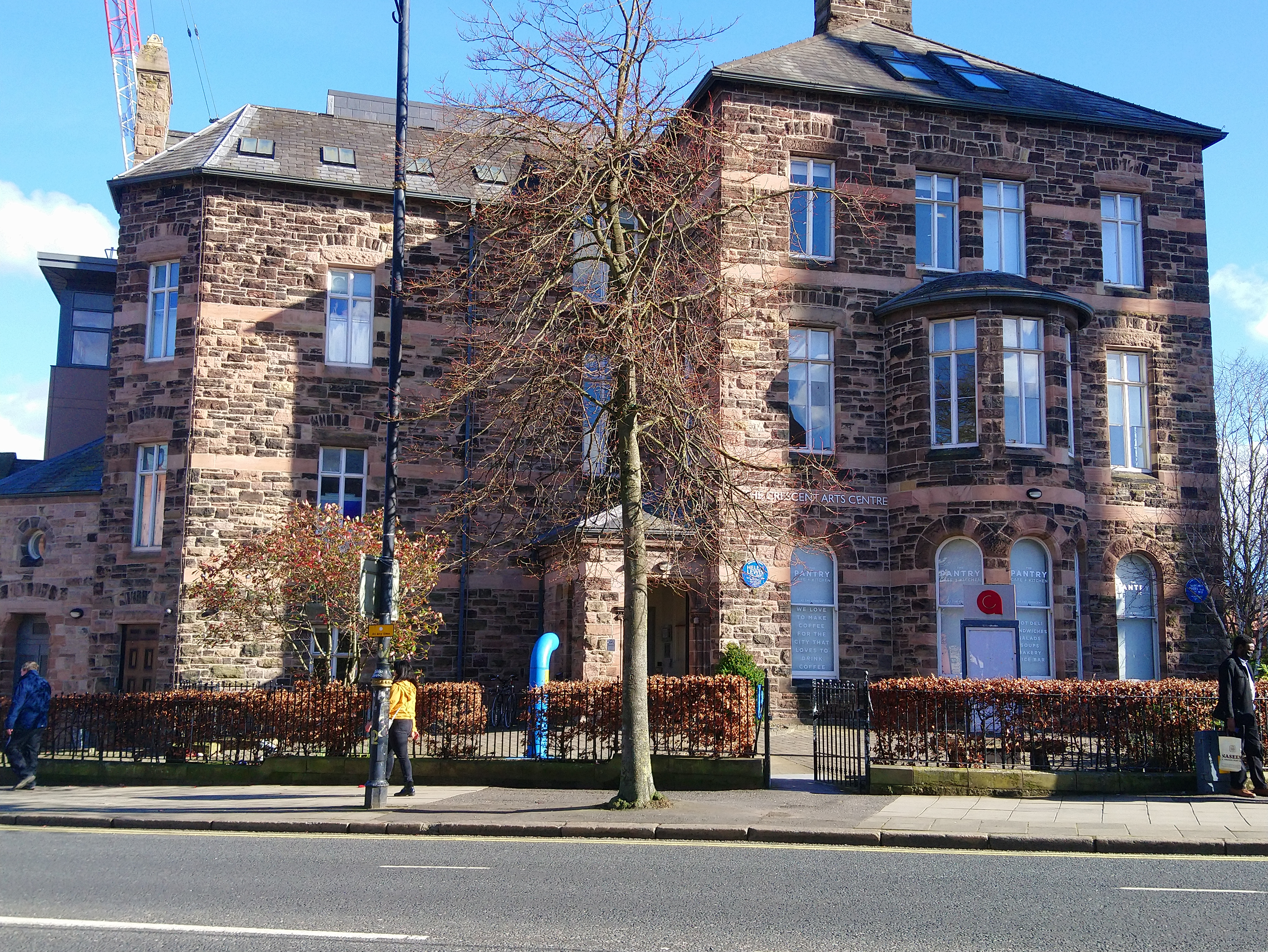
The Crescent Arts Centre in 2021

The Crescent Arts Centre (or simply The Crescent) is an arts centre based in Belfast, Northern Ireland, founded in 1980. The centre hosts a wide range of arts and entertainment events, as well as classes in dance, music, verbal and visual arts, and community outreach programmes. Its facilities include a dance studio named after its late patron, the choreographer and Holocaust survivor Helen Lewis. The centre is home to the annual June Belfast Book Festival.

The Crescent is housed in the former Victoria College on University Road in the Queens Conservation Area. The current patron of the centre is Paul Muldoon.

== Refurbishment ==
The Victorian-era listed building was extensively refurbished between 2008 and 2010. In September 2008, then Minister of Culture Arts and Leisure, Gregory Campbell, announced the awarding of capital funding to allow refurbishment of the University Road site to get underway. The total cost would be £7.2million. The Department of Culture, Arts and Leisure provided £4.5million; the Arts Council of Northern Ireland £1.45million; the Heritage Lottery Fund £447,000; and the then Environment and Heritage Service £525,900. The Crescent itself contributed £236,000 and has appointed fundraising consultants to raise the rest.
