= List of hāfu in popular culture =

Hāfu (ハーフ, "half") is a Japanese word that describes an individual who is the child of one Japanese and one non-Japanese. This list consists of hāfu characters in popular culture.

The list presents film, television, animation, comics, literature and video game hāfu characters from Western and Japanese media.

== Western media ==
=== Film and television ===
- Vincent Chase from Entourage (2004-2011)
- Edna Mode from The Incredibles franchise
- Buckaroo Banzai from The Adventures of Buckaroo Banzai Across the 8th Dimension (1984)
- Clark in Rhapsody in August (1991)
- Phoebe Heyerdahl in Hey Arnold! (1996-2004)
- Reagan Ridley from Inside Job (2021-2022)
- Hiro Hamada and Tadashi Hamada from the Big Hero 6 franchise
- Kyo Kusanagi from The King of Fighters (2010)
- O-Ren Ishii and Sofie Fatale from Kill Bill: Volume 1 (2003)
- Milo Powell from Captain Flamingo (2006-2010)
- Junichiro from King of the Hill (1997-2009)
- Brook Soso from Orange is the New Black (2013-2019)
- Paxton Hall-Yoshida from Never Have I Ever (2020-2023)
- Kai (half Japanese, half British) from 47 Ronin (2013)

- Yuki Yoshimido from Wasabi (2001)
- Jaden Shiba, Kevin, Mike, Emily, Antonio Garcia and Lauren Shiba from the Power Rangers franchise
- Molly O'Brien and Kirayoshi O'Brien from the Star Trek franchise
- Maya Ishii-Peters from PEN15 (2019-2021)
- Mizu from Blue Eye Samurai (2023)

=== Comic books ===
==== Marvel Comics ====
- Akihiro
- Colleen Wing
- Ghost Rider 2099
- J2
- Kid Kaiju
- Peni Parker
- Shinobi Shaw

==== DC Comics ====
- Emiko Queen
- Karate Kid

==== Other Publishers ====
- Shi

=== Literature ===
- Takeshi Kovacs from the Altered Carbon franchise
- James Suzuki, the son of James Bond and Kissy Suzuki from the James Bond series
- Rei Shimura from Sujata Massey's Rei Shimura series
- Jane Takagi-Little from My Year of Meats and Yumi Fuller, from All Over Creation, two novels by Ruth Ozeki
- Masaaki and Luna in Asako Serizawa’s Inheritors

=== Video games ===
- Kenshi Takahashi and Takeda Takahashi from the Mortal Kombat franchise
- Ryo Watanabe from the Need for Speed franchise

== Japanese media ==
Various studies indicate that the success of Japanese manga could be partially attributed to their characters’ ‘mixed look’; the following list, however, only contains characters who are explicitly designed as hāfu.

=== Anime, manga and light novels ===
- Sylia Stingray (Japanese-British), Priscilla Asagiri (Japanese-American) and Nene Romanova (Japanese-Russian) from Bubblegum Crisis
- Kousuke Misaki (Japanese-British) from Tomo-chan Is a Girl!
- Roberto Hongo (Japanese-Brazilian) from Captain Tsubasa
- Ryo Asuka from Devilman
- Jou Yokosuka from Rainbow: Nisha Rokubō no Shichinin
- Lan Asuka from Devil Lady
- Eira Kaho (half-Brazilian) from The 100 Girlfriends Who Really, Really, Really, Really, Really Love You
- L Lawliet (25% Japanese) and Raye Penber (American father) from Death Note
- Mikasa Ackerman from Attack on Titan
- Eli Ayase (25% Russian) from Love Live! School Idol Project
- Erika Campbell from Lemon Angel Project
- Ira Gamagoori (American father) from Kill la Kill
- Tsuna Sawada, Mukuro Rokudo and Hayato Gokudera from Reborn!
- Langa Hasegawa (Canadian father) from SK8 the Infinity
- Ai Haibara (British mother), Shukichi Haneda, Masumi Sera and Shuichi Akai from Case Closed
- Isami Aldini (Italian mother), Takumi Aldini (Italian mother) and Nakiri Alice (Danish mother) from Food Wars!: Shokugeki no Soma
- Jotaro Kujo (British-Italian mother), Josuke Higashikata (British father), Giorno Giovanna (British father) and Jolyne Cujoh (Italian-American mother) from JoJo's Bizarre Adventure
- Charles Bernard (French Descent) From Jujutsu Kaisen
- Momo Nishimiya (American father) From Jujutsu Kaisen
- Rio Kazumiya from Sound of the Sky
- Taichi Hiraga-Keaton from Master Keaton
- Cygnus Hyōga (Russian mother) from Saint Seiya
- Pegasus Tenma from Saint Seiya: The Lost Canvas
- Chiho Johansson (Swedish father) from Gigant
- Urara Kasugano from Yes! PreCure 5
- Sentarō Kawabuchi from Kids on the Slope
- Asuka Langley Soryu (German-Japanese mother and American father) from Neon Genesis Evangelion
- Lupin III (French grandfather) from Lupin the Third
- Clarissa Satsuki Maezono from HoneyComing
- Louie Nishiwaki (African-American mother) from Dark Edge
- Mari Ohara (Italian-American father) from Love Live! Sunshine!!
- Rin Okumura from Blue Exorcist
- Lev Haiba (unspecified Russian parent) from Haikyu!!
- Elena Amamiya (Mexican Father) from Star Twinkle PreCure
- Lucyna "Lucy" Kushinada (Polish mother) from Cyberpunk: Edgerunners
- Mario Rossi (Sicilian-American father) from Mario
- Suo Pavlichenko from Darker than Black
- Yasutora "Chad" Sado (unspecified parent of Mexican descent) from Bleach
- Claudine Saijō (French mother) from Revue Starlight
- Eriri Spencer Sawamura from Saekano
- Layla "Reira" Serizawa from Nana
- Kallen Stadtfeld from Code Geass
- Tamaki Suoh (French mother) from Ouran High School Host Club
- Takumi Usui (25% British) Maid Sama!
- Eve Wakamiya from BanG Dream!
- Chris Yukine from Symphogear
- Tōta Konoe (English grandfather) from UQ Holder!
- Thomas H. Norstein (Half-Austrian) from Digimon Data Squad
- Yuta Sakurai (Half-British) from Recovery of an MMO Junkie
- Chrome, Kohaku, and the rest of Ishigami Village from Dr. Stone
- Jack Hanma from Baki the Grappler
- Mikaela Hyakuya (Russian father) from Seraph of the End
- Chitoge Kirisaki from Nisekoi
- Mamori Anezaki (American grandparent) from Eyeshield 21
- Rebecca Miyamoto (American mother) from Pani Poni
- Inoue Aran from Rurouni Kenshin: The Hokkaido Arc
- Urumi Kanzaki from Great Teacher Onizuka
- Jun Kamata, Kaoru Kamata, and Natsuki Smith-Mizuki from Shonan Junai Gumi
- Angelica Karasuma from Hitomi-chan is Shy With Strangers
- Tokiomi Tohsaka (Finnish mother) from Fate/Zero
- Alisa Mikhailovna Kujou / Alya (Russian father) and Maria Mikhailovna Kujou / Masha (Russian father) from Alya Sometimes Hides Her Feelings in Russian
- Sakuya Sumeragi from Code Geass: Rozé of the Recapture
- Sowande Sakaki in Keep Your Hands off Eizouken!, one of the first African-Japanese as main character in manga

=== Film and television ===
- Peggy Matsuyama (Swiss father) from Himitsu Sentai Gorenger (1975-1977)
- Vito Hayakawa (half-Filipino) from Smile (2009)

=== Literature ===
- Kazu and Mitch, in Wildcat Dome by Yuko Tsushima

==== Video games ====
- Ken Masters (American grandfather), Sean Matsuda (Brazilian mother) and Laura Matsuda (Brazilian mother) from the Street Fighter series
- Lars Alexandersson (Swedish mother) from the Tekken series
- Anastasia (Russian father), Frederica Miyamoto (Italian father), Elena Shimabara and Meguru Hachimiya (American mother) from The Idolmaster series
- Kazuhira Miller (American father) and Samuel Rodrigues (Brazilian mother & paternal grandmother) from the Metal Gear series
- Ann Takamaki (American parent) from the Persona series
- Setsuka (Portuguese father) from the Soulcalibur series
- Aya Brea (American father) from Parasite Eve
- Hitomi (German father) from the Dead or Alive series
- Jinako Carigiri (German father) from Fate/EXTRA CCC
- Rin Tohsaka (25% European), Sakura Matou (25% European) and Illyasviel von Einzbern (German mother) from Fate/Stay Night
- Ciel (French father) from Tsukihime Remake
- Kurisu Makise (American mother) from Steins;Gate
- Haruka Morishima (British grandfather) from Amagami
- Masayoshi Tanimura (Half-Thai mother) from Yakuza 4

=== Dolls ===
- Licca-chan, a "Japanese Barbie" designed to portray a mixed-race character

== See also ==
- Half Is More, a manga focusing on half-Japanese characters
- Mixed-blood Karekore, a Japanese web-series with fantastical "mixed-blood" (Konketsu) characters
- Inuyasha, a Japanese manga series whose half-demon characters have been said to address the issue of Japanese mixed race people
- Hafu (film), a documentary on real Half-Japanese people
