= Half (disambiguation) =

One half is an irreducible fraction resulting from dividing one by two.

Half may also refer to:

- half.com, a website run by eBay that sells books, movies, video games, music, etc.
- Halves (band), an Irish post-rock band
- Halving, the operation of division by two
- A half precision floating point representation in computer sciences
- "A half", a half pint of an alcoholic beverage
- "Half", a song by Pvris from All We Know of Heaven, All We Need of Hell
- "Half", a song by Soundgarden from Superunknown
- Other half, an affectionate term for a member of an intimate relationship
- A person being one half Japanese, and one half gaijin
- Half (EP), a 2015 EP by Joker Xue

== See also ==
- Hafu (disambiguation)
- Second (disambiguation)
