= Bubblegum Crash =

1991 original video animation series

- US DVD cover

バブルガムクラッシュ (Baburugamu Kurasshu)
- Genre: Cyberpunk
- Created by: Toshimichi Suzuki
- Original video animation

Bubblegum Crash!
- Directed by: Hiroshi Ishiodori; Hiroyuki Fukushima
- Produced by: Toshimichi Suzuki
- Written by: Emu Arii
- Music by: Takehito Nakazawa; Michihiko Oota
- Studio: Artmic & Artland
- Licensed by: NA: AnimEigo; UK: Manga Entertainment
- Released: May 25, 1991 – December 21, 1991
- Runtime: 140 minutes (total): 47 minutes (#1); 44 minutes (#2); 49 minutes (#3)
- Episodes: 3
- Related works
- Bubblegum Crash!
- icon

Bubblegum Crash (バブルガムクラッシュ!, Baburugamu Kurasshu!) is a 1991 OVA anime series produced by Artmic and Artland. It is the sequel to the 1987 OVA series Bubblegum Crisis, taking place a year after the series. The Knight Sabers seem to be finished, as each of its members except Nene Romanova have seemingly drifted off to pursue their own goals. But at the same time, a recent string of robberies, murders, and Boomer malfunctions begin to occur. Knight Sabers' leader Sylia Stingray is then forced to recruit Nene and the other members back together. The group tries to find out who or what is behind the recent string of crimes which are somehow related to the creation of an advanced artificial intelligence.

After the split between Artmic and Youmex, Artmic proceeded to make Bubblegum Crash on their own, which ran three OVA episodes and is conjectured that it was a shortened version of how Bubblegum Crisis was to end. Youmex then sued Artmic, cutting the series short and tying the franchise up in legal issues until the late 1990s, when Artmic went bankrupt and Youmex was absorbed into Toshiba EMI.

Upon release, the series received mixed reviews from fans and critics.

== Plot ==
Bubblegum Crash takes place in 2034, one year after the events of Bubblegum Crisis. The Knight Sabers have broken up, as each of its members have moved on to pursue their own life goals as things seemed to have calmed down. Knight Sabers leader and founder Sylia Stingray has disappeared. The group's number two, Japanese-American musician Priscilla "Priss" Asagiri, has stumbled from one manager to another. Nene Romanova, the IT expert of the Knight Sabers, is still working with the AD Police and trying to keep the Knight Saber ideal alive, and Linna Yamazaki has moved into playing the Japanese stock market and has gotten rich as a result. Things are quiet, until a group of mercenaries called the Illegal Army begin attacking tech companies across Tokyo, and they steal rare parts from them. As a result, Sylia is forced to bring Nene and the other members back together. They then try to find out who or what is behind the recent string of robberies, murders, and Boomer malfunctions caused by the Illegal Army which are related to the creation of an advanced artificial intelligence.

== Characters ==
The characters are similar to those in the Bubblegum Crisis OVA series.

Sylia Stingray (シリア・スティングレイ, Shiria Sutingurei) (spelled Silia in Bubblegum Crisis)

Sylia is the 22-year-old ringleader of the Knight Sabers. She is a Hafu of British descent. Very calm and cool-headed, she does not show much emotion. She is the daughter of Dr. Katsuhito Stingray, the man who originally created the boomers. Sylia is a wealthy businesswoman whose business ventures, aside from the mercenaries' fee, finance the team. Her primary business is the lingerie shop "Silky Doll" she personally runs, housed in her private building, Lady's 633, on whose top is also her penthouse apartment functioning as the Knight Sabers' base of operations. She wears a blue and silver Hard Suit equipped with retractable sword blades in the forearms, laser cannons in the palms and wings for full flight capability.

Priscilla "Priss" S. Asagiri (プリシラ・S・アサギリ, Purishira S. Asagiri; プリス Purisu)

Priss is the strongest member of the Knight Sabers, specializing in heavy assault. The Japanese-American vocalist of an underground rock band, Priss is an orphan of the 2025 Kantō earthquake, who joined a biker gang. After her boyfriend was killed and his death declared insignificant by the police (giving her a dislike for the law enforcement), she attempted to hunt down the killers, but she was recruited into the Knight Sabers instead. She wears a dark blue Hard Suit, which features a railgun in the right hand as well as a laser gun in the original series and her signature knuckle bombers (explosive charges in both hands of her hard suit). In Crash, her suit becomes a modular core system to which a variety of selective heavy weapons can be attached.

Linna Yamazaki (リンナ山崎, Rinna Yamazaki)

Linna is a member of the Knight Sabers. She is the only member of the Sabers that is not a Hafu. Linna dons a green Hard Suit equipped with "ribbon cutters", which are long, electrically charged nanomolecular ropes mounted behind the helmet that can be used to slash through Boomers and other high-tech opponents. Like Priss, she is also armed with explosive knuckle bombers as well as a finger-mounted triplet laser gun. In Crash, the knuckle bombers and lasers are replaced with electrically charged twin wire-daggers. Working as an aerobics instructor, Linna once hoped to pursue a career in professional dancing, but her efforts went unappreciated by all but Sylia, who recruited her into the Sabers. Eventually, her constant greed makes her switch to stockbroker consulting in Crash.

Nene Romanova (ネネ・ロマノーヴァ, Nene Romanōva)

Nene is the youngest member of the Knight Sabers, acting as the IT expert of the group and as an officer of the AD Police, functioning as the group's mole in the ADP. She is a Hāfu of Russian descent. She is bubbly, naive, has an affinity for candy and junk food, and is blissfully inept with real world logic. Due to her lack of (and unwillingness to engage in) regular exercise, she is often teased by Priss and Linna for not being more physically durable. Nene's blue and pink Hard Suit's offensive weapon is a laser gun unsuited for taking out enemies; instead, it is used to scribble the Knight Sabers' signature onto their scene of actions. She relies on her suit's computer and electronic warfare systems to stay away from an enemy. She gets another new suit in Crash. Her suit's offensive capabilities are stocked up considerably with an electromagnetic pulse striker and the capability of physically hacking into a Boomer's computer brain.

Leon McNichol

An A.D. Police officer from America, Leon is a dedicated cop with a tendency to rush in without thinking. He is a skilled powered armor pilot, one of the A.D. Police's aces in its K-11 and K-12S powered suits. Leon has a crush on Priss, which she does not like since she has a grudge against the A.D. Police.

Daley Wong

Daley is Leon's partner and a highly skilled investigator. He is Chinese-American and openly homosexual. He flirts openly with the heterosexual Leon whenever Leon's temper tends to get the better of him, and Leon often reciprocates with good humor.

== Episodes ==
No.	Title	Japanese release date	English release date
1	"Illegal Army"	May 25, 1991	November 14, 1991
One evening, a gang of robbers decked out in advanced powered suits rob Glory Bank. AD Police attempts to apprehend them, but air support arrives too late to prevent them escaping in their own helicopter. At a coffee shop, Leon and Daley discuss what has become of the Knight Sabers. The disappearance of Sylia is of great concern to Nene, but Priss and Linna do not seem to care. The powered suits then commit a second robbery, clearly taking something else besides gold. Sylia reemerges from hiding and recruits Priss, Linna, and Nene for another job. She explains their current contract: Zone Corporation, makers of Boomer brains, have hired them to safeguard the last two components of their newly-developed, top secret AI from theft by the Illegal Army, who have been robbing the banks where the components were concealed. Sylia has planted false information concerning the whereabouts of one of the components, and is waiting for the Illegal Army to take the bait.
2	"Geo Climbers"	July 25, 1991	February 15, 1992
At Zone's research center, Dr. Haynes, continuing the Boomer research of Sylia's father, Katsuhito Stingray, is working on a second-generation Boomer utilizing the new AI. The project, named "Adama," is the first step toward Dr. Stingray's dream of constructing Boomers that closely resemble mankind. But Dr. Stingray's other disciple, Dr. Yuri, murders Haynes and steals Adama. Later, at the Zone testing grounds, Yuri demonstrates the EM-302, a high-mobility combat Boomer he developed by perverting what he learned from Stingray and Haynes. It becomes clear that he is working in cahoots with the Illegal Army, who lusts after the secrets of the new AI. Sylia learns that Dr. Yuri stole Adama, and dispatches Priss, Linna and Nene to recover him, but Priss declines. However, Priss meets up with an escaping Adama shortly after.
3	"Melt Down"	December 21, 1991	April 15, 1992
A virus mysteriously infects all boomers, making them go rogue. It all culminates in a showdown between Sylia and Largo (also known as Brian J. Mason), who has come back from the dead again to challenge the Knight Sabers. After his defeat and death at the hands of the Knight Sabers, Largo substituted half his body for machinery, transforming himself into a Boomer, and completing his journey into megalomania. Sylia musters the strength of her fellow Knight Sabers, with the fate of Megatokyo and that of mankind hanging in the balance.

== Cast ==
Cast
Character		Japanese	English	
Character		Japanese	Southwynde Studios (1995)	World Wide Group (1996)
Sylia Stingray		Yoshiko Sakakibara	Jemila Ericson	Tamsin Hollo (as Louise Russell)
Priscilla "Priss" Asagiri		Ryouko Tachikawa	Sinda Nichols	Julia Brahms
Linna Yamazaki		Michie Tomizawa	Elizabeth Becka	Stacey Gregg
Nene Romanova		Akiko Hiramatsu	Susan Grillo	Barbara Barnes
Leon McNichol		Toshio Furukawa	Brad Moranz	Matthew Sharp
Daley Wong		Ken'yuu Horiuchi	Marshall Carroll	Michael Magee
Largo		Kazuyuki Sogabe	Pierre Brulatour	Ralgo
Largo		Kazuyuki Sogabe	Pierre Brulatour	Stuart Milligan
1	Bogarde	Kiyoyuki Yanada	Scott Simpson	Colin Bruce
1	Waitress Boomer	Takako Kikuchi	Jenny Moranz	Barbara Barnes
1	A.D. Police Chief	Akira Murayama	Matt Sullivan	
1	Manager (1)	Kiyonobu Suzuki	Marc Garber	Stuart Milligan
1	DJ Tommy	Kiyonobu Suzuki	Stan Norman	
1	Colonel Lando	Tarou Arakawa	Phil Loch	Douglas Blackwell
2	Dr. Haynes	Tomomichi Nishimura	Sam Burke	William Roberts
2	Dr. Yuri	Hideyuki Umezu	Gray Sibley	
2	Detective	Wataru Takagi	Grenoldo Frazier	
2	Announcer		Patt Noday	
2	Soldier	Takkou Ishimori	Basile Katsikis	
2	Adama	Minami Takayama	Loren Mash	John Stefaniuk
2	Street Kid	Takkou Ishimori	Noah Shane	Colin Bruce
2	Mechanic		Lou Criscuolo	
3	Foreman	Nobuaki Sekine	Basile Katsikis	
3	Mackie Stingray	Nozomu Sasaki	Frank Trimble	Adam Henderson
3	Youth	Wataru Takagi	Nicholas Michaels	
3	A.D. Police Officer	Toshiyuki Morikawa	Noah Shane	
3	Boomer	Norio Tsuboi	Zaharoula Katsikis	
3	Power Plant Chief	Ichirou Murakoshi	Chuck Kinlaw	
3	Manager (2)			Colin Bruce

=== Additional voices ===
Japanese: Norio Tsukui, Takako Kikuchi, Toshiyuki Morikawa

English (Southwynde Studios): Amanda Tancredi, Chuck Kinlaw, Grenoldo Frazier, Jack Bowden, Lou Criscuolo, Matthew Alexander, Michael Sinterniklaas, Scott Simpson, Sean Clay, Sophia Tolar, Steve Vernon, Zach Hanner

== Release ==
The video game Bubblegum Crash!, for the PC Engine was released in Japan based on the OVA series on December 6, 1991.

== Reception ==
Critical reception of Bubblegum Crash has been mixed. Both critics and fans consider it to be a downgrade compared to Bubblegum Crisis and its reboot Tokyo 2040.

Raphael See of THEM Anime Reviews gave Crash a rating of 3 out of 5 stars, praising the artwork and character development, but criticized the designs of the Boomers, as well as noting that "the biggest complaint that fans have against Crash is that it doesn't live up to the tone or flavor of Crisis. That much is true - Bubblegum Crash takes itself MUCH less seriously than Crisis. Less charitable critics sometimes call Crash 'Sailor Moon in Hardsuits.'" Overall, See concludes that Crash is not bad, but that "die-hard Crisis fans will probably want to stay away."

Christopher Macdonald of Anime News Network gave the series a rating of C+, handing out praise for the artwork, animation, and some of the story, but criticized the lighter tone of the series compared to Bubblegum Crisis, the soundtrack, and for not keeping continuity in the Knight Sabers' personalities between the original and the sequel. He states that "it isn't as good as Crisis, but it's still not that bad. However, sequels are never judged exclusively on their own merits; they are judged in comparison with the original, and Crash simply doesn't have the character of Crisis."
