= Hafu (disambiguation) =

Hāfu is a Japanese language term used to refer to an individual born to one ethnic Japanese and one non-Japanese parent.

Hafu may also refer to:

- Hafu (film), a 2013 documentary about mixed-race, half Japanese people in Japan
- Hafu (gamer) (born 1991), American video game player
- Hafu, a fictional character from the Bionicle franchise produced by Lego
- Ha'afuasia, a village in Wallis
- Hafun, a town in Somalia
