= The Book of Form and Emptiness =

2021 novel by Ruth Ozeki

- First edition (US)
- Author: Ruth Ozeki
- Cover artist: Jon Gray
- Language: English
- Genre: Magical realism
- Publisher: Viking (US); Canongate Books (UK)
- Publication date: September 21, 2021
- Publication place: USA
- Pages: 560pp
- ISBN: 9781838855277
- OCLC: 1287597597
- Dewey Decimal: 813.6
- LC Class: PS3565.Z45 B66

The Book of Form and Emptiness is a novel by American author Ruth Ozeki, published in 2021 by Viking. Ozeki's fourth novel, the book won the 2022 Women's Prize for Fiction. The story follows a boy who hears voices from inanimate objects while the narrative explores themes of mental illness and bereavement.

== Background ==
The novel was partially inspired by Zen Buddhism. A question from a Zen parable; "do insentient beings speak the dharma?” formed the central theme of the narrative. The death of Ozeki's father also shaped the book. Ozeki took eight years to write the book.

The library that plays a central role in the story is based on Vancouver Public Library. Ozeki previously spent time in the system's central branch researching her 1998 debut novel, My Year of Meats.

== Summary ==
Following the death of his father, Benny Oh, an American boy of Japanese-Korean descent, begins hearing voices calling out from inanimate objects. Oh's relationship with his mother, a media monitor and hoarder, deteriorates, and he begins spending time in a public library, befriending a group of outsiders including an artist and a poet.

The story is mostly narrated by the book itself. Some sections of the novel are narrated by Oh.

== Reception ==
The novel received mixed reviews. The Guardian praised Ozeki's "calm, dry, methodical good humour and wit". The Washington Post described the narrative as "cluttered" but also described the book as "compelling". The Daily Telegraph described the book as "a preachy, whimsical mess".

== Awards ==
- Women's Prize for Fiction.
