= List of Bubblegum Crisis characters =

The following is a list of characters from the Japanese anime franchise Bubblegum Crisis. The main protagonists in the series are the Knight Sabers, a group of four young female mercenaries protecting the futuristic MegaTokyo from the threat posed by Genom, a corrupt corporation bent on world domination.

== Knight Sabers and allies ==
The Knight Sabers are a vigilante and mercenary team of four young women. To enhance their natural abilities, they each wear a Hard Suit – each of them specialized in its equipment and performance according to the respective wearer's field combat role. They were recruited by Sylia Stingray to battle the corrupt Genom corporation that dominates their home city of Megatokyo and which was responsible for her father's death. In order to finance their activities, the Knight Sabers also accept paying jobs as bodyguards or mercenaries. Their main activity is fighting out-of-control boomers, half biological/half-mechanical robots built by Genom.

=== Sylia Stingray ===
Sylia Stingray

Sylia Stingray (シリア・スティングレイ, Shiria Sutingurei) (spelled Silia in Bubblegum Crisis) is the 22-year-old ringleader of the Knight Sabers. She is a Hafu of British descent. Very calm and cool-headed, she does not show much emotion. She is the daughter of Dr. Katsuhito Stingray, the man who originally created the boomers. He was murdered by Genom executive Brian J. Mason, and his death was covered up as an accident, but an unknown individual managed to send Sylia a data unit, providing her with Genom's future plans and the technological means of creating the Knight Sabers' hardsuits. She wears a blue and silver Hard Suit equipped with retractable sword blades in the forearms, laser cannons in the palms and wings for full flight capability.

Professionally, Sylia is a wealthy businesswoman whose business ventures, aside from the mercenaries' fee, finance the team. Her primary business is the lingerie shop "Silky Doll" she personally runs, housed in her private building, Lady's 633, on whose top is also her penthouse apartment functioning as the Knight Sabers' base of operations. Her civilian vehicle is a red Mercedes-Benz 300SL Gullwing coupe; in Bubblegum Crisis Tokyo 2040, she drives a first-generation Porsche 911 Turbo. In the Bubblegum Crash sequel series, she refurnishes her business into a high-class fashion boutique.

Several questions about Sylia and her origins are raised in the series, but, due to the incompletion of the OVA series, never conclusively answered. In the spin-off comic Bubblegum Crisis: Grand Mal and the 2040 series, it is suggested that Sylia's brain was augmented by her father with Boomer-related technology, making her a human/Boomer hybrid.

In Tokyo 2040, Sylia takes a less active role, only suiting up occasionally for particularly tough enemies or personal vendettas due to her health. It is also revealed that the Knight Sabers are the second team she has led. The first team used more conventional hardsuits and were killed in combat. Unlike the original series, in Tokyo 2040 Sylia finances the team completely, and pays the other women double combat pay for tougher enemies. Also, unlike her stoic original self, Sylia is more flirtatious and playful on the surface, but prone to violent mood-swings when not in public.

Sylia is voiced by Yoshiko Sakakibara in Japanese and Jemila Ericson in English in the original series, and Satsuki Yukino and Laura Chapman in the 2040 series.

=== Priscilla S. Asagiri ===
Priscilla S. Asagiri

Priscilla "Priss" S. Asagiri (プリシラ・S・アサギリ, Purishira S. Asagiri; プリス Purisu) is the moody and defiant 19-year-old member of the Knight Sabers, fighting boomers with ferocious abandon in her slick dark blue Hard Suit, which features a railgun in the right hand as well as a laser gun in the original series and her signature knuckle bombers (explosive charges in both hands of her hard suit) in both series; in the Bubblegum Crash series the suit becomes a modular core system to which a variety of selective heavy weapons can be attached. In the Crisis series, her Hard Suit also combines with her Motoslave (a motorcycle that transforms into an automated mecha or an exosuit) to combat more-advanced Boomers.

In Crisis, Crash, and Tokyo 2040, Priss is a Japanese-American rock singer and biker; her band's name, "Priss and the Replicants", is a direct reference to Blade Runner. She is the rival and love interest of A.D. Police officer Leon McNichol. Priss is an orphan of the 2025 Kantō earthquake, who joined a biker gang. After her boyfriend was killed and his death declared insignificant by the police (giving her a dislike for the law enforcement), she attempted to hunt down the killers, but she was recruited into the Sabers instead. She also befriended Sylvie, a biker girl who was actually a runaway 33-S sexaroid, and who she was forced to kill. Priss' rebellious streak is tempered by a good heart and sense of humor, which may explain her ability to function in Sylia Stingray's demanding and disciplined operation. She essentially serves as the hammer of the outfit—as opposed to Sylia's leadership and genius, Nene's tech wizardry, and Linna's sleek athletic precision.

Priss was voiced by rock singer Kinuko Ohmori in Bubblegum Crisis, but after the series was cancelled, she decided to focus full-time on her recording career, and thus J-pop singer Ryoko Tachikawa took over the role in Bubblegum Crash. In English, she is voiced by Sinda Nichols normally while the English singing voice is done by Joyce Leigh Bowden in the original series, with Yuu Asakawa and Christine Auten in the 2040 series.

=== Linna Yamazaki ===
Linna Yamazaki

Linna Yamazaki (リンナ山崎, Rinna Yamazaki) is a 20-year-old member of the Knight Sabers. She is the only member of the Sabers that isn't a Hafu. Linna dons a green Hard Suit equipped with "ribbon cutters" – long, electrically charged nanomolecular ropes mounted behind the helmet that can be used to slash through Boomers and other high-tech opponents. She is also armed with explosive "knuckle bombers" – explosive charges in the right hand of her hard suit that could deliver devastating blows, as well as a finger-mounted triplet laser gun. In Bubblegum Crash, the knuckle bombers and lasers are replaced with electrically charged twin wire-daggers.

Working as an aerobics instructor, Linna once hoped to pursue a career in professional dancing, but her efforts in the trials went unappreciated by all but Sylia, who recruited her into her team. Eventually, her constant greed for money makes her switch to stockbroker consulting in Bubblegum Crash.

Linna is perhaps the most socially conventional of the Sabers. As such, she lacks a distinct personality. But she is an excellent team player, and the stories linking Episode 2 with Episode 7 (Irene's death and Vision's peace) would be inconceivable without Linna's heartfelt warmth and decency. There is a comic side to her, especially in tandem with the foibles of Nene.

Linna is voiced by Michie Tomizawa in Japanese and Elizabeth Becka in English in the original series, with Rio Natsuki and Kelly Manison in the 2040 series.

Linna's character is significantly more fleshed-out in the 2040 series. She is the 20-year-old daughter of an old fashioned country couple, but took work in Tokyo to get away from her demanding father. At her desk job as a clerk in Tokyo she has to deal with managers who try to abuse their positions to the point of sexual harassment. She also must directly work under female boomer robots used as middle managers that do not allow mistakes or free time while at work.

She is not a member of the Knight Sabers at the beginning of Tokyo 2040, and actively tracks down Priss demanding to join them. Later episodes continue to show that she is highly driven to surpass Priss as the best Knight Saber of the group and help as many people as possible. She even openly admits to Priss that her goal is to be better than her.

=== Nene Romanova ===
Nene Romanova

Nene Romanova (ネネ・ロマノーヴァ, Nene Romanōva) is an 18-year-old member of the Knight Sabers, acting as a technical conductor and hacker, and is an employee of the AD Police, functioning as the Knight Saber's mole in the ADP world. She is a Hāfu of Russian descent. She is bubbly, naive, has an affinity for candy and junk food, and is blissfully inept with real world logic. Due to her lack of (and unwillingness to engage in) regular exercise, she is often teased by Priss and Linna for not being more physically durable.

Nene's blue and pink Hard Suit's offensive weapon is a weak laser gun unsuited for taking out enemies; instead, it is used to scribble the Knight Sabers' signature onto their scene of actions. She relies on her suit's computer and electronic warfare systems to stay away from an enemy. In episode 8 of Crisis, Nene receives an upgraded red and pink colored suit. She gets another new suit in Crash. Her suit's offensive capabilities are stocked up considerably with an electromagnetic pulse striker and the capability of physically hacking into a Boomer's computer brain.

Nene is voiced by Akiko Hiramatsu in Japanese and Susan Grillo in English, with Hiroko Konishi and Hilary Haag in the 2040 series.

=== Mackie Stingray ===
Mackie Stingray (マッキー・スティングレイ, Makki Sutingurei) is Sylia's younger brother and her only family. He serves as the Knight Sabers' backup and mechanic along with Sylia's friend, Dr. Raven. Mackie is a whiz kid with computers and technology. He has to constantly make repairs to Priss's bike because of her driving and the situations she gets into. He can pilot an armored suit himself and drives a large truck that delivers the Knight Sabers and their bikes to a situation. Mackie's character is also extremely perverted, trying to catch his sister (as well as the other Knight Sabers) in the nude as much as he can.

Mackie is voiced by Nozomu Sasaki in Japanese and Frank Trimble in English in the original series.

In the 2040 storyline Mackie is much more polite. His sister Sylia tries to keep Mackie from becoming involved, but he helps the former Genom employee named Nigel at his rundown motorcycle shop and builds and repairs the team's Hardsuits. It is later revealed that Mackie is actually a prototype Boomer that has a more advanced brain modeled after Sylia's own brain functions. In both versions, Mackie also shows romantic feelings towards Nene Romanova.

=== Fargo ===
Fargo (ファーゴ, Fāgo) is an informant. His background is unknown, but his information includes data from the government, Genom, and the various criminal syndicates and underworlds, so he has a lot of connections. He has found the Knight Sabers a few Genom-related contracts, and Sylia trusts him to the point that he knows her true identity. He even has the audacity to ask Sylia into dangerous parts of Megatokyo after dark for meetings, and is constantly pursuing her as a sexual conquest. Sylia, however, does not have any interest in this and makes it very obvious.

Fargo is voiced by Kōichi Yamadera and by Geoffery Honaker in English.

=== Nigel Kirkland ===
Nigel Kirkland is a major supporting character in Bubblegum Crisis Tokyo 2040. He is a former Genom employee from America who worked as an assistant to Sylia's father in his work on prototype Boomers. He owns his own motorcycle repair shop, but still uses his skills to help Sylia by being the main mechanic of the Knight Sabers, as he routinely performs maintenance on the hardsuits and eventually builds new ones. He is also a target of romantic feelings from both Priss and Sylia. He also befriends Mackie and has him be his assistant, and even lets him move in with him due to the strained relationship he has with Sylia.

=== Meisio ===
Meisio is a supporting character from Bubblegum Crisis Tokyo 2040. He is the faithful elderly butler of the Stingray family and Sylia's former guardian who constantly worries about Sylia's health (both physically and mentally) during the Knight Sabers' operations, thus playing the role of a sort-of voice of reason for Sylia.

== GENOM Corporation ==
In the Bubblegum Crisis universe, the GENOM Corporation is the primary manufacturer and distributor of the bio-organic constructs known as "Boomers". This makes GENOM the primary enemy of the Knight Sabers – led by Sylia Stingray, daughter of the man who created the Boomers. In both versions of the series, GENOM is run by a mysterious figure named Quincy, though the depiction of Quincy varies from one continuity to another (in the original series he was a dangerous, hands-on owner, while in Tokyo 2040 he is almost a puppet vegetable of a man, so old and decrepit he needs tubes and wires to keep himself alive while insanely dreaming of a boomer/human paradise). Brian J. Mason also works for GENOM, and his schemes are either offshoots of or interference to Quincy's.

To show the power and domination of GENOM, the viewer is shown the gargantuan GENOM Towers, which stand in many of that world's most important cities. These towers bear a resemblance to the Tower of Babel, both in appearance and in symbolism, as well as the Tyrell Corporation's tower in Blade Runner.

=== Brian J. Mason / Largo ===
Brian J. Mason is the primary villain of the first three episodes, a high-level executive in the GENOM corporation who killed Dr. Stingray and stole his Boomer technology. As with Sylia, certain mysteries are created around Mason which are never resolved in the series. It is generally accepted that Mason somehow transferred his personality into a boomer body some time prior to his death in episode 3, resurfacing in episodes 5 and 6 under the identity of Largo. Most likely, he succeeded in transferring his memories into the ultimate Boomer, thus creating a God-like being able to vaporize three major GENOM branch towers in a single instant at will using a mental link with the USSD's particle-beam satellites. Despite being killed by the combined efforts of the Knight Sabers in episode 6 of Crisis, Largo resurfaces to become the primary villain in the Crash sequel.

In Bubblegum Crisis Tokyo 2040, Mason again appears as one of the main antagonists of the series. It is revealed that Mason is part-human and part-Boomer in the series. He works behind Quincy's back on a secret Boomer project and activates the "Dragon Line", an energy stream that turns every Boomer in Megatokyo rogue, causing them to merge with buildings, vehicles and other electronic equipment present in the city. He also captures Galatea before she could be destroyed by the Knight Sabers, and experiments on her during the second half of the series. Near the end of the series, he is betrayed by Galatea and killed, as Galatea has ambitions to wipe out the human race.

Mason was voiced by Shuuichi Ikeda in Japanese and by Eric Paisley in English, while his Largo persona was voiced by Kazuyuki Sogabe and Pierre Brulatour in the Japanese and English versions respectively. In a scene from Blade Runner, the word Largo appears singularly on a prominently displayed piece of sheet music.

=== Quincy Rosenkroitz ===
The Chief Executive and founder of GENOM, Quincy is an enigmatic old man who hides many secrets under the face of an unfazeable and ruthless businessman. His company participates in the manufacture of many necessities around the world, but in fact Quincy wants to seize total economic and political domination of the world.

While he makes several appearances in the series, he is never truly met personally. He is killed twice, only to be revealed each time as an android double. It is speculated by fans that he may have downloaded his personality into GENOM's main database; several clues to this are offered in the AD Police manga series.

Quincy is voiced by Kiyoshi Kawakubo in Japanese and David Arnold in English.

In Bubblegum Crisis Tokyo 2040, Quincy bears the family name Rosenkroitz, and being confined to a life support system, is far less active than his OVA version. He is not shown as a thoroughly evil person, more like a whimsical, childlike mind thinking of Boomers as friends to mankind. Near the end of the series, he is killed by Brian J. Mason.

=== Boomers ===
Boomers are synthetic life forms produced by the GENOM Corporation. They are developed specifically for specific jobs, such as acting as maids, waiters, bodyguards, store mannequins, and military weapons. Some (very advanced and expensive models) have gained sentience and developed minds of their own, but most are simply machines. Boomers designed for infiltration and combat are capable of appearing human, whether male or female, but tend to "burst" out of their synthetic skin in combat situations, revealing their true selves: large, metallic killing machines armed with built-in weapons such as lasers, machine guns, and arm blades capable of cleaving through a fire hydrant. These "Military Combat Boomers", or simply Combat Boomers, are sometimes also referred to as "light mobile armored combat machines" (the latter possibly a common generic designation for autonomous military robots of a certain size). Such boomers are generally classified as C-Class Boomers.

==== Sylvie ====
Sylvie is a female character who appears on episode 5 "Moonlight Rambler". She and her friends Meg, Lou, Nam and Anri try to escape from space station Genaros in a stolen shuttle, but only Sylvie and Anri make it; and eventually they crash-land near Megatokyo. Upon reaching the metropolis, Sylvie befriends Priss without revealing her origin. It is revealed that she is a Sexaroid (a Boomer designed to be a love-doll) model 33-S designed to feed on human blood as if she is a vampire and pilot "D.D.", a heavily armed mecha with a fail-safe mechanism that can be set to self-destruct with a nuclear reactor if the power runs out. Priss is left no choice but to kill Sylvie to deactivate the D.D.'s self-destruct mechanism.

Sylvie is voiced by Yoshino Takamori in Japanese and Martha Ellen Senseney in English.

==== Anri ====
Anri is a Sexaroid who fled with Sylvie from the space station Genaros to Earth. During their escape, Anri was badly wounded, which forced Sylvie to kill people around Megatokyo for their blood to keep Anri alive. In episode 6 "Red Eyes", she is hired by Largo as his assistant. During a confrontation between Largo and Priss, Anri stabs Priss when Largo tells her the truth about Sylvie's death; to which Priss explains her reason and asks Anri for forgiveness. Anri is then killed when she blocks an energy blast fired by Largo toward Priss, but Anri forgives her before she dies, while Largo mocks her sacrifice.

Anri is voiced by Yuko Mizutani in Japanese and by Katherine Burton in English.

==== Galatea ====
Galatea is the main antagonist of Bubblegum Crisis Tokyo 2040. She is a secret Boomer Project started by Sylia's father, Dr. Katsuhito Stingray. It is revealed in a flashback scene that she was grown from an implant inserted into Sylia's brain against her mother's wishes. Before the events of the series, Dr. Stingray asked her to go into stasis when she started to function strangely, but she killed him despite complying. Because of her uncontrollable nature, Quincy Rosenkroitz of Genom used a bomb to cause the Great Kanto Earthquake in order to seal her underground and prevent her from contaminating boomers for her own design. When she is initially seen, she has an appearance like that of a prepubescent Sylia. She is released from stasis by Brian J. Mason halfway through the series and rapidly matures from her childlike appearance to an adult almost identical to Sylia. After her plans are revealed her hair turns black and her eyes change to red. Late in the series, her mind begins maturing and she begins questioning the meaning and purpose of her existence. Near the end of the series, Galatea has Mason killed, and with her enormous power, becomes one with Genom Tower and brings it into outer space with the intent of annihilating the human race. Due to her health, Sylia stays behind and sends Priss, Linna, and Nene to a Genom space station to destroy her. Linna and Nene are unable to defeat Galatea as they run out of energy and are forced to retreat back to Earth. In the final episode, Priss defeats Galatea, but helps her find her path, and Galatea, in return, saves Priss' life and helps her return to Earth.

Galatea is voiced by Yui Horie in Japanese and Laura Chapman and Kira Vincent-Davis in English.

== AD Police ==
=== Leon McNichol ===
An A.D. Police officer from America, Leon McNichol is a dedicated cop with a tendency to rush in without thinking. He is a skilled powered armor pilot, one of the A.D. Police's aces in its K-11 and K-12S powered suits.

Leon has a crush on Priss, which she does not like since she has a grudge against the A.D. Police. As the series progresses, he discovers that she is a Knight Saber but continues to help the team as best as he can. Priss and Leon's relationship grows closer during the series, and in a side story audio drama, written by series author Toshimichi Suzuki, she confesses that she loves him, though this is not referenced in the sequel Bubblegum Crash.

In the 2040 series, Leon is burlier and gruffer than his Artmic version, and initially more antagonistic towards the Knight Sabers because in his eyes they are soiling the honor of the A.D. Police by eliminating maddened Boomers before they can. However, in time he begins to change his mind, especially since he and Priss begin to take a liking to each other, and they both return each other's feelings.

Leon also appears in the AD Police manga and anime series, where he is yet a rookie officer.

Leon is voiced by Toshio Furukawa in Japanese and Brad Moranz in English.

=== Daley Wong ===
Daley Wong is Leon's partner, and a highly skilled investigator. He is Chinese-American and also openly homosexual, which is worth noting because at the time the original OVA was produced male homosexual characters were quite rare in anime. Also notable is the ease and comfort of Daley and Leon's working relationship: Daley flirts openly with the heterosexual Leon whenever Leon's temper tends to get the better of him, and Leon often reciprocates with good humor.

Daley is not developed much in the series. He is, however, portrayed to be loyal and highly competent, both as Leon's underling and as a commander in his own right (in the first and final episodes he is shown commanding his own AD Police squad). Daley's sense of humor is very dry and understated; his 2040 version is more openly sarcastic, especially towards Leon.

Daley is voiced by Kenyuu Horiuchi in Japanese and Marshall Carroll in English.

=== Naoko ===
Nene's colleague (as an ADP Operator) and best friend outside the Knight Sabers; the two share a common interest in popular music and looking for a boyfriend. She is voiced by Junko Asami in Japanese and by Belinda Bizic in English.

=== Chief Todo ===
The African American Chief of the AD Police (his name could be a mispronunciation of Todd) is a bad-tempered man who has to put up both with official restrictions and rebellious underlings, Leon in particular. He was originally from Chicago, Illinois but immigrated to Japan after the Second Great Kanto earthquake all but decimated Tokyo's infrastructure. Despite his grouchy personality, Todo cares for his men; he has gone so far as granting Leon the freedom he needs without his 'official' knowledge or approval on several occasions. He has a niece, Lisa, who plays a central role in episode eight "Scoop Chase".

Todo is voiced by Masaharu Satō in Japanese and David Kraus in English.

=== Gina Malso ===
Inspector Gina Malso is the former partner of Leon McNichol featured in the A.D. Police Files series. Originally a Normal Police officer, she transferred to the A.D. Police for its more action-oriented nature. A slightly rough and tumble woman, Gina possesses a deep hatred of the Boomers she and the rest of A.D. Police battle. After losing her arm to a Boomer she fought, she had the Boomer's arm grafted to her as a replacement. She loses that arm in the AD Police comics while fighting a terrorist group led by an old boyfriend of hers and a boomer fused with it.

== Other characters ==
=== Irene Chang ===
Appearing in Episode 2: "Born to Kill", Irene Chang is a young woman who goes to the same fitness club where Linna teaches an aerobics class. She's the younger sister of Reika Chang. She was engaged to an employee of the GENOM Corporation, but her fiancé went missing, which led her in a quest to expose GENOM's secrets. Unfortunately, she is murdered by a female Boomer, which results in a retaliation by the Knight Sabers on the corporation. Although Linna avenges Irene's murder by killing the Boomer responsible, her death sets the chain of events in Episode 7 in motion.

Irene is voiced by Miki Itō in Japanese and by Jean Hrdlicka.

=== J.B. Gibson ===
In Episode 4: "Revenge Road", J.B. Gibson drives a heavily modified Griffon supercar. A few months earlier, Gibson and his girlfriend Naomi were assaulted on the road by a biker gang, which resulted in Naomi's mind locked in a catatonic state. In retaliation, Gibson modified his Griffon with only one goal: to destroy the biker gang responsible. However, his crusade backfires when the car develops a mind of its own after having been equipped with a device that interfaces with his brainwaves. During a high-speed chase, the Knight Sabers successfully extract Gibson and Naomi out of the speeding Griffon before A.D. Police dispose of the vehicle. They are both mentioned by Sylia to have been arrested by the police and their fates are not shown afterwards.

Gibson is voiced by Kaneto Shiozawa in Japanese and Zach Hanner in English.

=== Reika Chang / Vision ===
In Episode 7: "Double Vision", Reika Chang is a Chinese-American singer who performs under the name Vision. She travels to Megatokyo to start her world tour, but her music career is merely a facade. She is the elder sister of Irene Chang, who was murdered by the GENOM Corporation in Episode 2. Moreover, she is an heiress to the "Hou Bang", a powerful Chinese triad organization bent on destroying GENOM and the American firm Gulf & Bradley – both of whom are collaborating on a Super Boomer project. Linna eventually manages to help Reika abandon her path of revenge and convinces her to continue her singing career.

Reika was intended to replace Priss in the series when a dispute with Kinuko Oomori's recording contract arose and Priss was originally to be killed, but an outcry from fans convinced the producers otherwise and reversed this decision. This is alluded to further in Episode 8, when Reika makes a cameo appearance at the drive-in theater where Sylia is meeting with Fargo. She appears in the movie playing behind them on-screen, wearing a dark blue hardsuit similar to the Knight Sabers, but without a helmet.

Reika is voiced by Maiko Hashimoto in the Japanese version. She is also her character's singing voice. In the English version, she is voiced by Mindi Lyons for her normal voice while the singing voice is provided by Cyndi Wheeler.

=== Lisa Vanette ===
Appearing in episode 8 "Scoop Chase", Lisa Vanette is the niece of AD Police Chief Todo and an aspiring photojournalist who sets her sights on exposing the Knight Sabers when she photographs a fight between them and a renegade Boomer and Priss smashes her camera to prevent her from capturing their activities on film. Like her uncle, Lisa is African American. Nene is assigned to accompany Lisa around the city. One night, after a fight between the Knight Sabers and a Boomer, Lisa discovers in one of her photos that Nene is one of them after her helmet is damaged in battle. But after coming to appreciate the work the Knight Sabers do, she eventually turns the photo and its digital negative over to Nene.

Lisa is voiced by Aya Hisakawa in Japanese and Amy Parrish in English.
