= Kiyonobu Suzuki (voice actor) =

Japanese voice actor (born 1950)

Kiyonobu Suzuki 鈴木 清信
- Born: November 20, 1950 (age 75); Niigata, Niigata, Japan
- Occupation: Voice actor
- Years active: 1970-present
- Notable credit(s): Mobile Suit Gundam as Hayato Kobayashi

Kiyonobu Suzuki (鈴木 清信; born November 20, 1950 in Niigata, Niigata) is a Japanese voice actor. His most famous role is perhaps Hayato Kobayashi in Mobile Suit Gundam, Mobile Suit Zeta Gundam, Mobile Suit Gundam ZZ, and the MSG Movie Trilogy.

== Filmography ==
=== Television animation ===
1970s

- Robokko Beeton (1976) – Gakiranger
- Hit and Run (1979) – Take
- Mobile Suit Gundam (1979) – Hayato Kobayashi; Job John; Lang (ep22); March (ep23); Marker Clan (ep2); Oscar Dublin

1980s

- Space Warrior Baldios (1980) – Jack Oliver
- Ashita no Joe 2 (1980) – Tarō
- Belle and Sebastian (1981) – Partner
- Dogtanian and the Three Muskehounds (1981)
- Fang of the Sun Dougram (1981) – Fester
- Kaibutsu-kun (1981) – Banno
- The Kabocha Wine (1982) – Kotaro Hayakawa
- Armored Trooper Votoms (1983) – Rador
- Bemubemu Hunter Kotengumaru (1983) – Shisumashi
- Mobile Suit Zeta Gundam (1985) – Hayato Kobayashi
- Mobile Suit Gundam ZZ (1986) – Hayato Kobayashi
- Uchuusen Sagittarius (1986)

1990s

- Cooking Papa (1992) – Megane
- Pokémon (1997) – Gangar
- Master Keaton (1998) – Shreider (ep 14)
- Outlaw Star (1998) – Hitoriga
- Angel Links (1999) – Gordon

2000s

- Sugar: A Little Snow Fairy (2001) – Luchino
- Ground Defense Force! Mao-chan (2002) – Sorajirou Tsukishima
- Mirmo! (2002) – Tain (Fairy School)
- Paranoia Agent (2004) – Shinsuke Hatomura (eps 1,10-12)
- Beet the Vandel Buster Excellion (2005) – Padro
- Canvas 2: Niji Iro no Sketch (2005) – Principal (eps 15,16)
- Glass Mask (2005) – Board chairman (ep 42-44,46,48)
- Kamichu! (2005) – Gen-san (DVD ep 9)
- Black Lagoon: The Second Barrage (2006) – Lobos (eps 16-18)
- Gintama (2006) – Murata Jintetsu (Ep. 61); Nezumiya; Space Dad (Ep. 93)
- Spider Riders (2006) – Chairman (ep 20)
- Oh! Edo Rocket (2007) – Santa
- Allison & Lillia (2008) – Terreur (ep 9-10)
- Ayakashi: Samurai Horror Tales (2008) – Yahei (Bakeneko)
- GeGeGe no Kitarō (5th Series) (2008) – Osore

2010s

- Croisée in a Foreign Labyrinth (2011) – Yannick
- Crayon Shin-chan (2013) – Shogun Fumin

2020s

- Drifting Dragons (2020) – Ura

=== OVA ===
- Dragon Century (1988) – Gelda
- Vampire Princess Miyu (1988) – Miyu's Father
- A.D. Police Files (1990) – Hyde Kashew
- Hakkenden: Legend of the Dog Warriors (1990) – Yoshirou Ubayaki
- Sengoku Busho Retsuden Bakufu Doji Hissatsuman (1990) – Tokugawa Ieyasu
- Bubblegum Crash (1991) – D.J. Tommy (Ep 3); Manager (Ep 1)
- Moldiver (1993)
- Legend of the Galactic Heroes (1996) – Elsheimer
- Steel Angel Kurumi Encore (2000) – Narrator (Ep. 26); President (Ep. 25)
- New Fist of the North Star (2003) – Ches

=== Theatrical animation ===
- Mobile Suit Gundam (1981) – Hayato Kobayashi
- Mobile Suit Gundam: Soldiers of Sorrow (1981) – Hayato Kobayashi
- Mobile Suit Gundam: Encounters in Space (1982) – Hayato Kobayashi
- Slayers The Motion Picture (1995) – Sorcerer A
- Gintama: The Movie (2010) – Murata Jintetsu
- Detective Conan: Private Eye in the Distant Sea (2013) – Hayato Watanabe

=== Tokusatsu ===
- Juukou B-Fighter (1995) - Synthetic Beast Namakeruge (ep. 12)
- Ninpu Sentai Hurricaneger (2002) - Mirage Ninja Jin-Giron (ep. 21-22)

=== Dubbing ===
==== Live-action ====
- Cast Away – Yuri (Peter von Berg)
- The Hundred-Foot Journey – Mayor (Michel Blanc)
- Loving Vincent – Père Tanguy (John Sessions)
- Moonrise Kingdom – Narrator
- The Monuments Men – Viktor Stahl (Justus von Dohnányi)
- Paris 36 – Pigoil (Gérard Jugnot)

==== Animation ====
- The Batman – Francis Grey
- Police Academy – Zed McGlunk
- Thomas and Friends - Duck (Season 12 onwards(succeeding Kōzō Shioya) and Sir Robert Norramby (Season 17 onwards(replacing Shingo Fufimori)
