= Bubblegum Crash! =

1991 video game

- Publisher: Naxat
- Series: Bubblegum Crisis
- Platform: PC Engine
- Release: JP: December 6, 1991
- Genre: Adventure

Bubblegum Crash! (Note: Japanese: バブルガムクラッシュ, Hepburn: Baburugamukurasshu) is a 1991 adventure game for the PC Engine. The game was based upon the anime original video animation series Bubblegum Crash (1991). The game has a science fiction narrative and is set in a futuristic city. The protagonists are an all female team called the Knight Sabers. In the game, players progress by selecting icons.

The game was released in Japan on December 6, 1991. Some reviewers complimented it as a solid adventure game or highlighted the graphics, others found it too difficult to progress or found the interface too small to use properly.

== Background and plot ==
Between 1989 and 1992, very few Japanese adventure games were distributed beyond a few mystery-themed releases or games featuring manga and anime characters. Bubblegum Crash! was one of these games, being based on Bubblegum Crash (1991), a three-episode original video animation (OVA) sequel to Bubblegum Crisis (1987-1991). These videos were sold on home video or rented in rental shops and often gave film-length stories over various episodes without having the budget of a feature length film. The video game is based of the series.

In Bubblegum Crash!, the game has a science fiction narrative and is set in a futuristic city. The protagonists are an all female team called the Knight Sabers.

== Gameplay ==
Bubblegum Crash! is an adventure game. Players progress through the game by selecting icons.

== Release and reception ==
Reception

Review scores
Publication	Score
Famitsu	6/10, 6/10, 7/10, 6/10
Gekkan PC Engine	75/100, 80/100, 70/100, 60/100, 65/100
Marukatsu PC Engine	5/10, 5/10, 7/10, 6/10

Bubblegum Crash! was released in Japan on December 6, 1991 for the PC Engine. Reviewers in the Japanese magazines Famicom Tsūshin, Gekkan PC Engine and Marukatsu PC Engine commented on the game in terms of graphics, difficulty, and ease-of-use.

Some reviewers in Famicom Tsūshin described it as a difficult adventure game where they got stuck on how to progress early on. Reviewers in Gekkan PC Engine and Marukatsu PC Engine echoed this saying while a more linear adventure game would have been dull, having so much area to traverse with no direction made it too difficult.

Reviewers in Famicom Tsūshin and Gekkan PC Engine found the graphics to be high quality, with one reviewer in the latter publications described the battle scenes as a highlight. A number of reviewers in Gekkan PC Engine and Marukatsu PC Engine wished it had been made for the PC Engine CD-ROM. A reviewer for the latter magazine commented that it appears to have been difficult to create a game like this for the HuCard format, when there are so many games that make use of visuals like this on compact disc.

One reviewer in Famicom Tsūshin said they were unfamiliar with the original anime series, which made it difficult to get involved with the game. Another from the publication said they enjoyed these types of stories and found it easy to get involved. A reviewer in Gekkan PC Engine found it disappointing that the dialogue and graphics don't seem to match the mood of each, while one reviewer in Marukatsu PC Engine said the plot and the themes of the story felt a bit forced.

Reviewers commented on the graphical-menu format, with one reviewer in Famicom Tsūshin saying it resembled the menu-system of the earlier Family Computer game Sanma no Meitantei (1987). Some reivewers in Gekkan PC Engine and Marukatsu PC Engine found it the menus two small for the screen which did not make them easier to use.

While on reviewer in Famicom Tsūshin said that the game felt a bit old-fashioned, two reviewers in Gekkan PC Engine still felt it was a solid adventure game.

== See also ==
- List of TurboGrafx-16 games
- List of video games based on anime or manga
