= Half Is More =

Japanese manga series

- First tankōbon volume cover

半分姉弟 (Hanbun Kyōdai)
- Genre: Drama
- Manga
- Written by: Yoico Fujimi
- Published by: Leed Publishing
- English publisher: NA: Viz Media
- Imprint: Torch Comics
- Magazine: Torch Web
- Original run: June 29, 2022 – present
- Volumes: 1
- icon

Half Is More (Japanese: 半分姉弟, Hepburn: Hanbun Kyōdai) is a Japanese manga series written and illustrated by Yoiko Fujimi. It began serialization on Leed Publishing's Torch Web manga website in June 2022.

== Synopsis ==
The series focuses on the lives of two hāfu siblings who are the children of a Black French father and a Japanese mother.

== Publication ==
Written and illustrated by Yoico Fujimi, Half Is More began serialization on Leed Publishing's Torch Web manga website on June 29, 2022. Its chapters have been compiled into a single tankōbon volume as of March 2025.

In October 2025, Viz Media announced that they had licensed the series for English publication, with the first volume being released in August 2026.

No.	Original release date	Original ISBN	North American release date	North American ISBN
1	March 28, 2025	978-4-845-86787-5	August 18, 2026	978-1-9747-1694-4
1. "Kazumi Mandanda Yoneyama"; 2. "Saeko Sekiguchi"; 3. "Marina Kamebuchi"; 4. "Rushia Numata"; 5. "Alexandra de la Rosa"; Special Bonus: "Kazumi's Youth"

== Reception ==
The manga won the 4th Crea Late Night Manga Award in 2025 hosted by Bungeishunjū's Crea magazine. It topped the 2026 edition of Takarajimasha's Kono Manga ga Sugoi! guidebook's list of the best manga for female readers. The series was ranked eleventh in Freestyle Magazine's "The Best Manga 2026" ranking in 2025. The series was nominated for the 30th Tezuka Osamu Cultural Prize in 2026.
