= Halving the Bones =

1996 documentary by Ruth Ozeki

Halving the Bones is a documentary written, produced, and directed by author Ruth Ozeki. The film is shot in color/black-and-white and runs 70 minutes in length. The film premiered in 1995 in film festivals such as the Sundance Film Festival, San Francisco Asian American Film Festival, and the Margaret Mead Film Festival. Ozeki's film has been awarded the International Documentary Association Distinguished Achievement Award, the Kodak Award for Creative Cinematography, and the San Francisco International Film Festival Certificate of Merit.

== Synopsis ==
Narrator Ruth Ozeki explains that she had attended her Japanese maternal grandmother's funeral in Tokyo five years prior to the events depicted in the documentary. In Japan, when someone is cremated, their bones are not reduced to ash. Instead, half are preserved and split between the descendants. The rest of the bones are buried in a cemetery. Ruth is given a fragment of skull, a small part of a rib, and an unidentified bone to bring back to the United States for her mother who did not attend the funeral. Reluctant to give the bones to her mother, Ruth lets the bones sit in a tea can on her shelf in her closet. Years pass by, and finally Ruth decides it is time to complete the task given to her so many years ago.

This film is separated into three sections. In the first section, Ruth tells the story of her grandmother's immigration to America as a picture bride who marries a Japanese photographer and poet. Ozeki tells the audience that her grandmother fell in love with her grandfather at first sight and was very content living in Hawaii. Ruth's grandfather was an eccentric man who wrote one poem a day, made short films, and practiced rigorous mental training. He could impale his arm with a blade without bleeding and could walk on the blades of swords with his bare feet without injury. Also in the first section of the film, Ruth shows a series of short home films depicting her grandmother, supposedly filmed by her grandfather. Yet, as Ozeki transitions into the second section of the film, she debunks many of the events mentioned in the first section.

Ruth states that her grandmother hated Hawaii and the small rural town that she lived in. She missed Japan and the familiarity of Tokyo. Thus, when she became pregnant with her second child, Ruth's grandmother falsely claimed sickness and was diagnosed to have a tumor in her stomach, which was actually her unborn daughter. Her grandmother then traveled by ship back to Japan to be treated by a specialist. Ruth explains that this is why her mother was born in Japan. Additionally, Ruth admits that she had created the home videos shown in the first section of the film. She explains that she had fabricated the clips in order to portray how she wanted to represent her family's history.

In the third and final section of the film, Ruth delivers her grandmother's bones to her mother along with many of her grandmother's old belongings. Now in the narrative present, Ruth's mother rifles through old keepsakes and speaks briefly about each memento before finding the tea can holding the preserved bones. Ruth's mother compliments the tea can and carefully picks up each of the bones, thanking Ruth for bringing them back to her. Ruth asks her mother if she would wish to come along to set the bones to rest in Hawaii. Her mother refuses, stating she did not wish to revisit the old friends and memories from her childhood in Hawaii. She does, however, ask Ruth to take her bones along with Ruth's grandmother's bones and throw them both into the sea in Hawaii once she dies. Ruth agrees to one day fulfill her mother's wishes. Ruth then travels to Hawaii without her mother. After visiting her mother's old friends, Ruth visits the USS Arizona Memorial in Pearl Harbor. On the memorial, Ruth notices that one man whose last name was Lounsbury – Ruth's father's last name – had been killed in the events of Pearl Harbor. She realizes that in her exploration of her maternal-side family history, she had neglected her paternal-side family history. The film ends as Ruth throws her mother's and grandmother's bones into the Pacific Ocean. The gesture is likely symbolic, as Ruth's mother is revealed to still be alive during the credits.

== Analysis ==
Ruth Ozeki as the narrator and one of the main characters of the film, is known to be subject to her own opinions and biases. In the first third of the film, Ozeki leads the audience to believe in a falsified family history. In the second third of the film, she admits to having created the film clips and poems that had been attributed to her grandfather. In narration, she states that she more-or-less imagined a family history in order to reconcile her feelings of disconnectedness with her family. In an initial scene, a dramatized voice-over of her Ruth's grandmother explains that “Ruth” is difficult to pronounce in Japanese, in which the name roughly translates to “absent.” Absence in Halving the Bones is a theme which is often depicted through the disconnected relationships between generations. For example, the absence of Ruth's grandmother from her memory is the catalyst for Ruth's quest for truth. Ruth's grandmother is sent to Hilo, Hawaii against her wishes to marry a man she had never met, but she contends that it was a happy period of her life. Half a century later, Ruth is suspicious of her grandmother's account of her youth. Once Ruth's grandmother had died, Ruth felt it was necessary to create a realistic representation of her grandmother's journey because otherwise, her memories would be forgotten. For Ruth, absence is an obstacle which must be overcome for the sake of preservation of memory.

We find that Ozeki often plays with the truth which sets a light hearted tone throughout the film. The viewer is led on to follow along with what seems to be whimsical musings of the narrator and her representations of reality. Ozeki is set on discovering the truth from the start of the film. For example, in the first few minutes of the film, Ozeki refutes the common hegemonic values of Asian women by saying that her mother was nothing like the hegemonic norm. By doing this, Ozeki redefines our truth and sets standards of her own.

Also, concerning infinity and totality, many of the characters seen in the film would be considered to have infinite depth especially Ruth herself. The purpose in Ozeki making this film is connect herself to her maternal family's history and to reconnect to her alienated mother who has only had limited contact with her relatives for a long while. Yet, as said by Ozeki at the end of the film, as she connects to one side of the family, she feels even more distant from the other side. When Ruth visits the USS Arizona memorial she mentions that she can only guess at the history of her father's ancestry which connotes the thought that her knowledge of her paternal family is extremely limited. So, as one story closes another begins.
