= A Tale for the Time Being =

2013 novel by Ruth Ozeki

- Author: Ruth Ozeki
- Language: English
- Publisher: Viking
- Publication date: March 12, 2013
- Publication place: USA
- Pages: 432pp
- ISBN: 978-0-670-02663-0
- OCLC: 841015817
- Dewey Decimal: 813.54
- LC Class: 2012-39878

A Tale for the Time Being is a metafictional novel by Ruth Ozeki narrated by two characters, a sixteen-year-old Japanese American girl living in Tokyo who keeps a diary, and a Japanese American writer living on an island off the coast of British Columbia who finds the diary of the young woman washed ashore some time after the 2011 tsunami that devastated Japan.

== Overview ==
Nao, a second-generation Japanese American and native California girl, experiences the pain and discomfort of being uprooted from her home in Silicon Valley after her father loses his job, prompting her family to move back to Tokyo. Nao identifies as an American and feels like "an ordinary California girl adopted by Japanese parents", though she feels alienated in her new environment and finds it difficult to relate to the Japanese part of her identity. Part of this discomfort derives from the fact that – unlike her parents, who identify as Japanese and speak the language fluently – she only speaks conversational Japanese and has a very limited knowledge of and exposure to Japanese culture.

Identifying more as an American, Nao feels completely disconnected from her surroundings, and feels as if her "life is unreal, and Sunnyvale, which was real, was a jillion miles away in time and space, like the beautiful Earth from outer space." She struggles to assimilate in the new environment and experiences the disorientation of being viewed as "the other" in the country of her ethnic heritage. Her foreignness in Japan, as an American, leads to relentless bullying from her classmates.

Not only does she have to grapple with her own social struggles, Nao is also plagued by an unhappy family life. Her father, unable to find a job in Japan, falls into a state of depression – withdrawing from the world and going into a state of social seclusion, or hikikomori – and attempts suicide twice. Nao's mother is constantly absent from the house, busy with her new job at a publishing firm, which she has taken up to compensate for her husband's unemployment.

Unable to find hope for the future in her current circumstances, Nao is considering suicide when she first starts writing her diary at a French maid café in Akihabara. Before she takes her own life, Nao is determined to document the life of her great-grandmother Jiko, a Buddhist nun who is more than one hundred years old. Nao finds comfort in writing in her diary, addressing an imagined reader and friend.

Nao becomes distracted while she is writing the diary, however, and what she actually ends up doing is capturing her own life to readers. Her diary entries cover a broad range of topics, and are characterized by their non-linear chronology; she jumps back in time to describe events that have taken place further back in the past, and makes frequent interjections – both to speak to the reader, and to send text messages to her grandmother.

However, things begin to seem more positive after Nao spends a summer with her grandmother in Sendai. Jiko introduces Nao to new concepts such as zazen, helping her to seek spiritual solace from her turbulent daily life and allowing her to gain the psychological strength necessary to deal with difficult circumstances. Through Jiko, Nao also forms a stronger connection to Japan. While Nao is in Sendai, she unravels some of her family history, finding out about her great-uncle's involvement in World War II.

On the other side of the Pacific, Ruth, a novelist living on a small island off the coast of British Columbia, finds a Hello Kitty lunchbox washed ashore on the beach—possibly debris from the tsunami that struck Japan in 2011. Inside is Nao's diary, and Ruth becomes heavily invested in her narrative, and in finding out Nao's fate. Due to the geographic seclusion and rural setting of her home, Ruth feels isolated from the rest of the world. She feels a strong connection to Nao and yearns to locate her in the real world to affirm her wellbeing. Ruth succeeds in finding several traces of Nao's father and great-grandmother online; however, her efforts to do so are continually thwarted. Ruth's attempts to find Nao eventually culminate in a curious convergence between the two worlds.

== Main characters ==
- Nao Yasutani – one of the protagonists of the novel, a 16-year-old native Nisei (second-generation Japanese American immigrant) Californian girl.
- Jiko Yasutani – Nao's great-grandmother, who is a Zen Buddhist. An anarchist, feminist, and novelist, who was also a "new Woman of the Taisho era".
- Haruki #1 – Nao's great-uncle, a WWII soldier who supposedly died while carrying out a kamikaze mission over the Pacific.
- Haruki #2 (or Harry Yasutani) – Nao's father who had a prestigious job at Silicon Valley, but is fired from his job and loses most of his savings after the Dot-com bubble burst, prompting him and his family to move to Tokyo. He is obsessed with making computer science more in line with having a conscience.
- Ruth – the other protagonist of the novel. A novelist facing the problem of writer's block.
- Oliver – Ruth's husband, who is an environmental artist.
- Schrödinger (also known as Pest or Pesto) – Ruth and Oliver's cat.

== Awards and nominations (selected) ==
- 2015 Yasnaya Polyana Literary Award for Foreign Literature, from The Leo Tolstoy Museum and Estate, for A Tale for the Time Being. Ozeki was the first international recipient of this award.
- 2015 International IMPAC Dublin Award (Fiction) longlist.
- 2014 Dos Passos Prize.
- 2014 Medici Book Club Prize.
- 2014 Canada-Japan Literary Award.
- 2014 The Sunburst Award for Excellence in Canadian Literature of the Fantastic.
- 2013 Man Booker Prize shortlist. Ozeki was the first practicing Zen Buddhist priest to be shortlisted for the Man Booker.
- 2013 National Book Critics Circle Award (Fiction) shortlist.
- 2013 The Kitschies Red Tentacle for best novel.
- 2013 Los Angeles Times Book Prize for Fiction.
