= Dark Edge =

Japanese manga series

- Cover of the first Japanese volume

ダーク・エッジ (Dāku Ejji)
- Manga
- Written by: Yu Aikawa
- Published by: MediaWorks
- English publisher: NA: ComicsOne DrMaster
- Magazine: Dengeki Comic Gao!
- Original run: 1998 – 2006
- Volumes: 15

Dark Edge (Japanese: ダーク・エッジ, Hepburn: Dāku Ejji) is a horror manga series created by Yu Aikawa. It focuses on a teenage boy, Kuro Takagi, and the people surrounding him. The story starts shortly after his mother's death.

== Plot ==
Following the death of his mother, Kuro Takagi transfers to Yotsuji Private High School where the headmaster is his father. The school has a rule forbidding students from being on campus after sunset. When Kuro and some of his classmates break this rule on their first day of attendance, they find themselves victims of a zombie attack. Although students manage to escape, this becomes the first of many such encounters with zombies, and a prelude to Kuro discovering his own zombie abilities, as well as family ties previously unknown to him.

== Characters ==
- Kuro Takagi - The hero of this horror manga, he's afraid of the dark. His mother attempts to tell him of something while on her deathbed but dies first. While his relatives debate where he is to stay he is approached and invited to his father's school, leading Kuro to an academy that teaches folklore and dark arts history in place of math and other academics. Later on he gains a spirit creature named Pochi.
- "Lady" Mao Toyama - Kuro's (unbeknownst to him) long lost sister. Being highly spiritually aware, she is able to summon a butterfly-alien familiar named "Neferti," and can transform her into a sword. Craves attention from her father, who has decided to focus on her brother Kuro instead. She is thus filled with contempt for Kuro.
- Kuro and Mao's father - The unnamed headmaster of the school, he gave his son a ring which will allow him to strengthen his powers, yet also attract Succubi and Nosferatu. He created the school in an effort to strengthen the remnants of the monster species that was nearly wiped out two decades ago by "Carriers." Apparently wants his son dead, and treats his daughter more like a pet than family.
- Miki Akasaka - A girl with a fiery personality and friend of Kana Okamoto. She is willing to do anything to have her friend return to her normal human state.
- Kana Okamoto - The first character to die in the series, she fell in love with Mr Tsuchiya the biology teacher, and ended up becoming a zombie after her corpse was implanted with "evil genes."
- Louie Nishiwaki - A smart and strong boy born to a Japanese father and African-American mother, he was often excluded from group activities in his youth due to his dark skin. He's also afraid of blood, and faints at first sight of it.
- Akimi Shimizu - A girl with light-colored hair and upbeat personality, she is madly in love with Mr. Tsuchiya, a confirmed "nosferatu." Her love for him continues even after she found out about her teacher and his experiment on Kana Okamoto.
- Ise Tetsuzo - A dark-skinned boy with a twin sister in the hospital, he is willing to become a Nosferatu in order to discover the secret of immortality. He is dating a middle school girl and plays in a rock band. He's the series resident "bad boy."
- Mr. Tsuchiya / John Garous - The school's biology teacher, and secretly the last remaining member of the Nosferatu (monsters that, in Dark Edge, look like classical depictions of the devil). Kana Okamoto fell madly in love with him, so Garous turned her into a zombie. Currently the manga's main antagonist.
- Sonobe - A new teacher, and member of the Succubus race. Has a youthful appearance and is obsessed with drinking Kuro's blood.
- "Carriers" - Humans with magical powers, these Carriers were the ones responsible for bringing the Nosferatu race to the brink of extinction back in the 1980s.

== Manga ==
Dark Edge, written and illustrated by Yu Aikawa, was serialized in the publisher MediaWorks' magazine Dengeki Comic Gao! from June 27, 1998, to February 27, 2006. The series was collected into fifteen tankōbon published between March 15, 1999, and April 15, 2006. It was republished by Gentosha in a five-volume bunkoban edition between January 24, 2013, and July 24, 2013.

== Radio drama ==
A radio drama starring Tomokazu Seki was broadcast on Nippon Cultural Broadcasting's Dengeki Taishō in October 1999. Its eleven episodes were published into two CDs produced by Pioneer LDC and distributed by Marine Entertainment; titled Hajimari no Yorei (はじまりの予鈴; lit. 'The beginning of the first bell'), the first CD was released on December 15, 1999, and the second on February 16, 2000.
