= Ruth Ozeki =

American writer (born 1956)

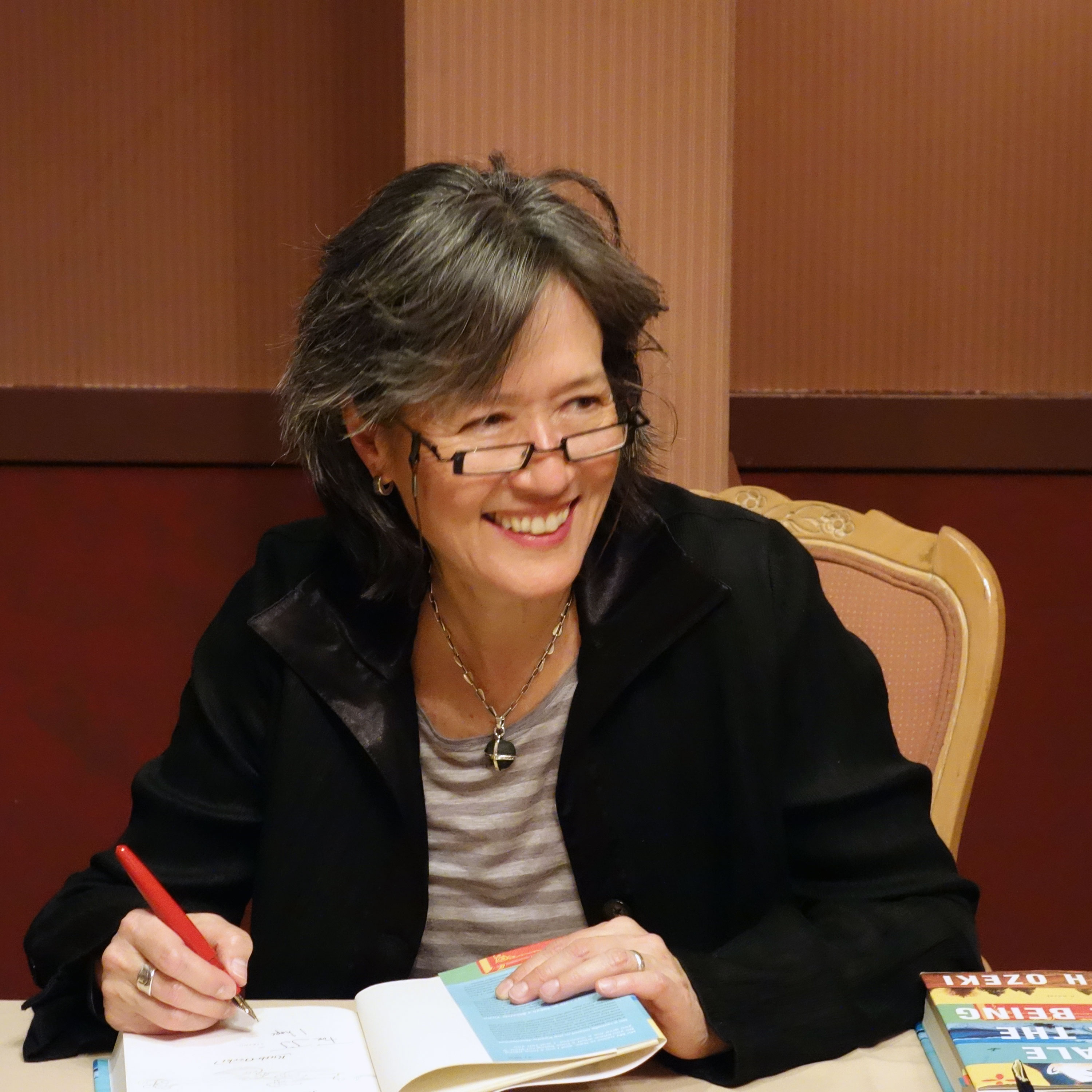
- Ozeki signing books at Hotel la Rose in Santa Rosa, March 21, 2013.
- Born: Ruth Diana Lounsbury; March 12, 1956 (age 70); New Haven, Connecticut, U.S.
- Education: Smith College (BA)
- Occupations: Novelist; filmmaker; professor
- Writing career
- Notable works: My Year of Meats (1998); All Over Creation (2003); A Tale for the Time Being (2013)
- Website: www.ruthozeki.com

Ruth Diana Lounsbury (born March 12, 1956), better known as Ruth Ozeki, is an American author, filmmaker and Zen Buddhist priest. Her books and films, including the novels My Year of Meats (1998), All Over Creation (2003), A Tale for the Time Being (2013), and The Book of Form and Emptiness (2021), seek to integrate personal narrative and social issues, and deal with themes relating to science, technology, environmental politics, race, religion, war and global popular culture.

Her novels have been translated into more than thirty languages. She teaches creative writing at Smith College, where she is the Grace Jarcho Ross 1933 Professor of Humanities in the Department of English Language and Literature.

== Early life and education ==
Ozeki was born on March 12, 1956. She grew up in New Haven, Connecticut, and is the daughter of the American linguist, anthropologist and Mayanist scholar Floyd Lounsbury and the linguist Masako Yokoyama. Her father is European-American and her mother is Japanese. In 1980, she graduated from Smith College with a B.A. in English and Asian Studies, and upon graduation, she received a Japanese Ministry of Education Fellowship (Monbukagakusho) to do graduate work at Nara Women's University.

== Career ==
=== Film and television ===
In 1985, Ozeki moved to New York City and began working as an art director and production designer for low-budget horror movies, including Mutant Hunt (1987) and Robot Holocaust (1986). In 1988, she began working for Telecom Staff, a Japanese production company, coordinating, producing and directing documentary-style programs for Japanese TV. During this time, she directed episodes of See the World by Train and co-produced the pilot for the TV documentary miniseries Fishing With John (1991), starring musician John Lurie and director Jim Jarmusch. Ozeki's first film, Body of Correspondence (1994), made in collaboration with artist Marina Zurkow, won the New Visions Award at the San Francisco Film Festival and was aired on PBS.

Ozeki's second film, Halving the Bones (1995), tells the autobiographical story of her journey as she brings her grandmother's remains home from Japan. It was nominated for the Grand Jury Prize at the Sundance Film Festival, and screened at the Museum of Modern Art, the Montreal World Film Festival, and the Margaret Mead Film Festival, among others.

=== Writing ===
Ozeki's debut novel My Year of Meats (Viking Penguin, 1998), based on her work in Japanese television, tells the story of two women, living on opposite sides of the world, whose lives are connected by a TV cooking show. My Year of Meats was awarded the 1998 Kiriyama Prize and the 1998 Imus/Barnes & Noble American Book Award. Her second novel, All Over Creation (Viking Penguin, 2003), focuses on a potato-farming family in Idaho and an environmental activist group opposing the use of GMOs. Author Michael Pollan called All Over Creation "a smart compelling novel about a world we don't realize we live in." All Over Creation received the 2003 WILLA Literary Award for Contemporary Fiction and the 2004 American Book Award from the Before Columbus Foundation.

Ozeki's 2013 novel, A Tale for the Time Being (Viking Penguin) tells the story of a mysterious diary written by a troubled schoolgirl in Tokyo that has washed ashore on the Pacific Northwest coast of Canada in the wake of the 2011 Japanese earthquake and tsunami. The diary is discovered by a novelist named Ruth, who becomes obsessed with discovering the girl's fate. Junot Diaz called this novel Ozeki's "absolute best—bewitching, intelligent, hilarious, and heartbreaking, often on the same page." The novel was awarded the 2013 Los Angeles Times Book Prize for Fiction, and named the first recipient of the 2015 Yasnaya Polyana Literary Award (founded by the Leo Tolstoy Museum & Estate and Samsung Electronics) for the Best Foreign Novel of the 21st century. The book has received several other national and international awards, and has been published in more than thirty countries.

In her first work of personal nonfiction, The Face: A Time Code (Restless Books, 2016), Ozeki writes about a three-hour observation experiment, in which she studied her reflection in a mirror and kept a log of thoughts that arose during that time. The Face: A Time Code was published as part of Restless Books' groundbreaking series, The Face, featuring authors Tash Aw and Chris Abani.

In 2021, Ozeki released her fourth novel The Book of Form and Emptiness. About a 14-year-old boy who begins to hear voices emanating from things in the house after the death of his father, the book won the Women's Prize for Fiction in June 2022.

=== Teaching ===
From 1982 through 1985, Ozeki taught in the English department at Kyoto Sangyo University and founded an English language school in Kyoto, Japan. Currently, she is the Grace Jarcho Ross 1933 Professor of Humanities in the Department of English Language and Literature at Smith College in Northampton, Massachusetts.

=== Zen ===
Ozeki was ordained as a Soto Zen Buddhist priest in 2010; she practices Zen Buddhism with Zoketsu Norman Fischer. She is the editor of the website Everyday Zen.

== Personal life ==
Ozeki divides her time among Northampton, Massachusetts; New York, New York; and Cortes Island, British Columbia. She is married to the German-Canadian environmental artist Oliver Kellhammer, who teaches on the faculty of Sustainable Systems at Parsons School of Design in New York City.

Her legal name is Ruth Diana Lounsbury. Ozeki is a nom de plume, taken from her former boyfriend's last name, and chosen to better represent her mixed ethnic heritage.

== Awards and honors (selected) ==
- 1994: International Documentary Association's Distinguished Achievement Award for Halving the Bones
- 1994: Kodak Award for Creative Use of Cinematography for Halving the Bones
- 1994: San Francisco Film & Video Festival, New Visions Award for Body of Correspondence
- 1998: Kiriyama Prize for My Year of Meats
- 1998: Imus/Barnes & Noble American Book Award for My Year of Meats
- 2003: WILLA Literary Award for Contemporary Fiction for All Over Creation
- 2004: American Book Award for All Over Creation
- 2013: Man Booker Prize shortlist for A Tale for the Time Being. Ozeki was the first practicing Zen Buddhist priest to be shortlisted for the Man Booker.
- 2013: Los Angeles Times Book Prize (Fiction) winner for A Tale for the Time Being
- 2013: Kitschies Red Tentacle Prize (UK) for A Tale for the Time Being
- 2014: Canada-Japan Literary Award for A Tale for the Time Being
- 2014: Dos Passos Prize for A Tale for the Time Being
- 2014: Medici Book Club Prize for A Tale for the Time Being
- 2014: National Book Critics Circle Award (Fiction) shortlist for A Tale for the Time Being
- 2014: Sunburst Award for A Tale for the Time Being
- 2015: International Dublin Literary Award longlist for A Tale for the Time Being
- 2015: Yasnaya Polyana Literary Award for A Tale for the Time Being. Ozeki was the first international recipient of this award.
- 2022: Women's Prize for Fiction winner for The Book of Form and Emptiness.

== Works ==
=== Novels ===
- —— (1998). My Year of Meats. Penguin. ISBN 9780140280463.
- —— (2003). All Over Creation. Penguin. ISBN 9780142003893.
- —— (2013). A Tale for the Time Being. Viking. ISBN 9780670026630.
- —— (2021). The Book of Form and Emptiness. Viking. ISBN 9780399563645.
- —— (2026). The Typing Lady. Viking. ISBN 9780593832714.

=== Autobiography ===
- —— (2016). The Face: A Time Code. Restless Books. ISBN 9781632060525.

=== Anthology appearances and contributions ===
- Hagedorn, Jessica, ed. (2003). "Ships in the Night". Charlie Chan 2: A Home in the World. Penguin. ISBN 9780142003909.
- Layne, Kathy, ed. (2006). "Foreword". Inside and Other Short Fiction: Japanese Women by Japanese Women. Kodansha USA. ISBN 9784770030061.
- Prasad, Chandra, ed. (2006). "The Anthropologists' Kids". Mixed: An Anthology of Short Fiction on the Multiracial Experience. W.W. Norton. ISBN 9780393327861.
- McLeod, Melvin, ed. (2009). "The Art of Losing: On Writing, Dying, and Mom". The Best Buddhist Writing 2009. Shambhala Publications. ISBN 9781590307342.

== Filmography ==
=== Films ===
- Body of Correspondence. 1994.
- Halving the Bones. 1995.
