= Leon Serafim =

American academic

Leon Angelo Serafim (born May 23, 1945) is a retired American academic. He is a Japanologist, historical linguist, and professor emeritus of the University of Hawaiʻi at Mānoa.

Serafim is credited with coining the term "Japonic languages", now widely accepted among linguists, to identify the language family of which Japanese and the Ryukyuan languages are members.

== Early life ==
Serafim earned a B.A. in Oriental Languages at the University of California, Berkeley in 1968, followed by an M.A. in East Asian Languages at University of Hawaiʻi at Mānoa in 1976. His Ph.D. in Linguistics was conferred by Yale University in 1984.

== Career ==
Serafim was a member of the faculty of the Department of East Asian Languages and Literatures at the University of Hawaiʻi at Mānoa for many years, and was associated with the University's Center for Japanese Studies.

Serafim was the founding Director of the Center for Okinawan Studies. His on-going research investigates the relationship of changes in language, culture, and demography of the Ryukyus.

== Selected works ==
In a statistical overview derived from writings by and about Leon Serafim, OCLC/WorldCat encompasses roughly 6 works in 10+ publications in 2 languages and 100 library holdings.

- Shodon: the Prehistory of a Northern Ryukyuan Dialect of Japanese (1984)
- Early Japanese Vocalism and Vowel Concord (1976)
