= Kure Project =

The Kure Project was a welfare, counseling and educational program run by International Social Service Japan (ISSJ) in the city of Kure, Hiroshima Prefecture, between 1960 and 1977 for the mixed-race offspring of Allied servicemen and Japanese women born during and soon after the postwar Occupation of Japan.

== Background ==
Kure had been the headquarters of the British Commonwealth Occupation Force (BCOF) between 1946 and 1952 and continued to be used by the British Commonwealth Forces Korea until 1956. Servicemen from Australia, the U.K., New Zealand, India and (from 1950) Canada were either based at or used facilities in Kure.

== Origins and funding ==
The Kure Project was initially funded from private sources including American and Australian Christian churches concerned by the plight of the children, many of whom had been abandoned by their fathers and were suffering from poverty and discrimination. In the decade from 1962 about half the annual budget was met from grants made by the Australian Government. A further important source of revenue was the A. J. Ferguson Memorial Fund established in 1964 in honour of a Melbourne businessman, Alex Ferguson, who had done much to bring the issue before the Australian public.

== Results ==
It has been estimated around 10,000 mixed-race children were left in Japan after the Occupation. The Kure Project provided long-term assistance to 127 clients. Social workers organised group activities to help the children overcome social prejudice resulting from their disadvantaged backgrounds, obvious physical differences and negative community attitudes to women who were involved with occupation troops. Scholarships and living allowances enabled some individuals to continue their studies through to senior high school and university, a result rare for other mixed-race children born in similar circumstances elsewhere in Japan.

== The Kure Project and inter-country adoption ==
In the decade following the end of the Occupation in 1952, more than 2,000 mixed-race children were adopted abroad from Japan. Most had been born in or near Tokyo, Osaka and Yokohama where the bulk of the U.S. military forces were based. ISSJ also arranged 15 inter-country adoptions from Kure between 1958 and 1965, in all but one case to families in the United States. The Australian Government refused to allow the entry of the half-Japanese children to Australia because of the country's restrictive immigration ("White Australia") policy, which was not abolished until 1972.
