= All Over Creation =

Book by Ruth Ozeki

- Author: Ruth Ozeki
- Language: English
- Genre: Novel
- Publisher: Penguin
- Publication date: 2003
- Publication place: United States
- Pages: 433 (second edition)
- ISBN: 978-0-14-200389-3 (second edition)
- OCLC: 762170557
- Dewey Decimal: 813.6
- LC Class: PS3565.Z45 A79 2004

All Over Creation is a novel by Ruth Ozeki about Yumi Fuller, the Japanese-American daughter of a potato farmer in Idaho who returns home as an adult to care for her parents, Lloyd and Momoko, and stumbles into the growing controversy around genetically modified food (GMOs). The book was first published in 2003 by Viking Press and reprinted by Penguin in 2004.

== Overview ==
Yumi hasn't been back to Liberty Falls, Idaho—epicenter of the potato-farming industry—since she left home at fifteen-years-old. Over two decades later, she's returned to see her dying parents and she gets swept up in a new and unexpected drama. The farming community has been invaded by Agribusiness forces at war with an activist group, the Seeds of Resistance, who travel the United States in a camper, "The Spudnik," biofueled by stolen McDonald's French-fry oil. The novel presents an examination of corporate life, globalization, political resistance, youth culture, and aging baby boomers. It also celebrates the beauty of seeds, roots, and growth—and the universal capacity for renewal.

== Awards ==
- American Book Award
- New York Times Notable Book
- WILLA Literary Award for Contemporary Fiction

== Reviews ==
- Guardian
- New York Times
