= Hafu (film) =

2013 Japanese documentary film

- Film poster
- Directed by: Megumi Nishikura, Lara Perez Takagi
- Written by: Marcia Yumi Lise; David Mitsuaki Yano
- Produced by: Megumi Nishikura; Lara Perez Takagi
- Starring: David Mitsuaki Yano; Gabriela Oi; Alex Oi; Sophia Fukunishi; Fusae Miyako; Tetsuya Oi; Sara Oi; Edward Yutaka Sumoto
- Edited by: Aika Miyake
- Music by: Winton White, Winchester Niitete Boye
- Production company: Distribber
- Distributed by: Prime Video, Vimeo On Demand
- Release date: April 5, 2013 (U.S.)
- Running time: 90 minutes
- Country: Japan
- Languages: English, Japanese

Hafu: The Mixed-Race Experience in Japan is a 2013 Japanese documentary film that explores the intricacies of mixed-race, ethnically half Japanese people called hāfu and their multicultural experiences in modern Japan. The film featured hāfu people share their experiences. Such as those who've lived their whole life in Japan. Or those who arrived later in life and others are in between. The contrast between Japanese and other cultures can be akin to two different worlds. It sheds light on what it is like to be multiracial and multicultural in a homogeneous Japan. It seeks to answer the question what does it mean to be hāfu? What does it mean to be Japanese, and what does it mean for Japan?

The making of this documentary took 3 years of research, interviews and filming. It was completed in April 2013. The documentary is in Japanese with English subtitles and English with Japanese subtitles. Some protagonists talk in English.

== Synopsis ==
An estimated 1 in 49 marriages are international marriages in Japan. The majority of international marriages are between Japanese and Chinese, Filipino or Korean people. The documentary follows the lives of five ethnic half-Japanese people. It is narrated by themselves, it includes interviews and cinéma vérité. David Mitsuaki Yano is Ghanaian and Japanese. He seeks to reconcile his mostly Japanese childhood with his mother's country Ghana. He wants to build a school in Ghana and thereby connects with his Japanese community. Sophia Fukunishi is half Australian and Japanese. She moved to Tokyo at 27 years old and has obstacles with trying to assimilate into a very different Japanese culture. The Mexican-Japanese Oi family with Gabriela, Alex, Tetsuya and Sara share the challenge of raising multi-lingual, multi-cultural children in Japan. The older son Alex has difficulty integrating into his school and suffers from bullying. Edward Yutaka Sumoto is Venezuelan and Japanese. He struggled with his hāfu identity and the disconnect with Japanese culture. He now actively works to promote multicultural awareness in Japan. Fusae Miyako is Korean and Japanese. She can easily blend into Japanese society due to looking just like an average Japanese person. So she is not easily identified as hāfu on the spot. Fusae was led to believe she was entirely Japanese until discovering otherwise in her mid-teens. As the personal stories are told of the five protagonists, it is discovered that they each have different personal experiences, struggles and accomplishments. There's also diversity among them due to factors such as family, relationships, education, appearance, language skills and upbringing.

== Reception ==
The documentary had a generally positive reception. On the online database IMDb the average score is 7.2/10 with 147 reviews. On Amazon Prime Video it has 76 reviews with an average rating of 4.6 out of 5 stars.

== See also ==
- Demographics of Japan
- Culture of Japan
- Hāfu
