= My Year of Meats =

1998 debut novel by Ruth Ozeki

- First edition cover
- Author: Ruth Ozeki
- Language: English
- Genre: Novel
- Publisher: Viking Press
- Publication date: June 1, 1998 (first edition)
- Publication place: United States
- Pages: 432 (first edition)
- ISBN: 978-0-670-87904-5 (first edition)
- OCLC: 38168295
- Dewey Decimal: 813/.54 21
- LC Class: PS3565.Z45 M99 1998

My Year of Meats is the 1998 debut novel by Ruth Ozeki. The book comments on the differences between Japanese and American culture, as well as industrial agriculture and the meat industry.

== Overview ==
Jane Takagi-Little is a Japanese-American documentary filmmaker who is hired to work for a Japanese production company, where she uncovers some unsavory truths about love, fertility, and a dangerous hormone called DES. The company works with BEEF-EX to promote the use of American beef in Japan by creating a Japanese television show called My American Wife!.

Parallel to Jane's story is the life of Akiko Ueno, a former manga artist who specialized in horror scenes and is reluctantly married to Joichi "John" Ueno, who works for BEEF-EX. John cares only that Akiko has a baby and forces her to watch My American Wife and cook the recipes, believing that it will allow her to conceive. However, as Akiko's independence and sense of self grows from watching the show and cooking for John, her relationship with John becomes violent.

The book switches point of view from Jane Takagi-Little and Akiko Ueno.

== Awards ==
- Kiriyama Prize
- Imus/Barnes and Noble American Book Award

== Reviews ==
- Newsweek
- Chicago Tribune
- Publishers Weekly
