= Hāfu =

Person of partial Japanese ancestry

Hāfu (Japanese: ハーフ; lit. "Half") is a Japanese language term used to refer to a person born in Japan with half Asian and half non-Asian ancestry. The word can also be used to describe anyone with mixed-racial ancestry in general. As many consider Japan to be one of the most homogeneous societies on the planet, children who have one non-Japanese parent are called hāfu Japanese and often face prejudice and discrimination from Japanese citizens of full Japanese descent. Hāfu individuals are well represented in Japanese media and abroad, and according to estimates from Japan’s Ministry of Health, Labour and Welfare in the 2010s, 1 in 30 children born in Japan are born to interracial couples with one non-Japanese parent. As of 2023, 15,120 children (2.1%) were born in Japan to parents of whom one held foreign nationality.

== In Japanese ==
- Daburu (ダブル, lit. double) – A daburu is an alternative to Hāfu that focuses on the positive connotations of two cultures instead of one.
- Konketsuji (混血児, lit. mixed-blood child) – A konketsuji is a Japanese person with one non-Japanese parent. It is considered a derogatory term.

== History ==
=== Prehistoric to feudal Japan ===
Hāfu refers to a person who has one ethnic Japanese parent and one non-ethnic Japanese parent. The term ethnic Japanese refers to the Indigenous Japanese people of the Japanese archipelago. Over the course of centuries, the minority ethnic groups such as the Ainu and Ryukyuans were mostly assimilated into the Yamato population. Mixed race couples and thus hāfu people were rare in feudal Japan. There were mixed Asian couples between ethnic Japanese and other East and Southeast Asian peoples.

The most well-regarded theory is that present-day Yamato Japanese are descendants of both the Indigenous Jōmon people and the immigrant Yayoi people. The Yayoi were an admixture (1,000 BCE–300 CE) of migrants from East Asia, mostly China and the Korean peninsula.

Modern mainland Yamato Japanese have less than 20% Jomon people's genomes. In modern Japan, the term Yamato minzoku is seen as antiquated for connoting racial notions that have been discarded in many circles since Japan's surrender in World War II. The term "Japanese people" or even "Japanese-Japanese" are often used instead.

Genetic and anthropological studies indicate that the Ryukyuans are significantly related to the Ainu people and share the ancestry with the indigenous prehistoric Jōmon period (pre 10,000–1,000 BCE) people, who arrived from Southeast Asia and with the Yamato people. During the Meiji period, the Ryukyuans' distinct culture was suppressed by the Meiji government and faced forced assimilation.

=== Early modern period ===
==== Edo period (1603–1867) ====
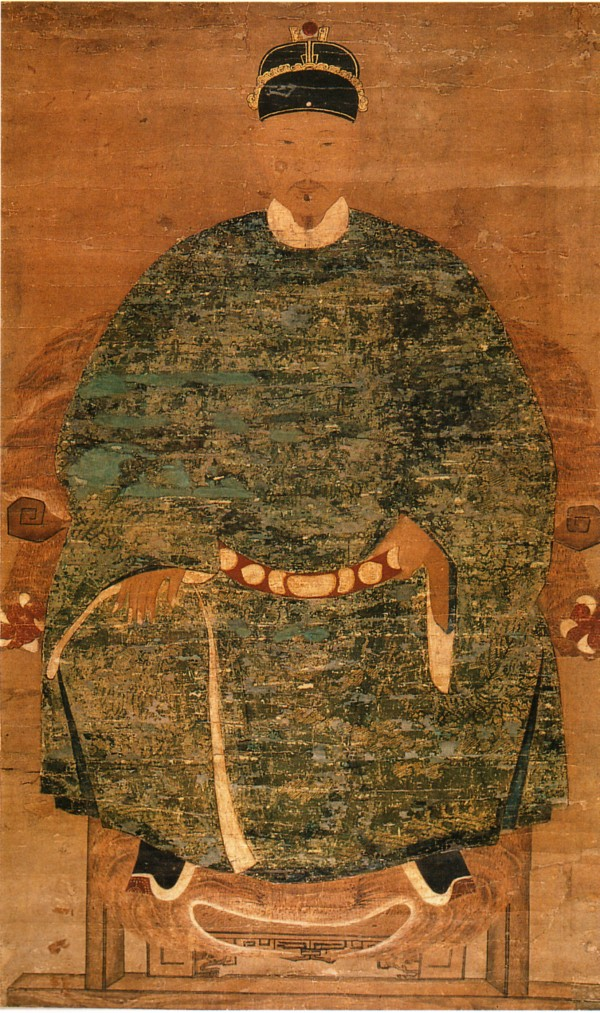
Koxinga was a Chinese monarch who was hāfu Japanese.

English sailor William Adams, a navigator for the Dutch East India Company, settled in Japan in April 1600. He was ultimately granted the rank of samurai, one of the few non-Japanese to do so. He wed Oyuki (お雪), a Japanese woman and together, they had two children, Joseph and Susanna, who were hāfu.

Chinese military leader Chenggong Zheng, historically known as Koxinga (1624–1662), was hāfu, born in Japan to a Japanese mother and Chinese father and raised there until the age of seven, known by the Japanese given name, Fukumatsu.

=== Modern period ===
==== Meiji, Taishō and pre-war Shōwa period (1868–1945) ====
Since 1899, the Ainu were increasingly marginalized. During a period of only 36 years, the Ainu went from being a relatively isolated group of people to having their land, language, religion and customs assimilated into those of the Japanese. Intermarriage between Japanese and Ainu was actively promoted by the Ainu to lessen the chances of discrimination against their offspring. As a result, many Ainu are indistinguishable from their Japanese neighbors, but some Ainu Japanese are interested in traditional Ainu culture.

The first visible usage of the term Hāfu dates to 1930, in the novel Machi No Kokusai Mune (街の國際娘, lit. International Girl in the City) by Japanese author Touma Kitabayashi (北林 透馬). In the chapter Minato no Sakaba no Ainoko Odoriko (港の酒場の混血児踊り子, lit. The Dancing In-Between Child at the Harbour Bar) the furigana Hāfu is used as a synonym for the term "konketsuji" predating the appearance of Hāfu in dictionaries, which would not occur until after 1973.

=== Contemporary period ===
==== Shōwa period (post-war) (1945–1989) ====
The presence of the United States Armed Forces in Japan and Asia saw the birth of many children born to American fathers; these children were called Amerasians. It's estimated that by 1952, anywhere from 5,000 to 10,000 Japanese children were fathered by American servicemen, with many of the children placed for adoption by their Japanese mothers due to the stigma of out-of-wedlock pregnancy and miscegenation and the struggles of supporting a child alone in post-war Japan.

One orphanage, Seibo Aijien (聖母愛児園, Seibo Aijien, Our Lady of Lourdes Orphanage), in Yokohama, run by Franciscan nuns, opened in 1946. By 1948, staff members were caring for 126 children fathered by American servicemen, and 136 children by 1950. A letter, dated 1948, detailed an incident of a malnourished infant born to a Japanese teenager whose American father refused to support for fear his wife would learn of his extramarital affair. The Elizabeth Saunders Home opened in Ōiso by a Japanese woman named Miki Sawada, cared for more than 700 Amerasian children, none of whom were visited or supported by their American fathers. The Kure Project operated in the city of Kure, Hiroshima Prefecture, between 1960 and 1977 providing long-term assistance to over 100 families with mixed-race children.

==== Heisei period (1989–2019) ====
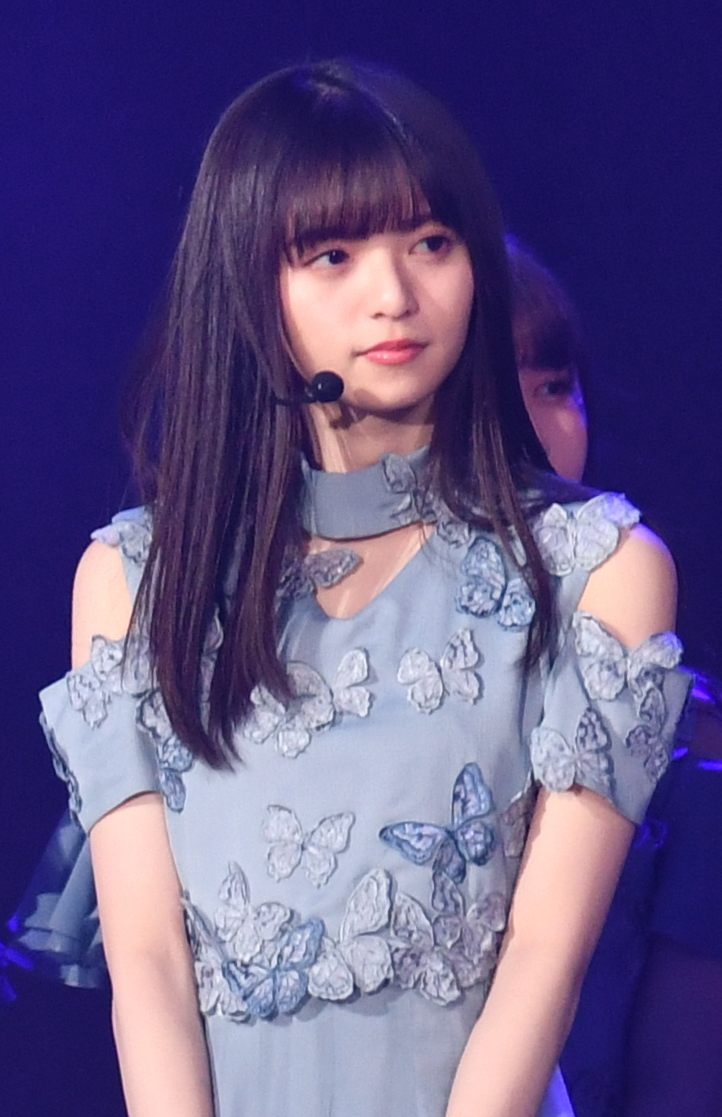
Asuka Saitō, actress, model, television presenter and former idol (Burmese / Japanese)

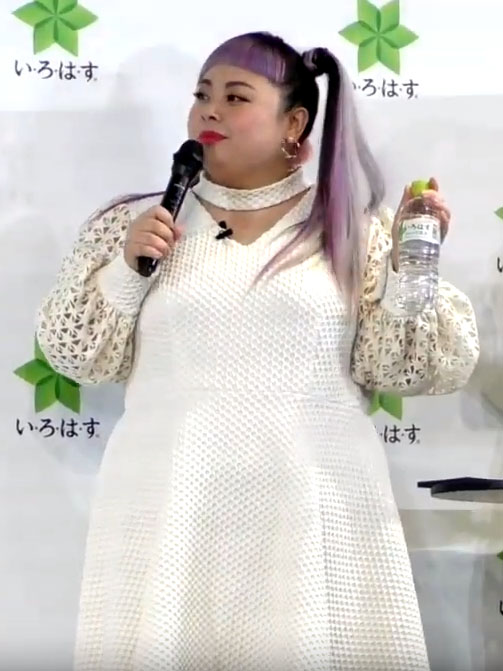
Naomi Watanabe, actress, comedian, fashion designer (Taiwanese / Japanese)

Fashionable images of the half Japanese people have become prominent especially with the increased appearance of hāfu in the Japanese media. Hāfu models are now seen on television or fill the pages of fashion magazines such as Non-no, CanCam and Vivi as often as newsreaders or celebrities. The appearance of hāfu in the media has provided the basis for such a vivid representation of them in the culture. As of 2018, it is estimated that 30% to 40% of runway models in Japanese fashion shows identify as hafu. Most top models in their 20s of popular Japanese fashion magazines are hafu.

===== Ainoko =====
One of the earliest terms referring to half Japanese was ainoko, meaning a child born of a relationship between two races. It is still used in Latin America, most prominently Brazil (where spellings such as ainoco, ainoca (f.) and ainocô may be found), to refer to mestizo (broader term in Hispanic America for mixed race in general) or mestiço people of some Japanese ancestry. In Brazil, amarela (yellow) is used as a census categogy for people of mixed East Asian origin.

The former term evolved to be an umbrella term for Eurasian or mixed East Asian/mestizo, East Asian/African, East Asian/Arab and East Asian/indigenous heritage in general. At the same time it is possible for people with little Japanese or other East Asian ancestry to be perceivable just by their phenotype to identify mostly as black, white or mestizo/pardo instead of ainoko, while people with about a quarter or less of non-East Asian ancestry may identify on the Brazilian census as being amarela ("yellow" or East Asian).

Soon this too became a taboo term due to its derogatory connotations such as illegitimacy and discrimination. What were central to these labels were the emphasis on "blood impurity" and the obvious separation of the half Japanese from the majority of Japanese. Some English-speaking parents of children of mixed ethnicity use the word "double." Amerasian is another term for children of mixed ancestry, especially those born to Japanese mothers and U.S. military fathers.

Ainoko

Of the one million children born in Japan in 2013, 2.2% had one or more non-Japanese parent.^{[70]} According to the Japanese Ministry of Health, Labor and Welfare, one in forty-nine babies born in Japan today are born into families with one non-Japanese parent. Most intermarriages in Japan are between Japanese men and women from other Asian countries, including China, the Philippines and South Korea. Southeast Asia also has significant populations of people with half Japanese ancestry, particularly in the Philippines.

In the 21st century, stereotyping and discrimination against hāfu occurs based on how different their identity, behavior and appearance is from a typical Japanese person. Some experience negative treatment such as being teased or bullied in junior high school, treated like foreigners or stereotyped as bilingual and models. However, being mixed has been increasingly seen more positively. The hafu of international marriages between Japanese and other Asians tend to blend in easier in Japanese society. They can have a bicultural identity. Their foreign side could be suppressed in Japan's homogeneous culture.

Smile (スマイル, Sumairu) is a television drama series, broadcast by TBS from April to June 2009. Jun Matsumoto plays the lead role of Vito, a half-Filipino, half-Japanese man who always smiles despite all of the problems and difficulties he faces. The series focused on foreigners and mixed race children who suffered from racism.

The documentary film Hafu: The Mixed-Race Experience in Japan was released in April 2013. It is about the experiences of five hāfu living in Japan. It deals with issues of identity, multiculturalism, relationships, hardship and stereotyping that they face.

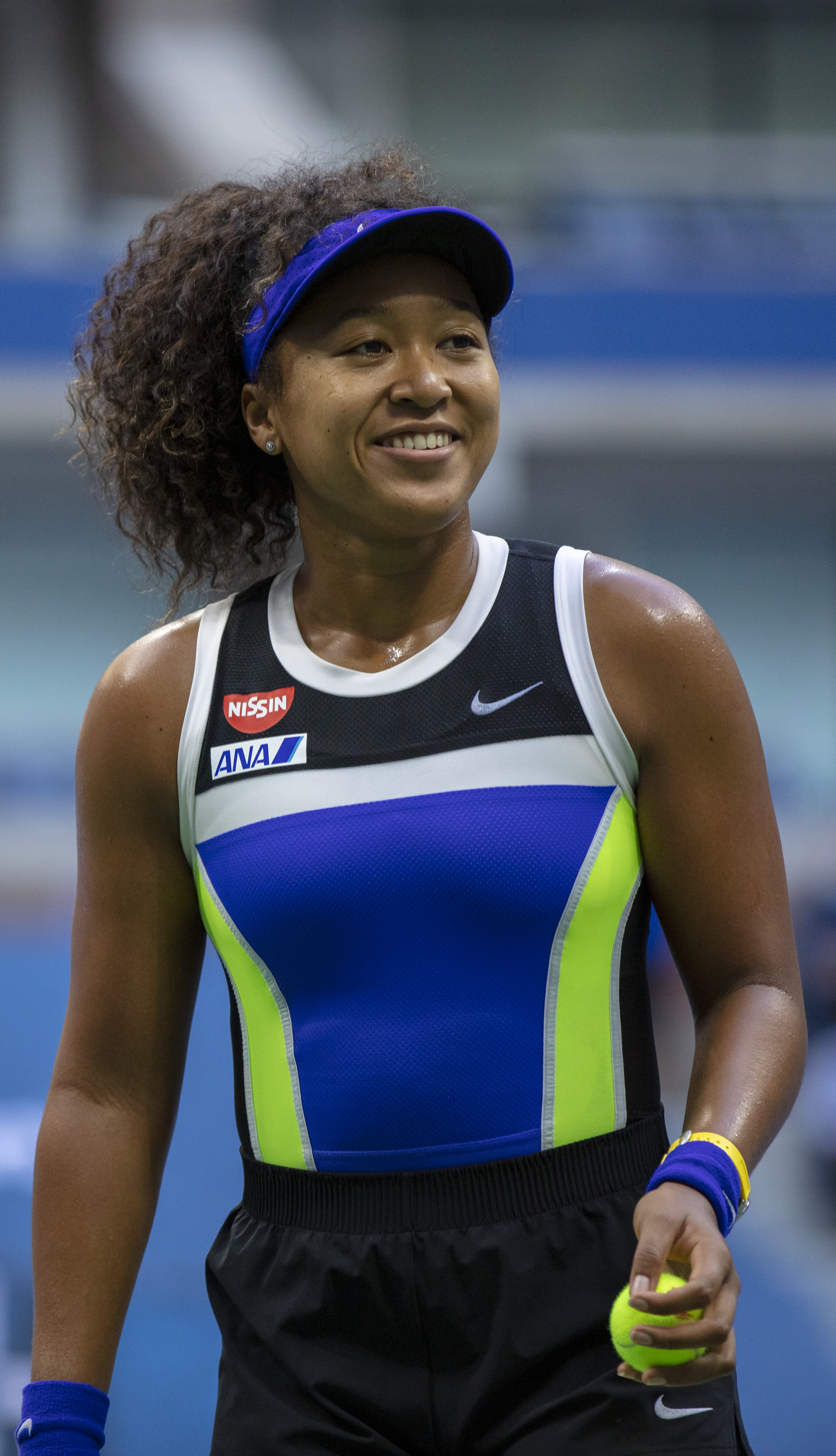
Naomi Osaka, tennis player (Haitian / Japanese)

In September 2018, Naomi Osaka is the first Japanese woman and hāfu to contest a Grand Slam singles final and the first Japanese Grand Slam singles champion. Naomi Osaka is the winner of the 2018 US Open Women's Singles.

==== Reiwa period (2019–) ====
Due to low birthrate, the population of Japan is aging significantly. As of 2019, the fertility rate stood at 1.36 children per woman, far below the 2.1 children per woman required to maintain the same level of population. Japan had 126.5 million people in 2018, with Japanese nationals numbering 124.8 million in January 2019. Currently, 1 in 4 Japanese residents are over the age of 65, meaning that if the birthrate does not increase, one-third of the population will be above this age by 2050.

The percentage of hāfu is increasing, but the group is still a minority in Japan. The Government of Japan regards all naturalized Japanese citizens and native-born Japanese nationals with multi-ethnic backgrounds as Japanese, with no official ethnicity census data.

== Statistics ==
=== Births ===
Source: Ministry of Health, Labour and Welfare

==== Live births in Japan ====
Children whose parents are both foreign nationals, children born out of wedlock to mothers of foreign nationality, and children whose parents, either both or one hold Japanese nationality but who were born overseas are not included.

	Live births to mixed- nationality parents	Live births to two Japanese parents	Total births	Rate of mixed- nationality births (%)
1987	10,022	1,336,636	1,346,658	0.74
1990	13,686	1,207,899	1,221,585	1.12
1995	20,254	1,166,810	1,187,064	1.71
1996	21,064	1,185,491	1,206,555	1.75
1997	21,525	1,170,140	1,191,665	1.81
1998	22,021	1,181,126	1,203,147	1.83
1999	21,464	1,156,205	1,177,669	1.82
2000	22,337	1,168,210	1,190,547	1.88
2001	22,176	1,148,486	1,170,662	1.89
2002	22,251	1,131,604	1,153,855	1.93
2003	21,522	1,102,088	1,123,610	1.92
2004	22,173	1,088,548	1,110,721	2.00
2005	21,873	1,040,657	1,062,530	2.06
2006	23,463	1,069,211	1,092,674	2.15
2007	24,177	1,065,641	1,089,818	2.22
2008	23,956	1,067,200	1,091,156	2.20
2009	22,511	1,047,525	1,070,036	2.10
2010	21,966	1,049,339	1,071,305	2.05
2011	20,311	1,030,496	1,050,807	1.93
2012	20,536	1,016,696	1,037,232	1.98
2013	19,532	1,010,285	1,029,817	1.90
2014	19,649	983,960	1,003,609	1.96
2015	19,079	986,642	1,005,721	1.90
2016	19,124	958,118	977,242	1.96
2017	18,135	928,011	946,146	1.92
2018	17,878	900,522	918,400	1.95
2019	17,403	847,836	865,239	2.01
2020	16,807	824,028	840,835	2.00
2021	16,225	795,397	811,622	2.00
2022	15,271	755,488	770,759	1.98
2023	15,120	712,168	727,288	2.08

==== Births outside Japan ====
Source: Ministry of Health, Labour and Welfare

	Live births to mixed- nationality parents
2015	9,920
2016	9,747
2017	9,152
2018	8,776
2019	8,418
2020	7,697
2021	7,420
2022	7,196
2023	6,782

== See also ==
- Amerasian
- Anglo-Burmese people
- Anglo-Indian people
- Afro-Asians
- Bụi đời
- Burgher people
- Demography of Japan
- Aging of Japan
- Half-caste
- Hapa
- Húnxuěr
- Indo people
- Kristang people
- Luk khrueng
- Mestizo
- Métis
- Castizo

== Bibliography ==
- Hendrickx, Katrien (2007). The Origins of Banana-fibre Cloth in the Ryukyus, Japan. Leuven University Press. ISBN 978-90-5867-614-6.
- Robbeets, Martine (2015). Diachrony of Verb Morphology: Japanese and the Transeurasian Languages. De Gruyter. ISBN 978-3-11-039994-3.
- Serafim, Leon (2008). "The uses of Ryukyuan in understanding Japanese language history". In Frellesvig, Bjarke; Whitman, John (eds.). Proto-Japanese: Issues and Prospects. John Benjamins Publishing. ISBN 978-90-272-4809-1.
