= Highway 613 (Saudi Arabia) =

Road in Saudi Arabia

City Highway 613
- Dhahran–Jubail Expressway

Route information
- Length: 196 km (122 mi)

Major junctions
- South end: Route 617 near Khobar
- North end: Route 7950 near Ra's Al Khair

Location
- Country: Saudi Arabia
- Provinces: Eastern
- Major cities: Dhahran, Dammam, Qatif, Jubail

Highway system
- Transport in Saudi Arabia
| → |

Highway 613 (Arabic: الطريق السريع ٦١٣), popularly known as the Dhahran–Jubail Expressway (Arabic: طريق الظهران–الجبيل السريع) and the Khobar–Dammam–Dhahran Expressway (Arabic: طريق الخبر–الدمام–الظهران السريع), is a major north-south controlled-access secondary highway in the Eastern Province of Saudi Arabia, spanning 196 kilometers (122 mi). It connects the Dammam metropolitan area to the industrial area of Ra's al-Khair, running in the north-south direction for its entire length from Khobar in the south to Ra's al-Khair north of Jubail, while providing access to Qatif and Jubail along its length.

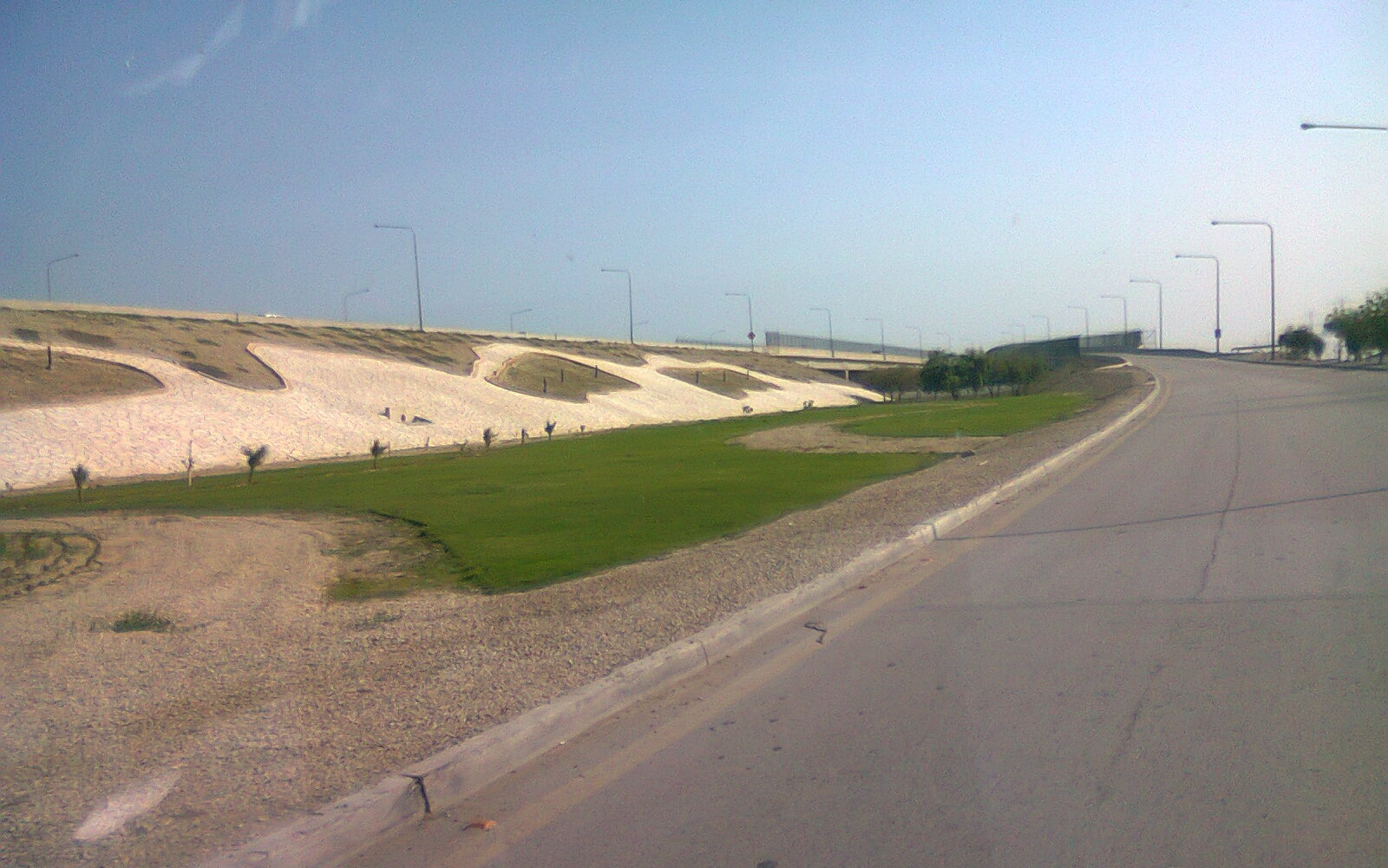
Highway 613 near Jubail

Being a major secondary intercity route in Saudi Arabia, Route 613 consists of three traffic lanes and an emergency lane on each side, with both sides separated by a median strip, for a total of eight lanes. All intersections on the route are grade separated, and it runs parallel to the Persian Gulf for its entire length and is connected to other major highways in the region, along with Highway 40. The expressway is important to both the residents of Greater Dammam and Jubail. It also serves the cities of Qatif and Ra's Tanura along its route.

== Route description ==
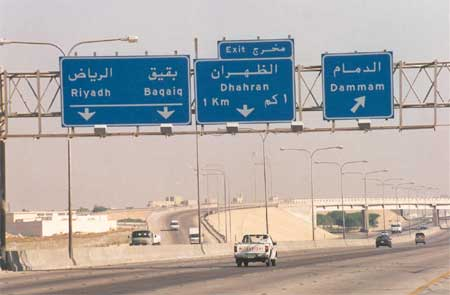
Sign on Highway 613 guiding to Dammam via Highway 619, also known as Doha Road.

Highway 613 (Arabic: الطريق السريع ٦١٣) is a major north-south controlled-access highway in the Eastern Province of Saudi Arabia connecting the Dammam metropolitan area to the industrial cities of Jubail and Ra's Al-Khair. The highway runs along and parallel to the eastern coast of Saudi Arabia and Highway 95, another major highway running in the same direction. The highway spans 196 km (122 mi) between Khobar (at the al-'Aziziyah Municipality roundabout) and Ra's al-Khair (at the intersection with Road 7950) via Dhahran and Dammam, with connections to Saihat, Qatif and Tarout (via Road 6384) and Jubail (via Jubail Expressway 1 and Jubail Expressway 3).

The expressway begins at the roundabout where it intersects Highway 617 near al-'Aziziyah Municipality on the northern tip of the Half Moon Bay. It travels northeast for the first 3 km (2 mi), turning northward and intersecting the Cooperative Council Road (Mashreq Route 80M), which travels eastward and becomes the King Fahd Causeway. It then bends around the eastern boundary of the King Abdulaziz Air Base, before constricting into a tunnel at the intersection with the Custodian of the Two Holy Mosques Road. It then turns westward and intersects Highway 610, which provides access to the King Abdulaziz Airbase and Highway 619, which provides access to Saudi Aramco and the King Fahd University of Petroleum and Minerals. The road then intersects H.E. Ali Naimi Road, which provides access to the King Abdulaziz Center for World Culture.

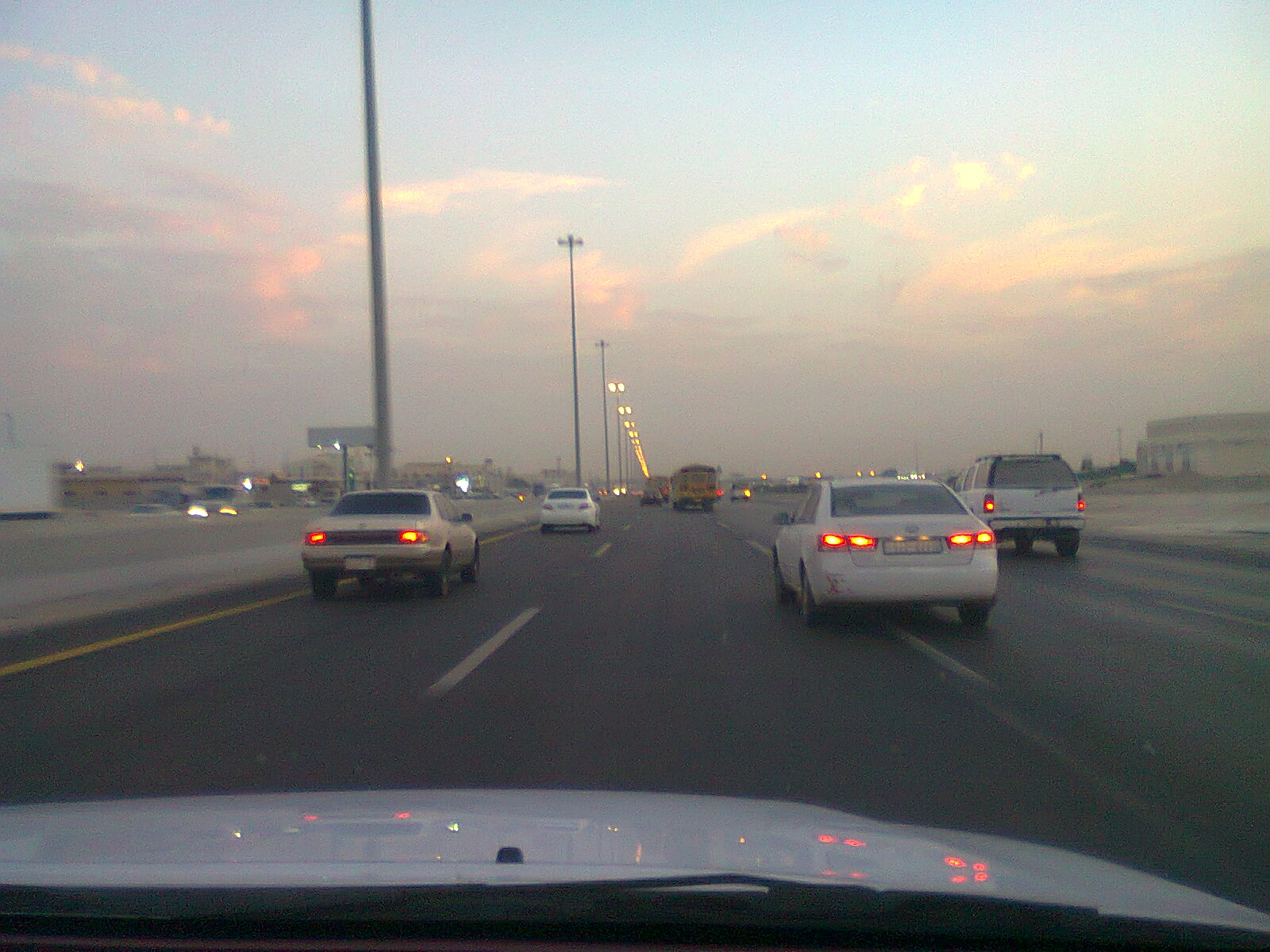
The Ra's Tanura-Jubail section of the highway

At the next intersection, the highway intersects Highway 615, and turns northwest through a modified cloverleaf interchange, which carries it through downtown Dammam. It intersects Highway 605 twice and Highway 617 once before leaving Dammam, passing slightly west of Saihat and 'Anak. An intersection with Road 6384 provides access to the highway to residents of Qatif and Tarout, while another with Highway 614 provides access to Ra's Tanura. 45 km (28 mi) further, it intersects Jubail Expressway 1 and Jubail Expressway 3, branching out to Jubail and the Jubail Industrial City, respectively. Connecting the Jubail Naval Airport, it runs west of the Jubail Marine Conservation, before turning west and back northwest and terminating at Road 7950, which runs west to Highway 95 and east to Ra's al-Khair.

The expressway consists of eight lanes across its entire length, three traffic lanes, with one emergency lane on each side. It is controlled-access with features of some of the more advanced highways of Saudi Arabia such as grade-separated ramps and cloverleaf interchanges. There are only fuel stations and few to no rest areas along the expressway, as it passes through several major cities and suburbs.

== See also ==
- Highway 95 (Saudi Arabia)
- Transport in Saudi Arabia
- Arab Mashreq International Road Network
