= Dammam metropolitan area =

Dammam metropolitan area حاضرة الدمام
- Metropolitan region
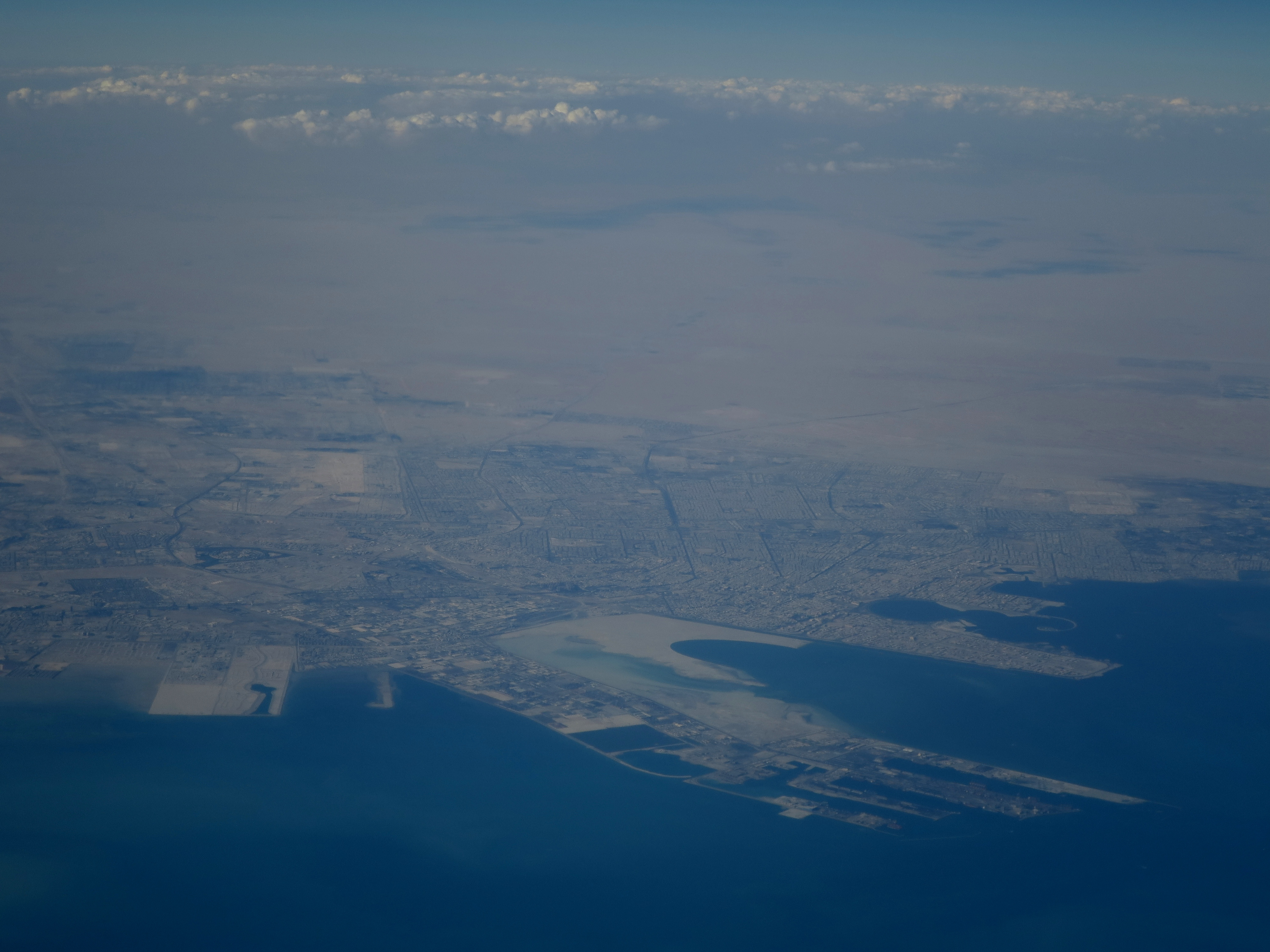
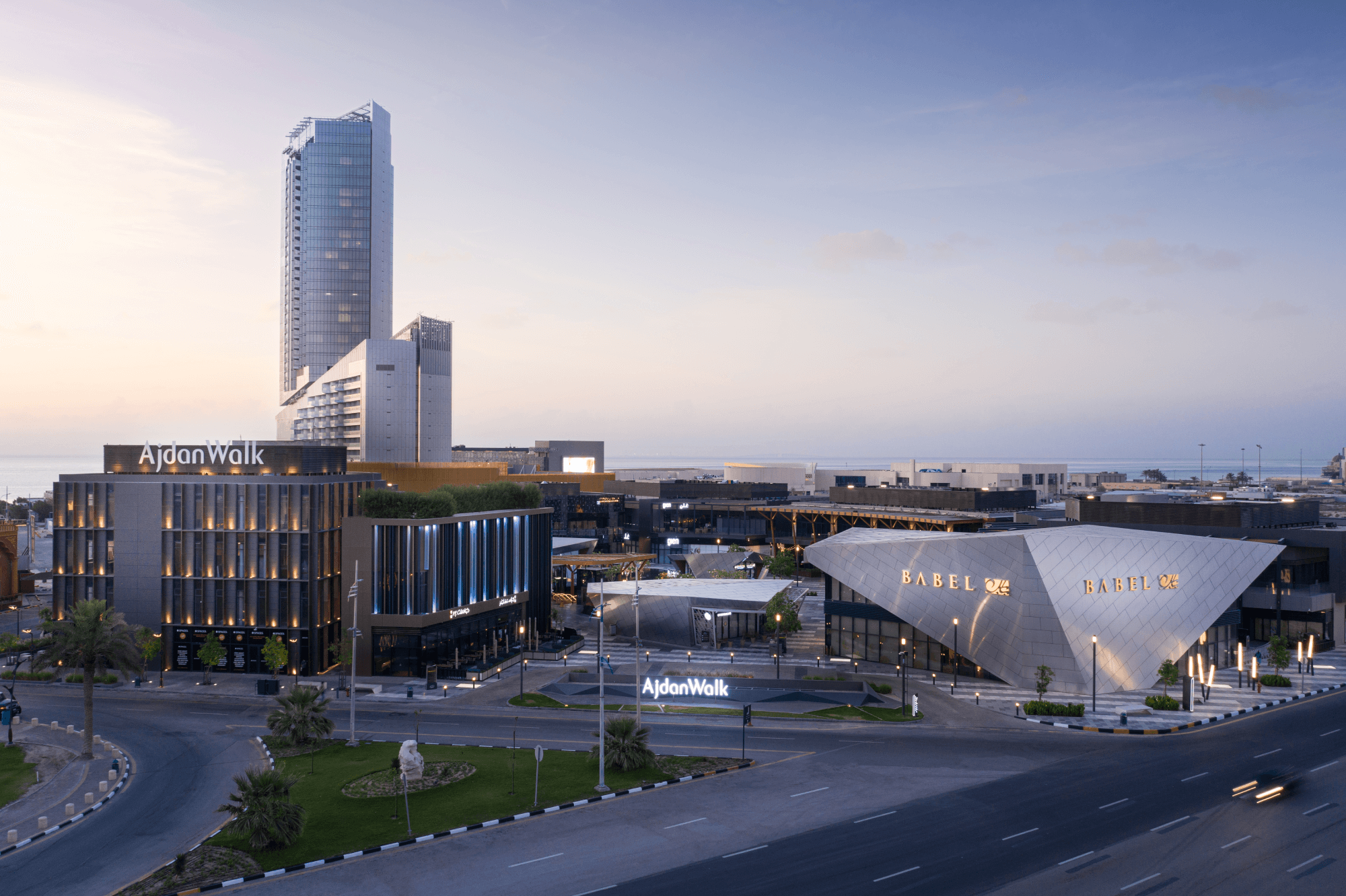
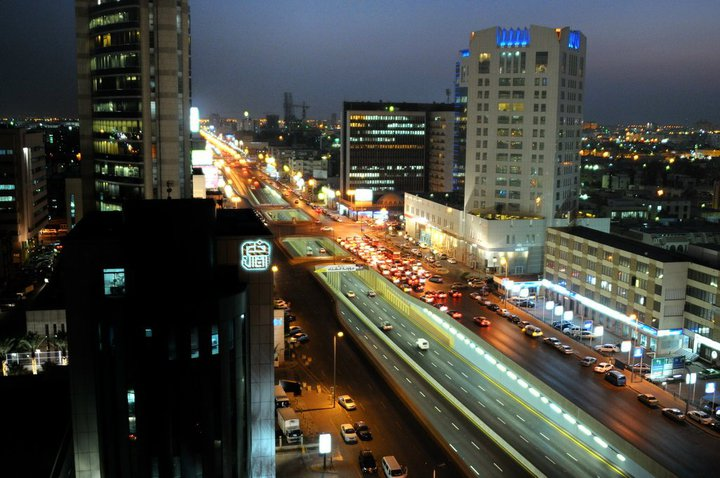
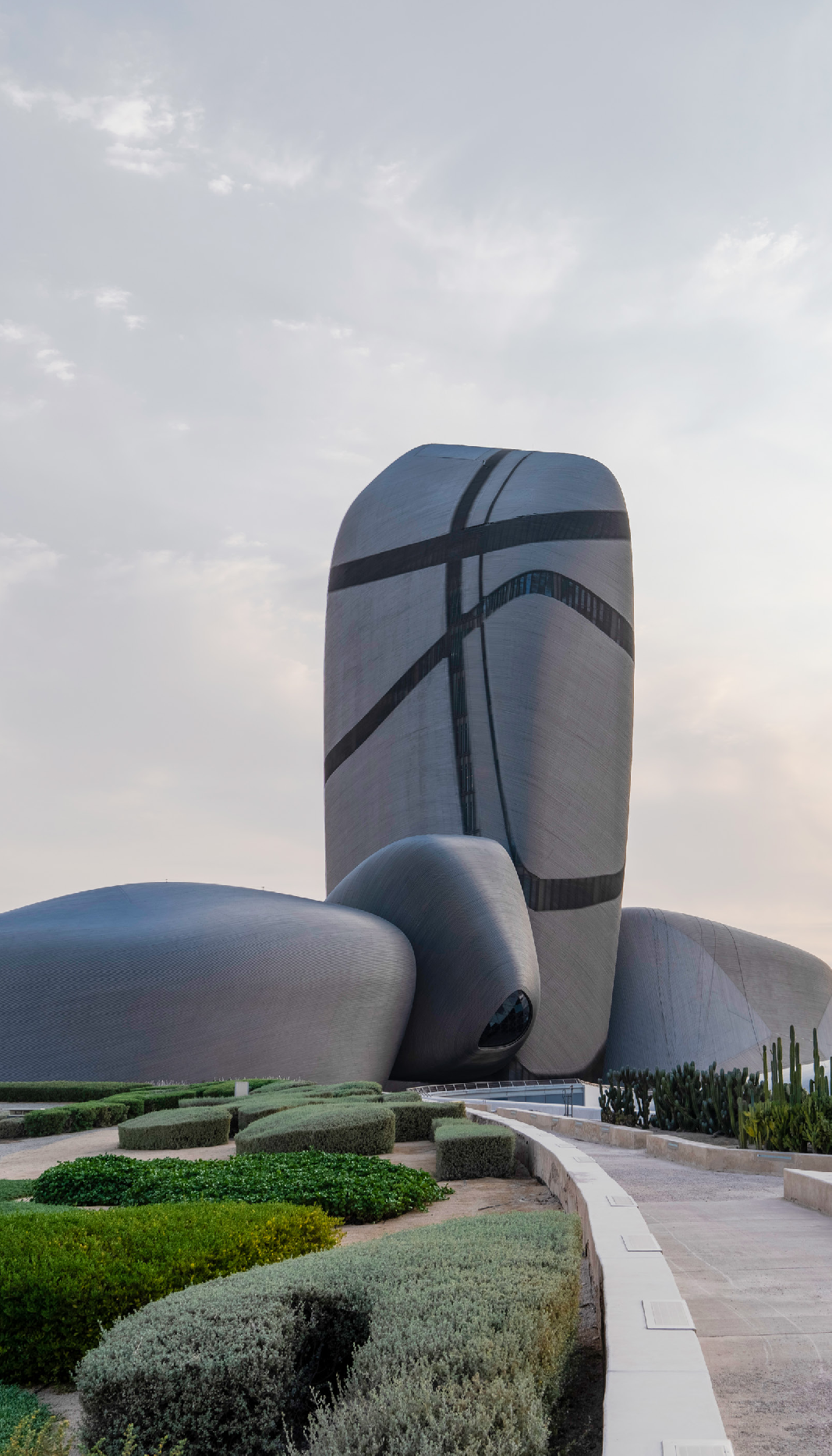
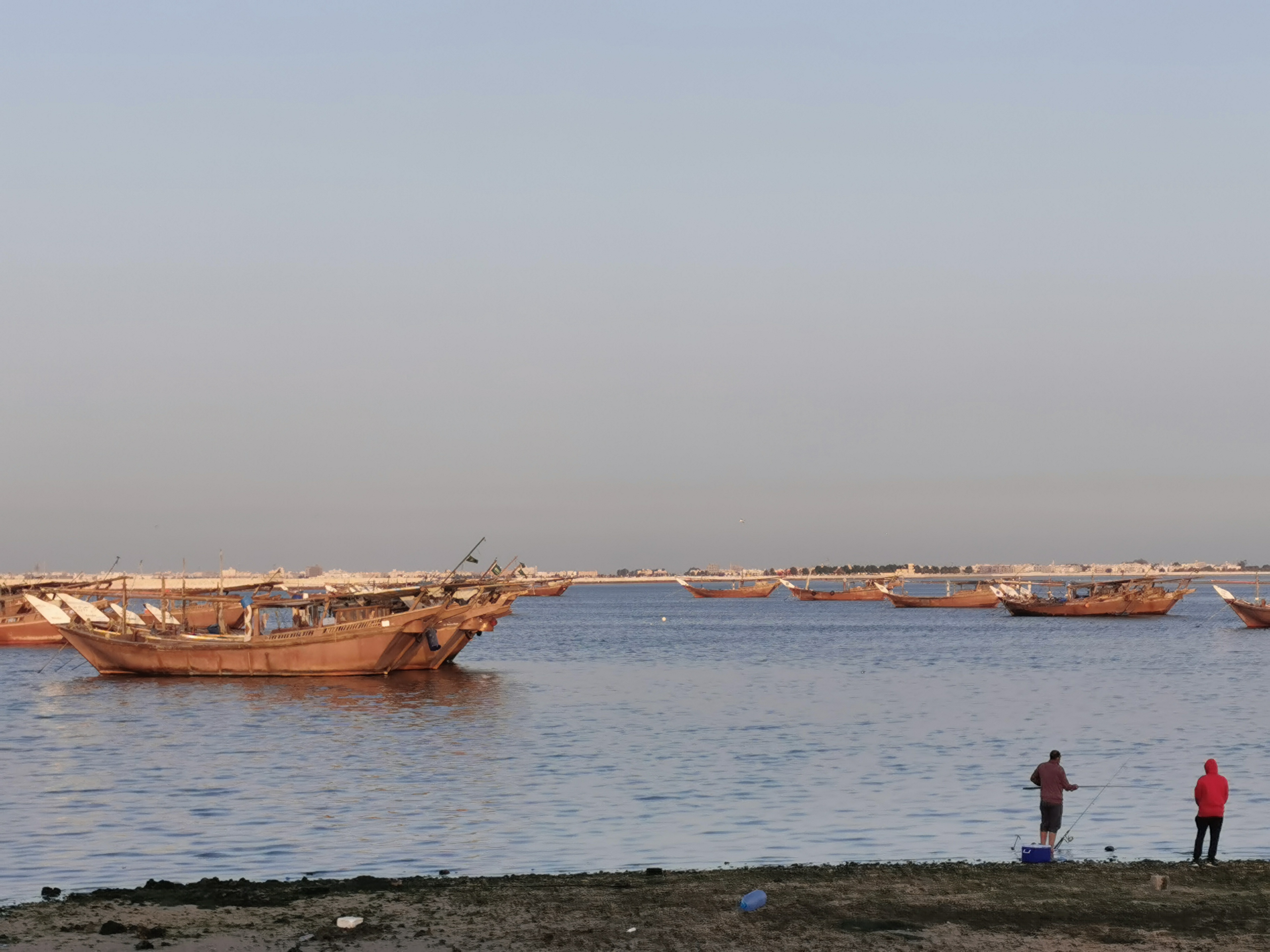
- From top, left to right: Aerial view of Dammam and the King Abdul Aziz Port, the largest port on the Persian Gulf; Ajdan Walk, a large mixed-use commercial project built on the Khobar Seafront; Downtown Khobar with Highway 605; the King Abdulaziz Center for World Culture in Dhahran; Tarout Bay with fishing boats near Qatif
- Country: Saudi Arabia
- Province: Eastern Province
- Core city: Dammam
- Satellite cities: List of satellite cities: Khobar; Dhahran; Qatif; Saihat; Ras Tanura; Tarout; Anak; Safwa

Population (2022)
  - Total: 2,805,632
- Time zone: Saudi Arabia Standard Time (UTC+03:00)
- Area code: 013

The Dammam metropolitan area (Arabic: حاضرة الدمام) or Greater Dammam metropolitan area (Arabic: حاضرة الدمام الكبرى), is the largest metropolitan area in the Eastern Province of Saudi Arabia. It consists of the three governorates comprising the 'Triplet Cities' of Dammam, Khobar, and Dhahran, along with the neighboring governorates of Qatif and Ras Tanura. It had a population of 2,805,632 as of the 2022 census.

The metropolitan area is central to the Saudi economy. Dammam No. 7 (now known as Prosperity Well), the first commercial oil well in Saudi Arabia, was dug in the area and led to the foundation of Saudi Aramco, one of the cornerstones of the global oil industry and one of the world's largest companies, now headquartered in Dhahran. The metropolitan area is also known for its influence in the arts, entertainment, music, and sports industries, along with a longstanding tradition of pearl culturing. The area includes a variety of natural landscapes, parks, and beaches with a recreational coastline to the Persian Gulf.

== History ==
Several tombs, remnants, artifacts and historical references suggest that the area was inhabited more than two thousand years ago. However, most vestiges of human habitation were buried by the encroaching desert sands and the area had been largely deserted for centuries.

Modern history

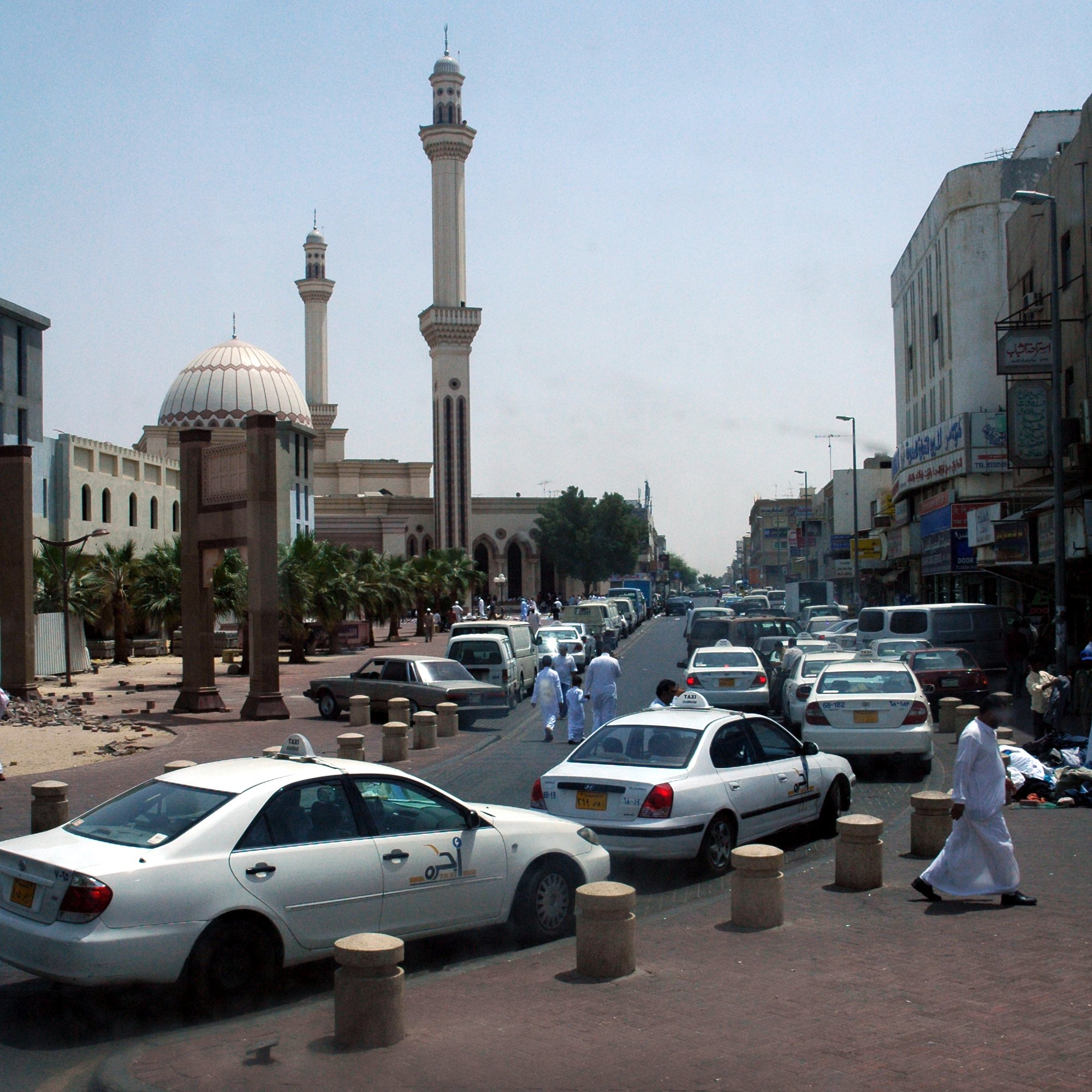
King Fahd Mosque, Dammam

The area was first inhabited by a clan of Al Dossary tribe and a number of the Al Howela families in early 1923. The families led by Sheikh Ahmed ibn Abdullah Al Dossary migrated from Bahrain and were offered to choose land to settle in the area by King Abdul Aziz Ibn Sa'ud Al Sa'ud. Dammam was immediately chosen for its vicinity to the island of Bahrain as the clan hoped to head back there soon, but the British rule in the region made it very hard for them to move so they finally settled in Dammam. Years later, Sheikh Ahmed's brother and his family moved south to Al Khobar, which by that time was already inhabited. The arrival of the Sheikh Ahmed's brother resulted in a population boost for Khobar and closer ties with the bigger city of Dammam. When the modern Kingdom of Saudi Arabia was founded in 1932, the area was the site of several small settlements that depended on fishing and pearls for their survival.

The area's transformation was launched with the discovery of oil in commercial quantities. The Dammam No. 7 well proved beyond doubt that the Kingdom possessed a large supply of hydrocarbons. Over the span of a little more than half a century, the area has developed into a thriving hub of industry, commerce and science, and home to around two million people. New oil fields discovered during the 1940s and 1950s, now account for a quarter of the world's proven oil reserves. Experts and technicians from the Kingdom and from around the world gathered to help search for new oil fields and bring them on-stream.

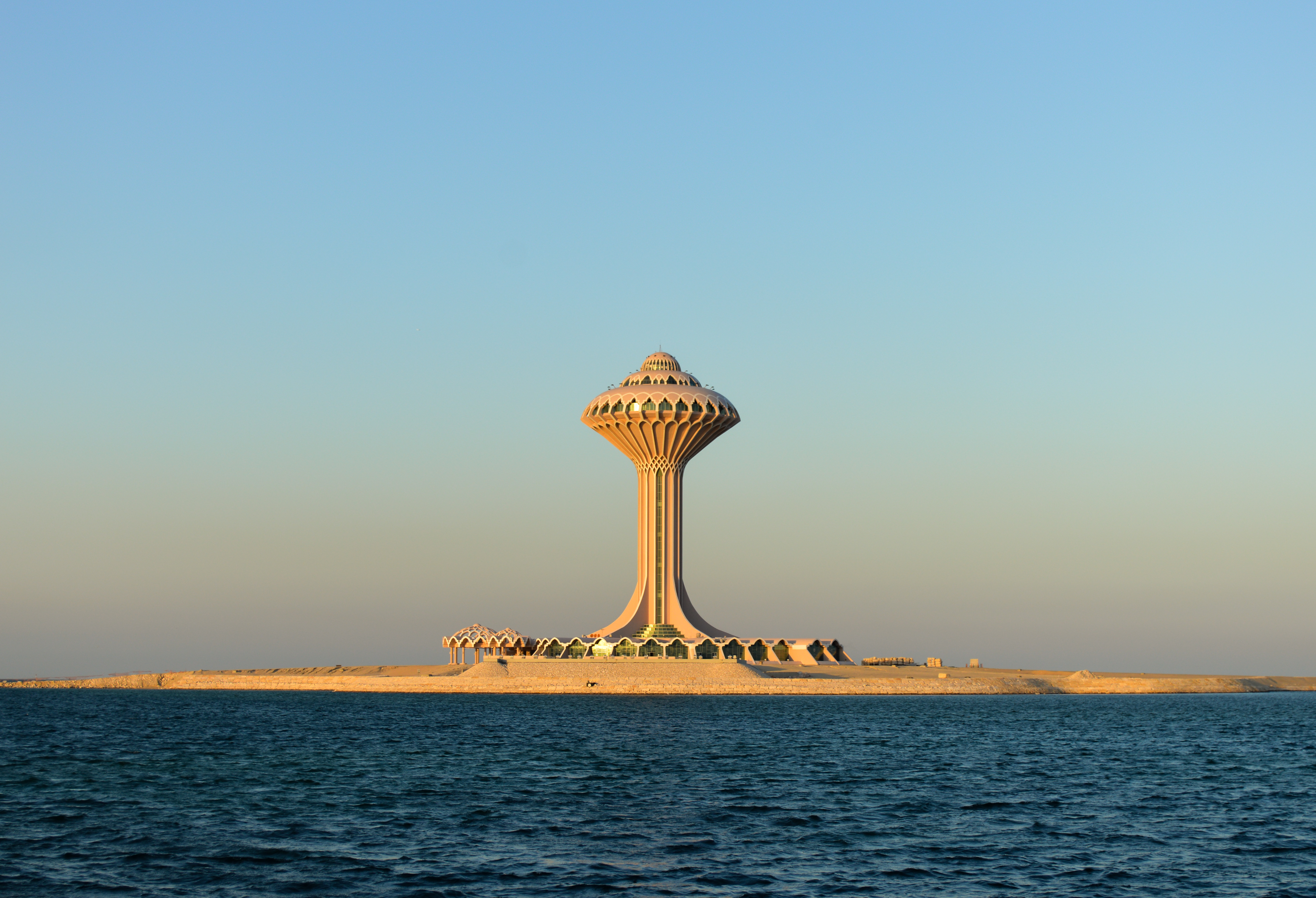
The Khobar Water Tower where many spectators gather to witness dramatic fireworks shows at special occasions such as the 'Eid al-Fitr and 'Eid al-Adha.

The growing number of expatriates working in Dhahran required the building of housing, hospitals, schools for their children and other amenities. Before long, Dhahran, the corporate headquarters of Saudi Aramco, was growing in all directions. The growth of the oil industry in the region had a similar impact on the small fishing villages of Dammam and Khobar. Within two decades of the discovery of oil, the huts of the fishermen that crowded the shore, which constituted the only permanent dwellings in the area, had given way to concrete buildings and modern housing, highways and streets.

Located on the Persian Gulf coast east of Dhahran, Khobar briefly became the shipping point for Saudi Arabian crude oil to the refinery in Bahrain. In the years leading up to and during World War II, Saudi Arabian oil production was very limited, and since the company had no refinery of its own, most of the oil was sent by small tankers to Bahrain. With the construction of a pipeline to Bahrain and the subsequent expansion of the oil industry in the post-war years, the focus of the shipping and oil industries shifted from Khobar to Dammam and Ra's Tanura, one of the largest oil storage and shipping centers in the world, located 25 km north of Dammam. As a result, Khobar gradually found a new role as the commercial center for the entire region.

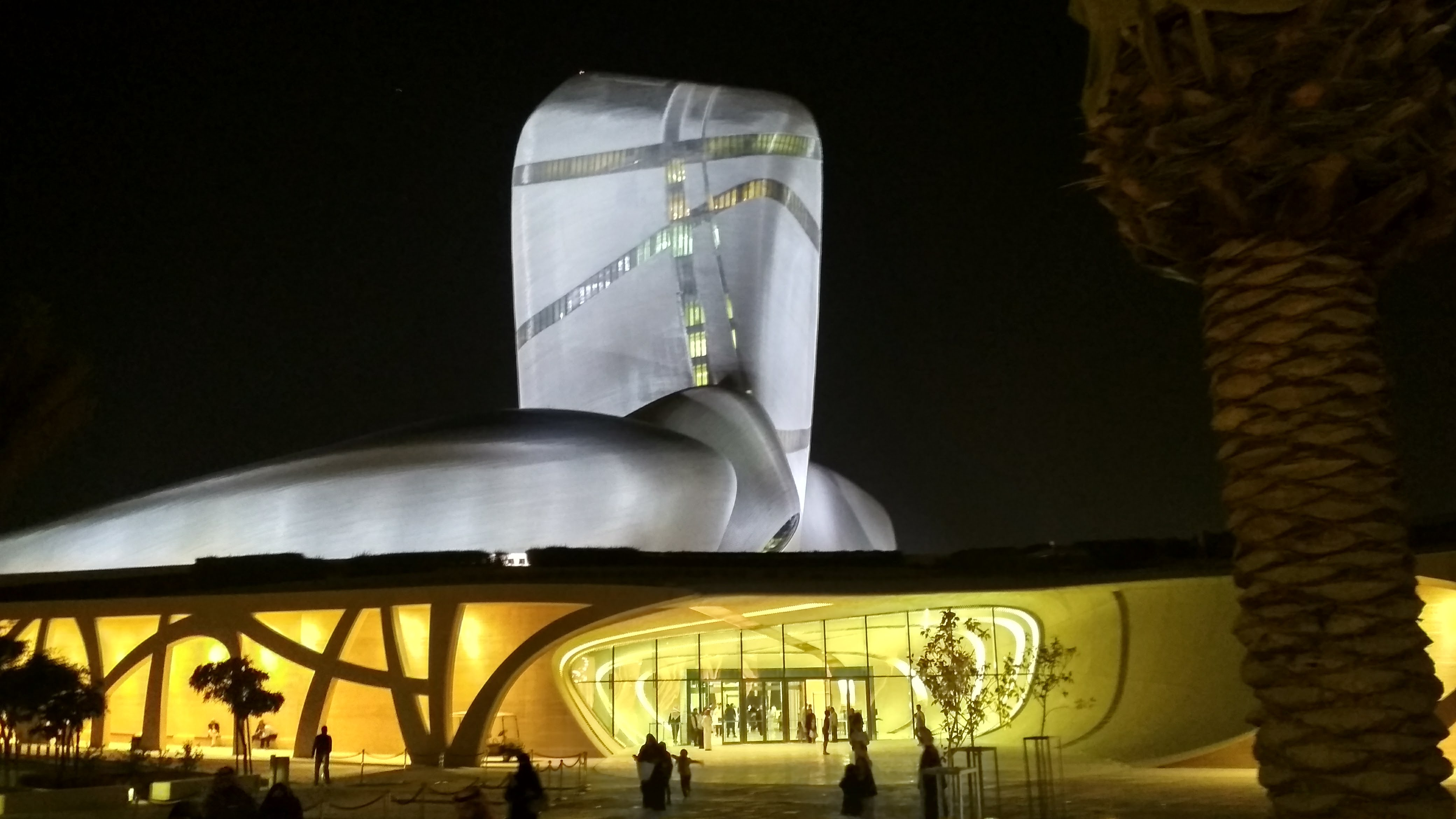
The King Abdul Aziz Center for World Culture was built as a tourist attraction near the headquarters of Saudi Aramco in Dhahran.

In the early 1980s, Dammam, the capital of the Eastern Province, was a separate city but so close to Khobar and Dhahran that one could pass from one to the other in a few minutes. The discovery of oil in Dhahran and nearby fields and the growing importance of the entire region affected Dammam more than any other city in Saudi Arabia. Within three decades, the fishing village, now a city, had become the capital of the largest province of Saudi Arabia. The simultaneous growth of the "Triplet Cities" brought the three jurisdictions into physical contact, the three towns inevitably merged into one, creating a single municipality known as the Dammam metropolitan area, referred to simply as Dammam or Greater Dammam. Each of the three towns still retains its own character and some local administrative functions but, in terms of their place in the Kingdom, Dammam forms a single administrative entity.

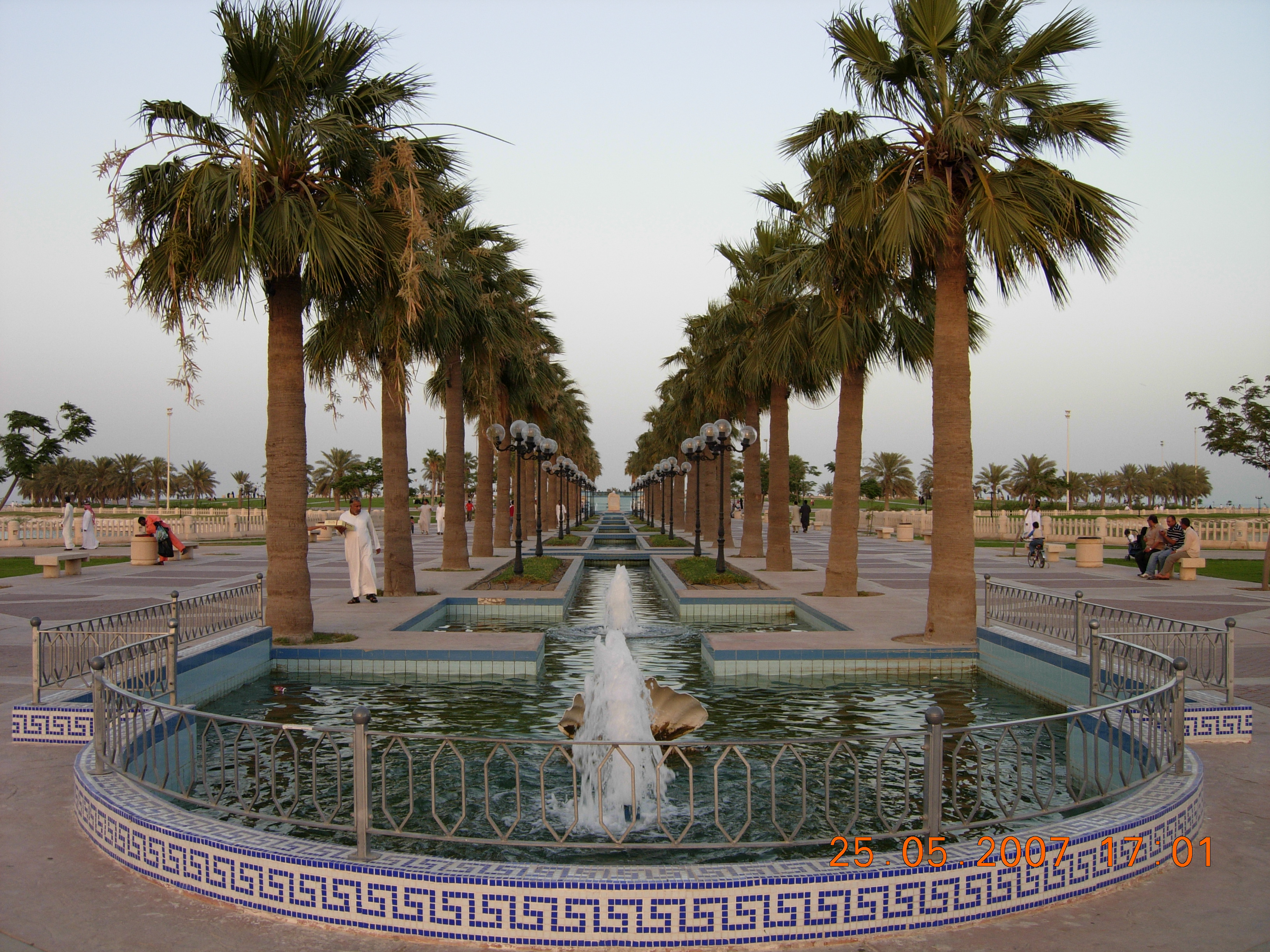
The park at Corniche in Khobar

The growth of the Saudi Arabian oil industry brought about rapid development in the region. As oil production increased, so did the number of people required to run the industry. The growing population needed more housing and services. First-rate hospitals and schools were built, service industries sprouted up to support the oil industry and meet the needs of people living in the area. As a result, a region which had several hundred inhabitants some sixty years ago now boasts a population of well over 1.5 million, growing at a pace of over five percent a year. The area did not just develop a booming oil industry, it developed in all spheres. It is now a modern urban and industrial center. As oil production was growing in the early years, the Saudi Arabian government took steps to facilitate the evolution of Greater Dammam. New roads and highways connected the area to other urban and industrial centers in the Kingdom. A railway line was built to connect the area to the capital, Riyadh. The Dhahran International Airport was established between Dhahran and Khobar to connect the region to other parts of the Kingdom and beyond.

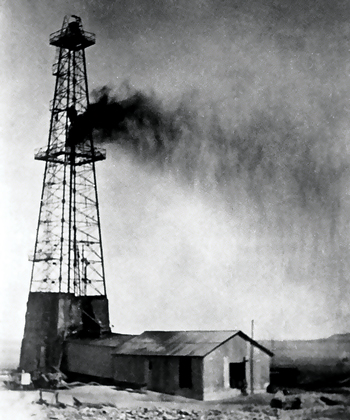
The Dammam No. 7 well on March 4, 1938. In many ways, this was the spark needed to light the fire of development in the region.

To encourage the growth of non-oil industries, an industrial city, the 1st Industrial City of Dammam, was established in the open space between the three cities. This industrial complex was swiftly engulfed by the urban mass. As a result, the 2nd Industrial City of Dammam was established further away from the metropolitan area along the highway to Abqaiq and Hofuf. Together, these two industrial cities house more than 300 factories which manufacture a variety of consumer and industrial products that are marketed throughout the Kingdom and exported to other countries around the world. Handling such exports as well as imports from abroad, is the domain of shipping agents and commercial companies located in Dammam and Khobar, making the area not only a major oil producing and exporting area, but also a commercial and shipping center. The swift growth of the region necessitated the construction of a larger and more modern airport to replace the Dhahran International Airport. The new King Fahd International Airport serves not just the Dammam metropolitan area, but the entire Eastern Province.

Having been built from the ground up, the area was designed from the outset on the principles of modern urban planning. Residential areas are separate from commercial sections, roads are broad and straight and buildings conform to a master plan. One of the main features of the development of the area is land reclamation. Vast stretches of the shallow Persian Gulf have been filled, with hotels and office buildings occupying what were once marshes. Water for household, urban and industrial use is provided by desalination plants that supply approximately seven million cubic feet of treated water to the area each day. The availability of water underpins the urban and industrial growth of the area and provisions have been made for expanding existing desalination facilities to meet future growth.

In many ways, the Dammam metropolitan area has evolved as the link between Saudi Arabia and the outside world, exporting the Kingdom's products and importing its needs and thriving on the interaction between Saudi Arabia and other countries.

== Transportation ==
=== Major highways ===
The following highways serve the region:

- Highway 40
- Highway 95
- Highway 605
- Highway 613
- Highway 610
- Highway 615
- Highway 617
- King Fahd Causeway – connecting Khobar to the neighboring island nation of Bahrain.

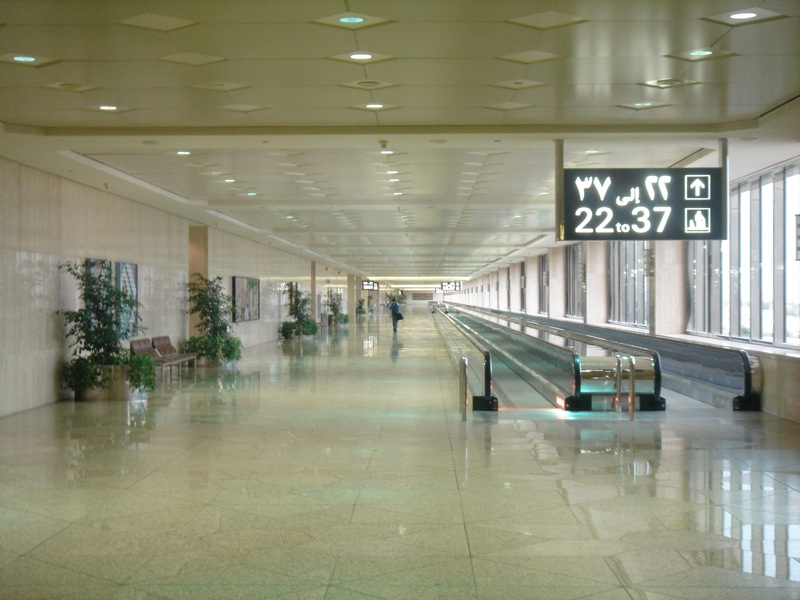
Interior of the terminal at King Fahd International Airport

=== Air transport ===
King Fahd International Airport serves the region and is located about 20 km northwest of Dammam along Highway 605. The airport serves an estimated 9.8 million people annually (2017) and is the largest airport in the world by land area (~780 km^{2}).

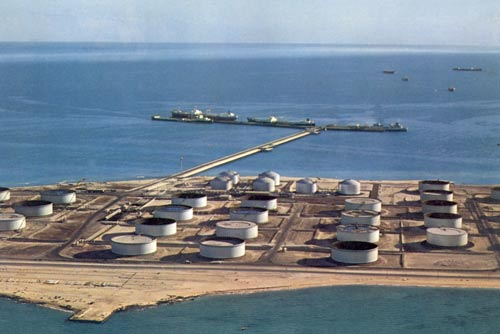
Saudi Aramco facilities near the Port of Ras Tanura

=== Sea transport ===
The King Abdul Aziz Port is the largest on the Persian Gulf, and its import-export traffic is the second-highest in Saudi Arabia, after the Jeddah Islamic Port on the Red Sea. It is one of the most important ports in the country and is under the supervision of the Saudi Ports Authority. In addition, the Port of Ras Tanura, located near Ras Tanura is managed by Saudi Aramco.

=== Rail transport ===
The area is connected to the national capital, Riyadh, via the Dammam–Riyadh line, which also provides passenger connections to Abqaiq and Hofuf, and an additional freight connection to Haradh.
