= Tarout Bay =

Bay of the Persian Gulf in Saudi Arabia

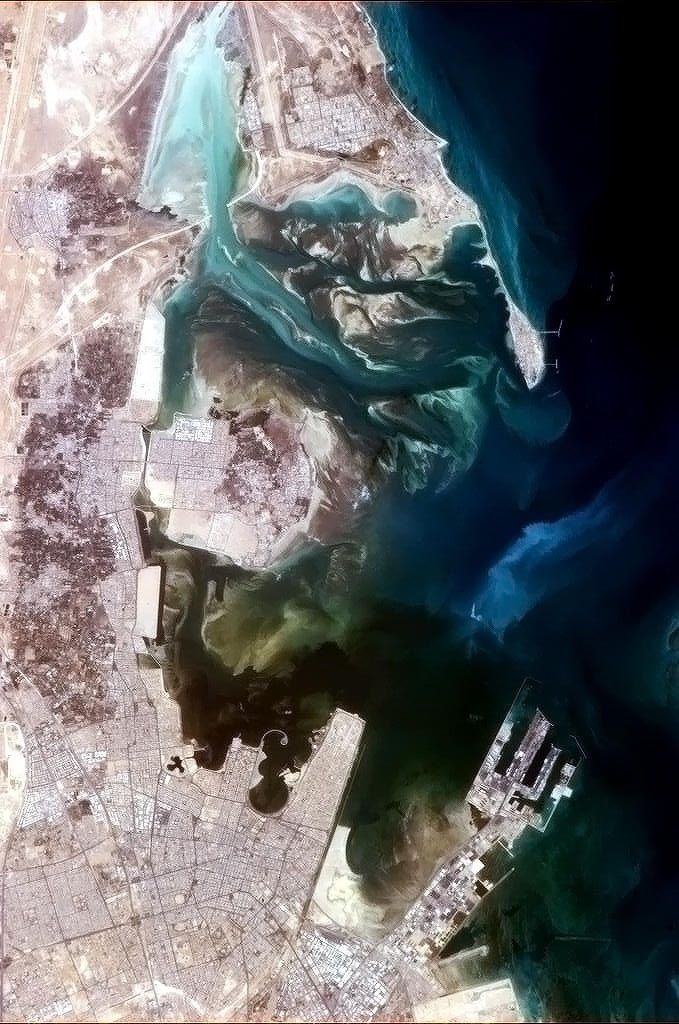
- Interactive map of Tarout Bay
- Location: Saudi Arabia
- Coordinates: 26°37′41″N 50°05′35″E

Tarout Bay (Arabic: خليج تاروت) is a body of water located west of the Persian Gulf. It is bordered to the west by Tarout Island and Qatif, to the north by Ras Tanura and Safwa, and to the south by Dammam and Saihat. Tarout Bay is characterized by its shallow depth and the presence of sandy and muddy areas. The location of the cities of Qatif and Dammam on the western and southern sides of the bay helps to block winds and air currents. Tarout Bay contains three islands: Halat Za'al, Tarout and Darin. These islands are notable for their exposed sandy shores, sandy and muddy plains, and the proliferation of mangrove trees, seagrass, and salt flats. The bay's waters are also home to shrimp and fish, which attract birds to the area.

== Geography ==
Tarout Bay borders numerous cities and villages, whose lives have been intertwined with the bay, from Safwa, Al-Awamiya, Qatif, Anak, and Saihat to Dammam.

== Wildlife ==
BirdLife International has described Tarout Bay as an important site for wintering and migrating waders and other waterbirds. In addition to the prevalence of sea snakes and green turtles in the region, two endangered bird species, both rare winter visitors, have been recorded: the African fish eagle and the white-tailed eagle. Another significant raptor is the spotted eagle, although its numbers have dwindled from 20 in 1983 to only six, likely due to the removal of mangrove trees along the coast of Tarout Island.

== See also ==
- List of islands of Saudi Arabia
