= Highway 40 (Saudi Arabia) =

Highway in Saudi Arabia

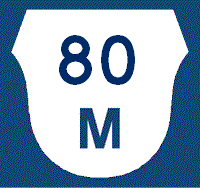
Highway 40
- Map
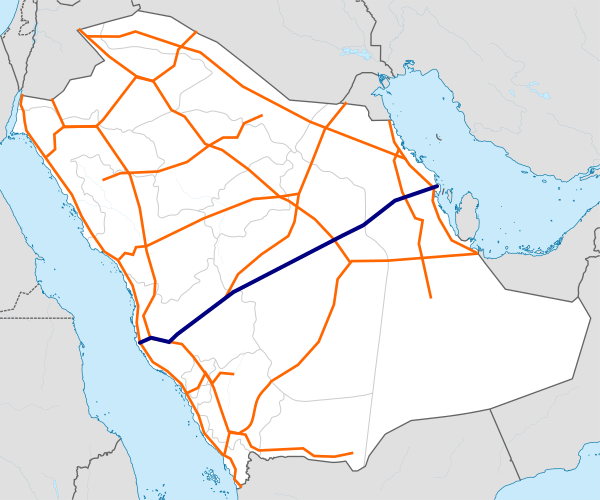

Route information
- Length: 1,395 km (867 mi)
- Existed: 1965–present
- Time period: 1961–present (east of Riyadh) 1965–present

Major junctions
- West end: Highway 5 in Jeddah
- East end: Highway 613 near Dammam

Location
- Country: Saudi Arabia
- Provinces: Mecca; Riyadh; Eastern
- Major cities: Jeddah; Mecca; Ta'if; Riyadh; Dammam

Highway system
- Transport in Saudi Arabia

Highway 40 (Arabic: الطريق السريع ٤٠) is a major east–west six-lane controlled-access highway in Saudi Arabia, spanning 1,395 km (867 mi). It connects Jeddah, the second-largest city in the kingdom, on the western coast, to Dammam on the eastern coast, the fifth-largest city and the largest in the Eastern Province. The highway runs through or near Mecca, Ta'if, Riyadh, Abqaiq and Khobar along its length, and provides access to the Mahazat as-Sayd and Saja and Umm Al Ramth wildlife sanctuaries.

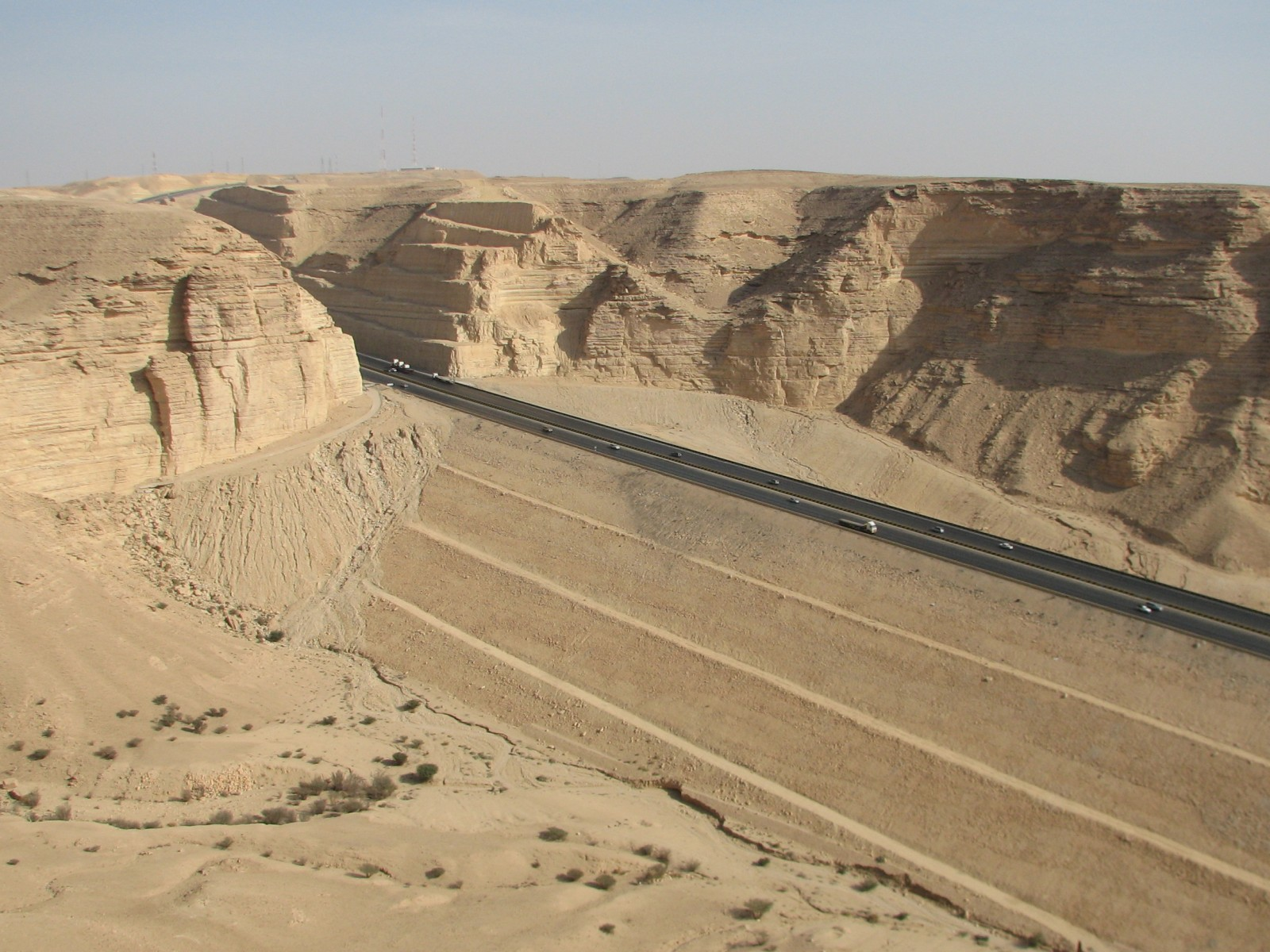
Highway 40 passing through the Tuwaiq escarpment, west of Riyadh

The highway consists of three traffic lanes and an emergency lane on each side (a total of six traffic lanes and eight total lanes) separated by a median strip. All intersections of the highway are grade separated. The route traverses the mostly flat Najd plateau, and thus requires no bridges or tunnels for most of its length. Near the western part, the highway twists and turns around the Hejaz mountains, before reaching the western coastal plain. Several connector roads and highways connect the highway to other major roads and highways along its length.

In 1953, the need to connect the capital, Riyadh, to the oil-rich economically prosperous regions in the east and the Islamic holy sites to the west arose. The project to build the section of the highway connecting Dammam and Riyadh began construction and was completed earlier than the western section, in 1961. This new road also connected Riyadh to the major agricultural areas in the oasis of al-Ahsa. In 1965, the western section of the highway connecting Riyadh and the Islamic holy sites in the west was completed as the primary east–west axis of the kingdom.

In conjunction with the Kingdom's five-year plans, the Saudi Ministry of Transport prepared its own comprehensive plan, known as the Five-Year Road Programme. The first of these began in 1970 and the system is still implemented today. During the Third Development Plan (1980–85), the Riyadh–Dammam section of the modern-day highway was modernized and measured 375 km (233 mi). Finally, during the Fourth Development Plan (1985–90), the Riyadh–Jeddah section of the highway was modernized and in 1986, the highway was commissioned as Highway 40 in the new, standardised Saudi road network.

== Route description ==
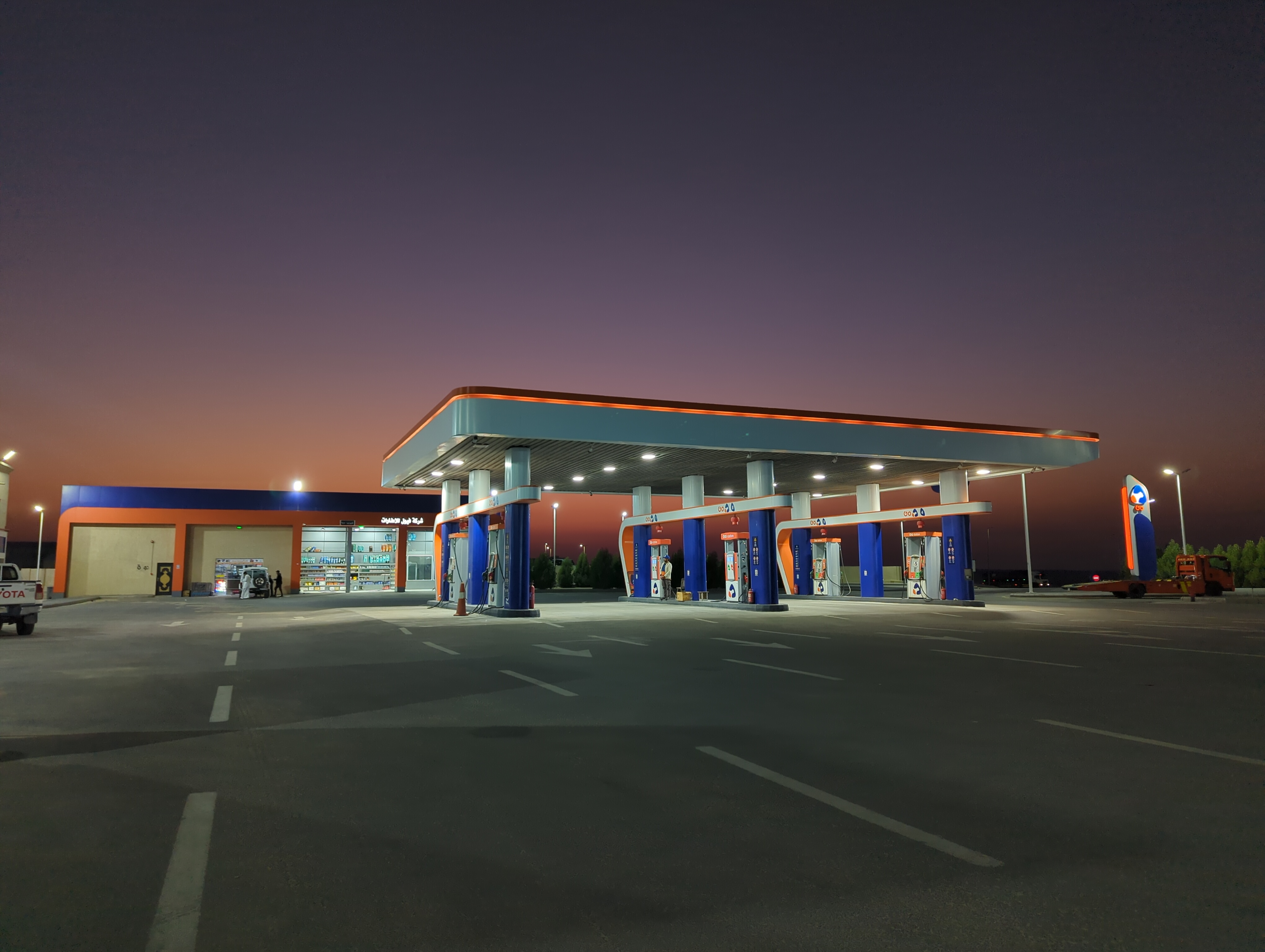
Gas Station at Highway 40 during sunset

Highway 40 (Arabic: الطريق السريع ٤٠) is a major east–west six-lane controlled-access highway in Saudi Arabia, connecting Jeddah, the second-largest city in the kingdom, to the economically prosperous and oil-rich Eastern Province, making it the kingdom's only coast-to-coast highway. The highway runs in a northeast–southwest direction, traversing the width of the entire Arabian Peninsula. Being part of the Saudi road network, Highway 40 carries the Arab Mashreq Route 80M (Jeddah–Mecca–Riyadh–Dammam–Manama). The highway spans 1,395 km (867 mi) between Jeddah (at the interchange with Highway 5 near Prince Abdullah Al Faisal Stadium) and Dammam at the interchange with Highway 613; via Riyadh. The route serves Mecca via the Umm al-Qura' Road, Ta'if via Highway 287 and Highway 267, Riyadh via Highway 522, Hofuf via Highway 75, Buqayq via Highway 607, and Khobar and Dhahran via Highway 95.

It exhibits eight lanes across its entire length, three traffic lanes, with one emergency lane on each side. Highway 40 is a controlled-access highway with grade-separated ramps and like most of the other major highways in Saudi Arabia, almost all of the interchanges on the highway are cloverleaf interchanges, with the exception of U-turn interchanges, which are a variant of the grade-separated U-turn interchange. There are numerous rest areas along the highway, with some having the most basic of amenities such as just a petrol station and cafe, with others including restaurants, hotels, fast-food franchises, and almost all of them have a mosque, with regulations stating that there should be a travel time of no longer than 60 minutes between rest areas.

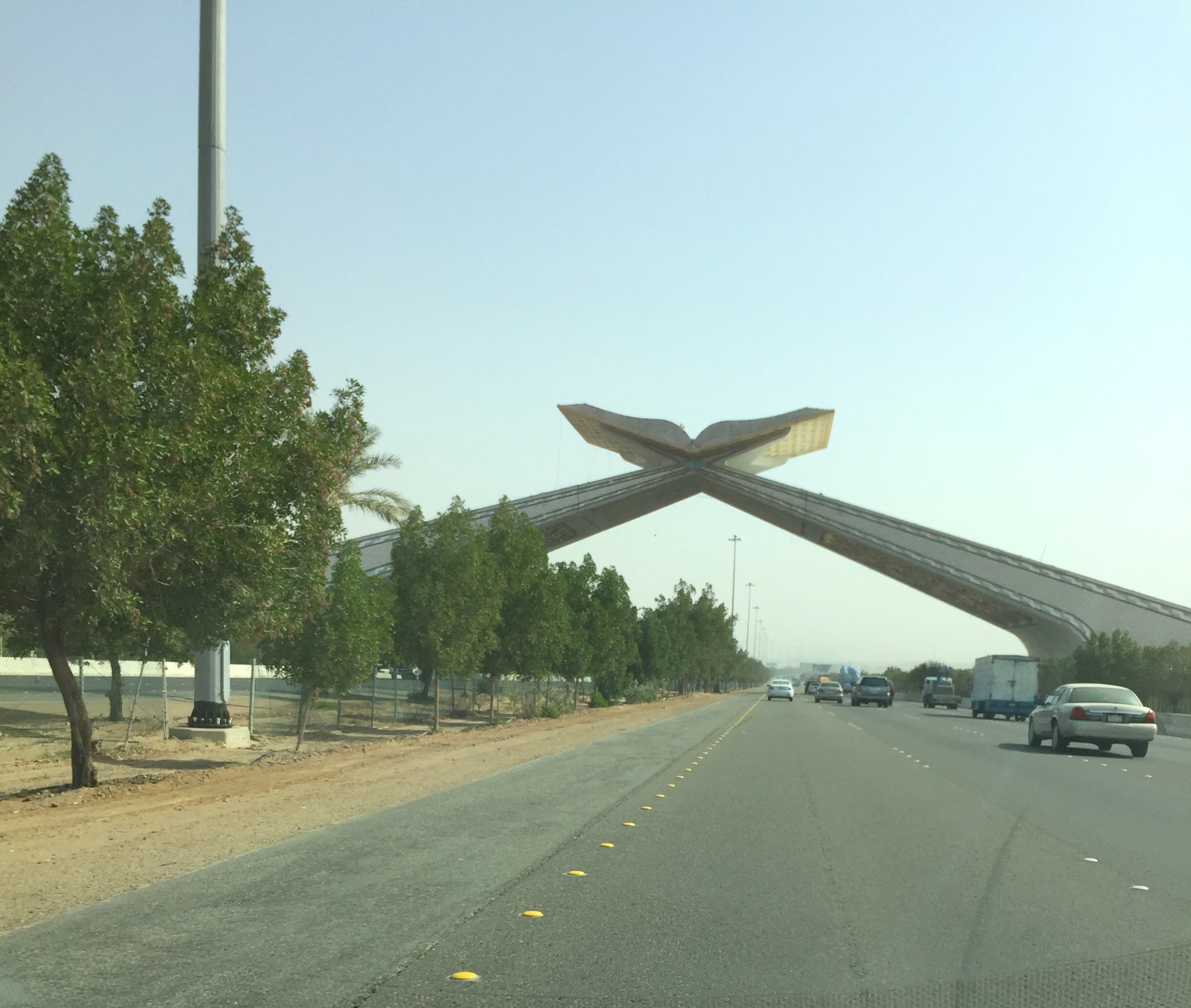
The Gate of Mecca (Arabic: بوابة مكة | Bawabat Makkah), under which Highway 40 passes, west of Mecca.

The highway begins at the intersection with Highway 5 near Prince Abdullah Al Faisal Stadium in south Jeddah in the Al Waziriyah district of Jeddah. It leaves eastward, winding through the Hejaz mountains before reaching the haram boundary of Mecca. Between the two boundaries of the haram surrounding Mecca, Highway 40 turns northward and then back east along the northern perimeter of the holy city and even through the Jannat al-Mu'alla cemetery before turning back northeast toward Riyadh and exiting Mecca passing just south of Jabal al-Nur. Highway 40 then continues north-east and intersects Highway 50 at Dhalim. Highway 40 passes through some of Riyadh's most famous intersections, known as 'squares,' even though these are purely dedicated to road transport. The most famous of these are Doha Square (Exit 1) and Rabat Square (Exit 4). The highway then continues north east after exiting Riyadh and reaches Greater Dammam, intersecting Highway 95, which carries 80M southward, before terminating at the intersection with Highway 613.

All roads in Saudi Arabia are operated by the Saudi Ministry of Transport. For speed limit enforcement, most of the western portion of the highway uses radar, while the eastern and central parts use traditional cameras. Fog-prone areas, especially in the eastern parts, are marked with huge signs with light warnings and the speed limit is reduced to 15 kilometres per hour (9.3 mph) in the case of fog. In February 2018, it was announced that the speed limit on key highways in the Saudi road network was being raised to 140 kilometres per hour (87 mph) from the previous 120 kilometres per hour (75 mph) for private vehicles, and Highway 40 was included in these.

== History ==
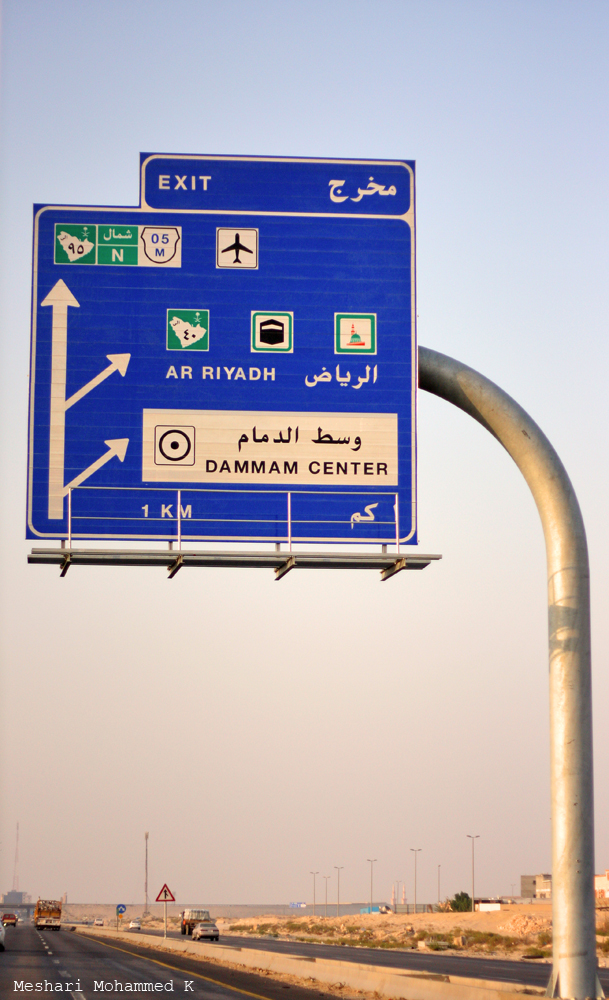
A sign on Highway 95 leading to the exit to Highway 40, with Mecca being denoted by the Kaaba and Medina denoted by the Green Dome

In 1952, the Dammam-Riyadh railway line finished construction under Saudi Aramco, connecting the capital of the country to the oil-rich regions in the Eastern Province and to the headquarters of Saudi Aramco. With the arrival of petrodollars, the rise of the Saudi middle class and an increase in private vehicle ownership, the need to connect the Saudi capital to the Eastern Province and to the Islamic holy sites in the west by road arose in 1953 and the Ministry of Transport was founded the same year. The Riyadh–Dammam section of the highway was completed first in 1961, owing to Dammam's closer distance to Riyadh as well as the attraction of economic prosperity from the oil-rich regions in the east. With the completion of the eastern portion, the Saudi government now shifted focus to the west and the Riyadh–Jeddah section was completed in 1965.

In 1969, the Ministry of Transport introduced the Five-Year Road Programme, in conjunction with the pre-existing five-year plans the Saudi government used. The first of these began in 1970, and the system is still used today. During the Third Development Plan (1980–85), the Riyadh–Dammam section of the highway, measuring 375 km (233 mi) was modernized to its present-day configuration and during the Fourth Development Plan (1985–90), the Jeddah–Riyadh section completed its modernization. With the highway completely upgraded, the Saudi Ministry of Transport finally commissioned the highway, signing it Highway 40, in 1986.

Since 1986, the highway has seen no change except for the addition of speed limit enforcement systems, with the sections west of the intersection with Highway 50 using radar and the sections east of it using a combination of traditional speed traps and radar. In February 2018, the speed limit on Highway 40, along with other major highways in the kingdom, was increased from 120 kilometres per hour (75 mph) to 140 kilometres per hour (87 mph) for private vehicles.

== See also ==
- Highway 95 (Saudi Arabia)
- Highway 65 (Saudi Arabia)
- Highway 613 (Saudi Arabia)
- Transport in Saudi Arabia
- Ministry of Transport (Saudi Arabia)
