= 2015 Saihat shooting =

Terrorist attack

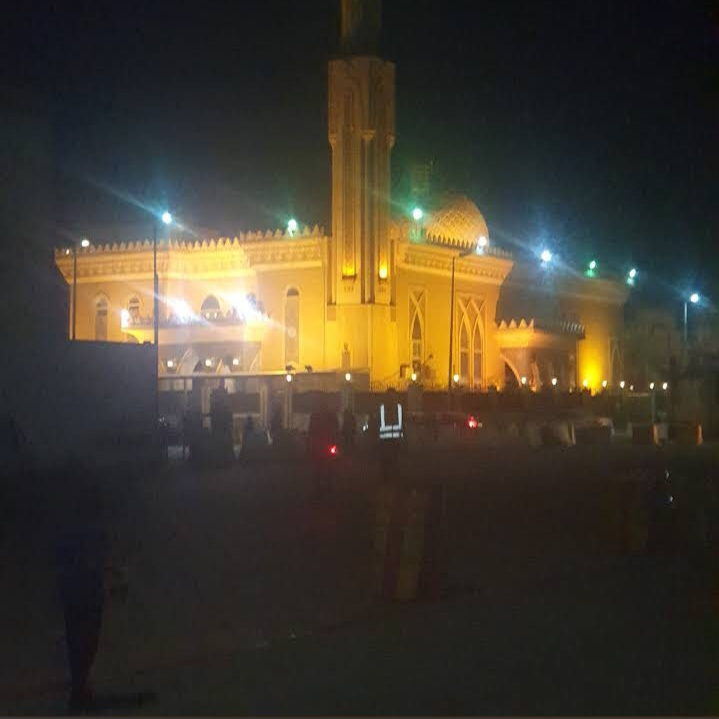
- Location: Saihat, Qatif, Saudi Arabia
- Date: 16 October 2015
- Target: Shia Muslims
- Weapon: Kalashnikov rifle
- Deaths: 6 (including the attacker)
- Injuries: 9
- Perpetrator: ISIS
- Motive: Anti-Shi'ism

The 2015 Saihat shooting was a terrorist attack by the Islamic State in the city of Saihat, Qatif, in the Eastern Province of Saudi Arabia. A resident claimed that the assailant approached a Hussainiya in a taxi, but was stopped at a checkpoint manned by volunteers protecting the site. The suspect started shooting randomly inside the building, before the police intervened and killed the suspect.

== Attack ==
A resident stated that the assailant approached the Hussainiya in a taxi but was stopped at a checkpoint manned by volunteers protecting the site. A ministry interior spokesmen stated that at about 7 pm a suspect with an automatic weapon "started to shoot randomly" at a Shiite Hussainiya l used for commemorations in Saihat. As a result of his shooting, five citizens (four men and one woman) were killed. Nine others were wounded. The militant was later shot dead by the police.

== Responsibility ==
The Islamic State claimed the attack in a statement, claiming that the militant was named "Shuja al-Dawsari". They stated, “With the approval of God Almighty, the soldier of the caliphate Shuja al-Dawsari, may God accept him, set his Kalashnikov upon one of the apostate polytheists’ temples”.
