= Dammam =

Capital of Eastern Province, Saudi Arabia

Dammam الدمام
- Capital city
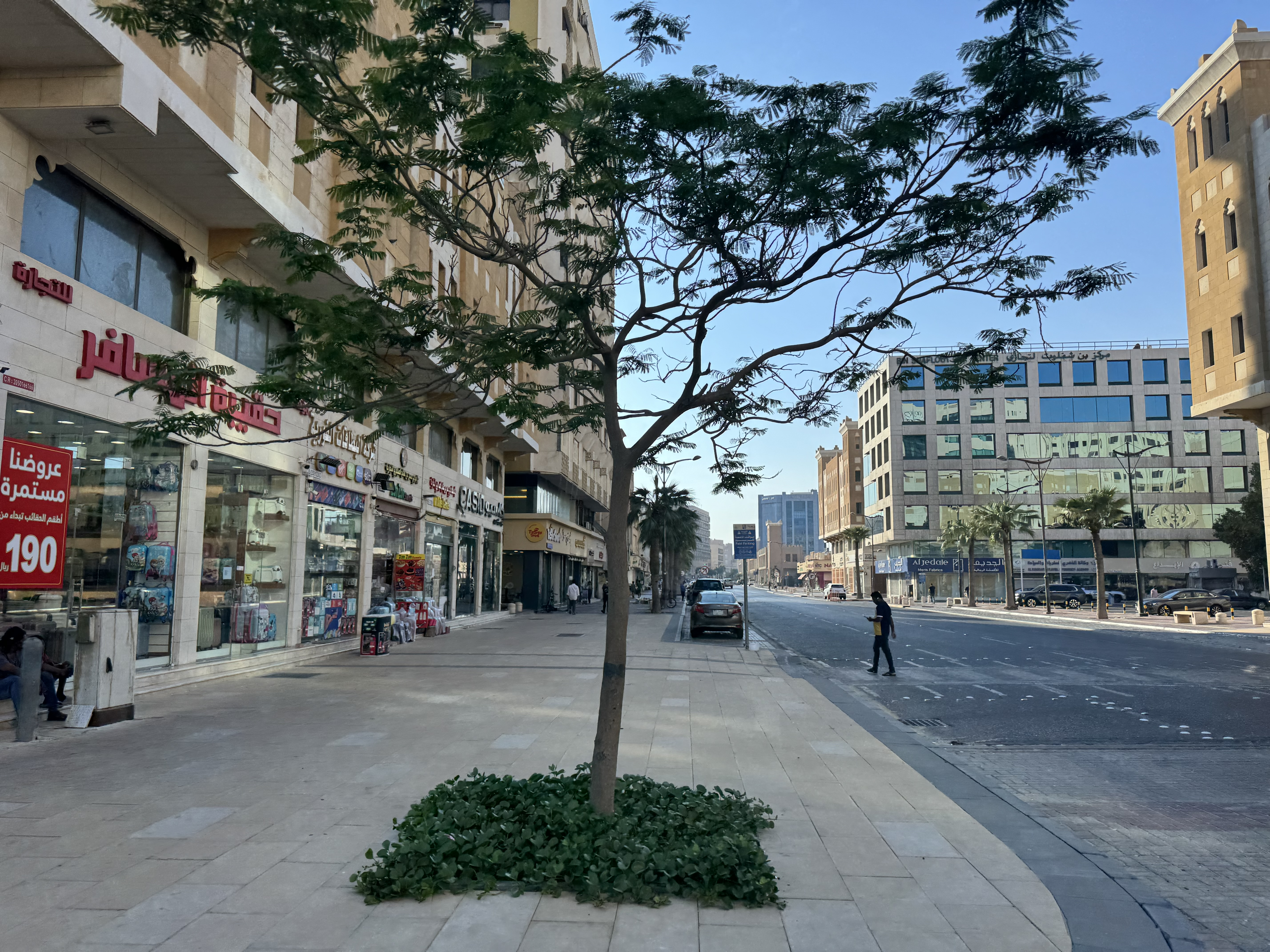
- Dammam downtown in 2024

- Seal

- Location of Dammam within Saudi Arabia Dammam (Asia)
- Coordinates: 26°26′N 50°06′E
- Country: Saudi Arabia
- Province: Eastern Province
- Region: Eastern Arabia
- First settled: 1923; 103 years ago
- Founder: The Dawasir tribe
- Named for: Dammam drum

Government
  - Type: Development Authority / Municipality
  - Body: Sharqia Development Authority (Upper body); Eastern Province Municipality (Lower body)
  - Mayor: Fahd Al-Jubair

Area
  - Capital city: 647 km^{2} (250 sq mi)
  - Land: 800 km^{2} (310 sq mi)
  - Urban: 800 km^{2} (310 sq mi)
  - Metro: 1,471 km^{2} (568 sq mi)
- Elevation: 10 m (33 ft)

Population
  - Capital city: 1,386,671
  - Rank: 5
  - Urban: 1,532,326
  - Metro: 2,743,318 (3rd)
  - Metro density: 1,865/km^{2} (4,830/sq mi)

GDP (PPP, constant 2015 values)
  - Year: 2023
  - Total (Metro): $78.8 billion
  - Per capita: $59,300
- Time zone: UTC+03:00 (SAST)
- Area code: 013
- Website: www.eamana.gov.sa

Dammam (Arabic: الدمام, romanized: ad-Dammām) is the seat and largest city of the Eastern Province of Saudi Arabia. An industrial port city on the coast of the Persian Gulf, it had a population of 1,386,166 as of 2022, making it the country's fifth-largest city after Riyadh, Jeddah, Mecca, and Medina. Dammam forms the core of the Dammam metropolitan area, also known as Greater Dammam, which includes the neighboring governorates of Khobar and Qatif. As of 2022, the metropolitan area's population was 2,743,318, making it the third-largest in the country.

== Overview ==
The area that eventually became Dammam was settled by the Dawasir tribe around 1923, with permission from King Ibn Saud. The area was originally a fishing hamlet. It developed after the discovery of oil in the region, becoming a port city and an administrative center. Following the unification of Saudi Arabia, Dammam was made the capital of the newly formed Eastern Province.

Dammam is known for being a major administrative center for the Saudi oil industry, contributing to the export volume of the city's King Abdulaziz Port. With a cargo capacity of 2,038,787 TEUs as of 2022, the port is the second-largest on the Persian Gulf, the third-largest in Saudi Arabia, and the eighth-largest in the Middle East and North Africa by cargo capacity.

The city and the rest of the Eastern Province are served by King Fahd International Airport (KFIA), the largest airport in the world in terms of land area (approximately 780 km^{2} [300 sq mi]), located about 31 km (19 mi) northwest of the city.

== History ==
=== 1800s ===
In 1866, the United Kingdom of Great Britain and Ireland launched an attack on the fort at Dammam, which was under the control of the Second Saudi state. The British forces were ultimately defeated, and the attack was repelled.

=== Search for and discovery of oil (1932–1940s) ===
The planning of drilling wells in Dammam started in the spring of 1933 in Jeddah, when an oil concession agreement was signed by both the government of King Abdulaziz and the representatives of The Standard Oil Company of California. A team of geologists was sent to Dammam. They finalized their plans for the wells in the beginning of June 1934. The work on the cellar for the first drilling rig in Dammam started approximately in January 1935, and ended on 19 February 1935. On 30 April 1935, the work began on drilling the first oil well in Dammam. When Dammam No. 1 didn't produce promising result, the work on it stopped on 4 January 1936, and Dammam No. 2 was drilled. Because of the promising results, there were plans to drill 5 more wells in the surrounding area of Dammam No. 2. Between June and early September 1936, the production of all of these drills were monitored closely, and most of them were disappointing. On 7 December 1936, the work started on Dammam No. 7. At the beginning the drilling didn't produce promising results. However, by 4 March 1938, Well No. 7 started producing a promising amount of oil. Saudi Aramco dug the famous Dammam No. 7, now designated the 'Prosperity Well,' that proved that the kingdom possessed an oversized supply of hydrocarbons.

=== Modern history (1960s–present) ===
Within a few decades, a locality that had several hundred inhabitants some sixty years ago now boasts a population of more than 1.5 million, and is still growing at a sustained high rate. The Dammam area, unlike other oil towns, has developed in multiple fields. Including hosting the administration of the Saudi oil industry, it is also a contemporary urban and industrial center. As this sector was growing within the early years, the Saudi government took steps to facilitate the evolution of the area. New roads and highways connected the booming city to other urban and industrial centers within the Kingdom. A railway line connected Dammam to the agricultural center of Kharj and on to Riyadh. Dhahran International Airport was established in 1961 to further enhance the region's connection to other parts of the country and the world. Later, all commercial air transport facilities were transferred to the larger King Fahd International Airport in 1999, approximately 20 kilometers (12 miles) northwest of Dammam. To encourage the expansion of non-oil industries, an industrial city was established within the open space between the three cities. Now home to 124 factories, the first Industrial City of Dammam was quickly surrounded by an urban mass. As a result, a second industrial city was established further far from the Dammam Area along Highway 615. Located on nearly 6,000 acres (2,400 ha) of land, the second Industrial City is home to 120 factories, with 160 others under construction. These plants manufacture a range of products that are marketed throughout the kingdom and also exported to other countries. Handling such exports and other imports is carried out by several shipping agents and commercial companies spread throughout the area.

The Dammam Area was designed from the outset on the principles of contemporary urban planning. Residential areas are clearly separated from commercial ones, the roads are broad and straight and buildings conform to a plan. One of the most significant factors contributing to the growth of the area was land reclamation; vast stretches of the shallow Persian Gulf were reclaimed. Water is provided by desalination plants that pump approximately seven million cubic feet of treated water every day. The supply of water underpins the urban and industrial growth of the Dammam Area, being made for expanding existing desalination facilities to satisfy future growth. Dammam is a member city in the World Energy Cities Partnership (WECP).

== Geography ==
=== Climate ===
Much like most of Saudi Arabia, Dammam features a Hot desert climate (BWh) under the Köppen climate classification.

Winter temperatures range from mild to warm, but cam drop to as low as around 1 °C (34 °F) in extreme cases at night. Rainfall in Dammam is generally sparse, and usually occurs in small amounts in the winter months of November, December and January; with periodic heavy thunderstorms. Hail generally falls during the colder months of December and January. Lighter showers occur during spring but are much rarer.

Summer temperatures are extremely hot, owing to the region's geographic location; and continually exceed 40 °C (104 °F) during daylight hours from May to September during summer with nighttime temperatures sometimes higher than 35 °C (95 °F) and very high humidity, due to the urban heat island effect. Dust storms, known locally as shamals, are common in summer, and generally come from the north.

Extreme temperatures in the area have ranged from 51 °C (124 °F) on 13 August 2021 to 0.8 °C (33.4 °F) on 16 January 2008.

Climate data for Dammam (1991–2020)
Month	Jan	Feb	Mar	Apr	May	Jun	Jul	Aug	Sep	Oct	Nov	Dec	Year
Record high °C (°F)	32.1 (89.8)	36.0 (96.8)	42.8 (109.0)	47.6 (117.7)	48.0 (118.4)	50.3 (122.5)	50.8 (123.4)	51.0 (123.8)	48.8 (119.8)	46.0 (114.8)	39.3 (102.7)	33.0 (91.4)	51.0 (123.8)
Mean daily maximum °C (°F)	21.5 (70.7)	23.8 (74.8)	28.9 (84.0)	34.5 (94.1)	40.6 (105.1)	43.8 (110.8)	45.2 (113.4)	44.8 (112.6)	41.9 (107.4)	37.4 (99.3)	28.9 (84.0)	23.3 (73.9)	34.5 (94.1)
Daily mean °C (°F)	15.3 (59.5)	17.1 (62.8)	21.4 (70.5)	26.9 (80.4)	32.6 (90.7)	35.8 (96.4)	37.1 (98.8)	36.3 (97.3)	33.2 (91.8)	28.8 (83.8)	22.2 (72.0)	17.0 (62.6)	27.0 (80.6)
Mean daily minimum °C (°F)	9.9 (49.8)	11.4 (52.5)	14.9 (58.8)	20.1 (68.2)	25.0 (77.0)	27.8 (82.0)	29.6 (85.3)	28.9 (84.0)	25.7 (78.3)	21.5 (70.7)	16.5 (61.7)	11.8 (53.2)	20.3 (68.5)
Record low °C (°F)	0.8 (33.4)	1.8 (35.2)	5.9 (42.6)	9.8 (49.6)	17.5 (63.5)	21.3 (70.3)	25.0 (77.0)	19.0 (66.2)	19.2 (66.6)	14.9 (58.8)	7.0 (44.6)	1.8 (35.2)	0.8 (33.4)
Average precipitation mm (inches)	16.2 (0.64)	11.0 (0.43)	8.3 (0.33)	10.8 (0.43)	2.9 (0.11)	0.0 (0.0)	0.0 (0.0)	0.0 (0.0)	0.0 (0.0)	0.5 (0.02)	20.7 (0.81)	16.9 (0.67)	87.3 (3.44)
Average precipitation days (≥ 0.1 mm)	2.3	1.7	2.5	2.0	0.4	0.0	0.0	0.0	0.0	0.1	2.4	1.9	13.3
Average relative humidity (%)	59	54	41	36	26	20	23	34	37	48	53	59	41
Source: World Meteorological Organization, Jeddah Regional Climate Center (humidity 1985-2010)

== Environment ==
=== Environmental concerns ===
There is evidence that several building foundations and underground infrastructures in Dammam have been structurally weakened by a rising water table. Various sources, including precipitation, seawater intrusion and leakage from underground water networks and sewage pipes, were anecdotally suspected to be contributors to the rising shallow water-table problem. A recent study by T. M. Iwalewa and others has revealed that leakages from drinking-water supply and sewage-collection pipe networks are the major contributors to the rise in the water table in the city. The study showed that the rising shallow water-table problem represents a serious threat to the present and future development of the city.

== Economy ==
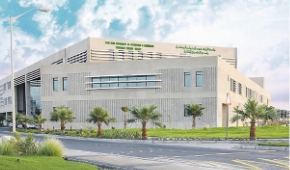
Dhahran Techno Valley

Dammam is an industrialized zone in the eastern province. It is primarily due to the discovery of oil reserves. The city is location of the country's oil and gas industry. Dammam has been a major industrial city of the Middle East. The city contributes greatly to the national economy. The GDP per capita of Dammam is ر.س 87,570. With plethora of oil reserves and presence of necessary infrastructures such as international airport, seaport and cargo terminal contributes to the city's development.

Dammam is predominantly an industrial city, whose economy relies on the local petroleum industry. Saudi Aramco dominates much of oil sector in the city, as well as in Saudi Arabia. The company's headquarter is located in the nearby city of Dhahran, which also hosts the Residential Camp of Aramco. First oil well in Saudi Arabia was discovered in Dammam, by which, Saudi Arabia today leads in the global oil and gas industry. The well was later named as "Al-Khair". Jubail Industrial City, world's largest industrial city is located in nearby city of Jubail. Dammam is an import hub for agricultural products, beefs and dairy cattle.

3M is process of constructing a large manufacturing plant in Dammam. Hitachi Energy operates a High Voltage factory in Dammam. German multinational Siemens operates a large facility in Dammam to serve its regional customers. Dhahran Techno Valley is a tech hub for Aramco.

== Transportation ==
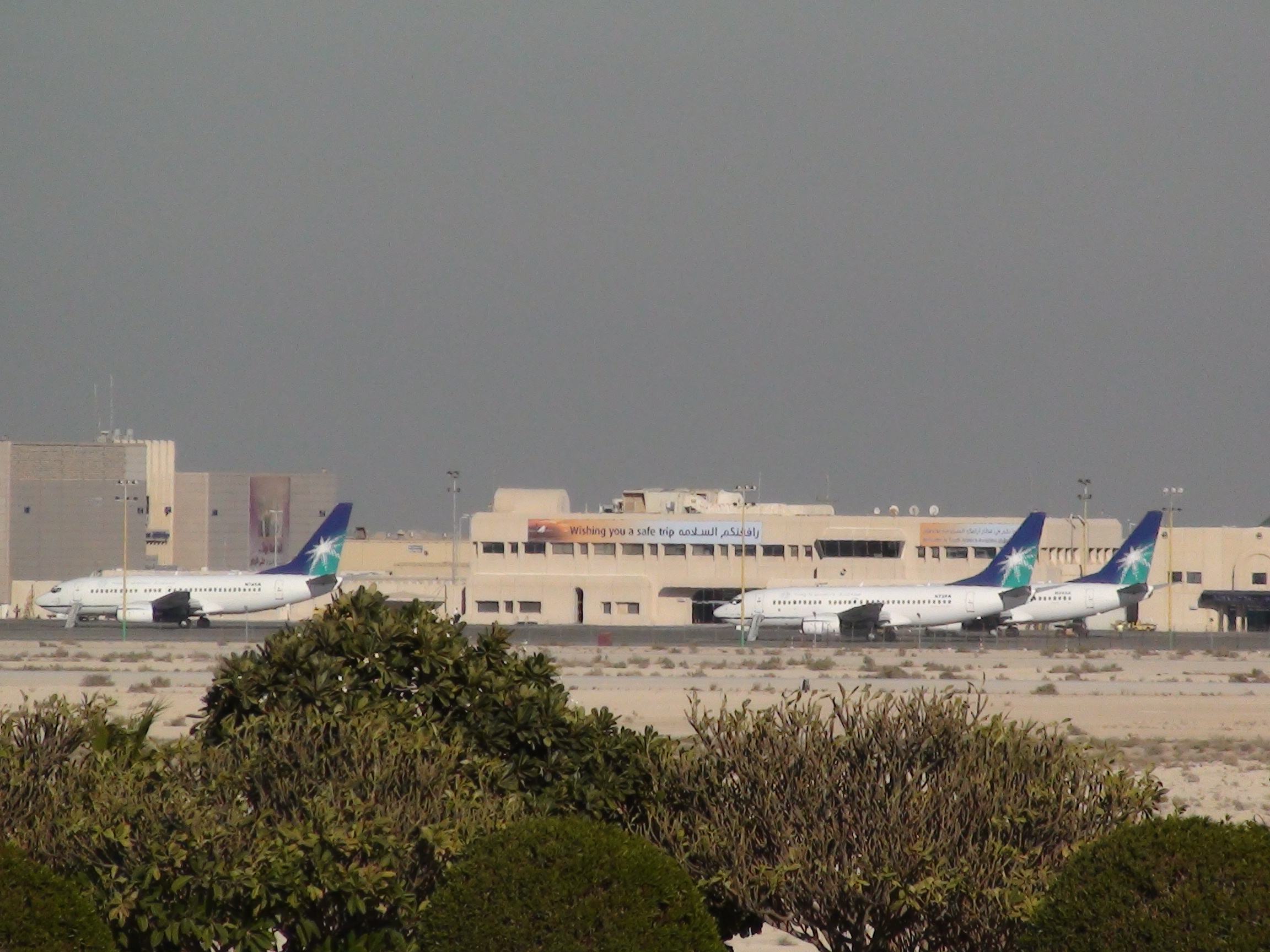
Saudi Aramco airplanes parked in the Aramco terminal at King Fahd International Airport

=== Air ===
Dammam is served by the King Fahd International Airport, the largest airport in the world in terms of land area. The passenger terminal is about 20 km (12 mi) to the northwest of the city and is connected by a six-lane highway. It was opened in 1999. Being the main airport in the Eastern Province, Dammam is well connected by air with other cities in the Middle East, Asia, Africa and Europe. The airport is a hub for Flynas. Dhahran International Airport was the old airport that served Dammam and the Eastern Province. It was the 3rd busiest airport in Saudi Arabia before its closure for the public in 1999.

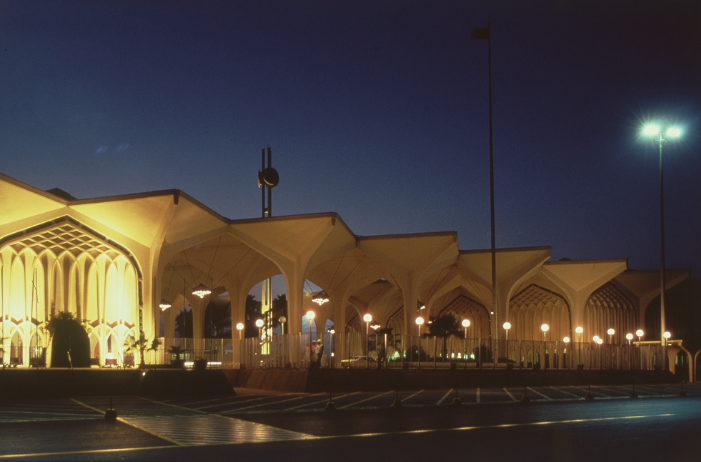
Dhahran International Airport at night

=== Sea ===
The King Abdulaziz Port, located on the coast of the Persian Gulf, is the second largest and second busiest port in Saudi Arabia. It is also the largest port in the Persian Gulf. It was founded in the late 1940s. It has large equipment that allows it to receive various types of vessels. The most important equipments are 56 multi-purpose hoist, 8 container cranes, and 524 tanker containers. There are a number of berths for ships and fishing, as well as ship repair yard.

=== Road ===
Eastern Province cities like Abqaiq, Dhahran, Hofuf, Jubail (Dhahran–Jubail Highway), Khafji, Khobar (Dammam-Khobar Highway), Ras Tanura, Saihat and Qatif (Gulf Road), as well as many cities in other parts of the Kingdom are linked with Dammam by 8–lane highways. Dammam is connected to the Saudi capital, Riyadh and Jeddah on the west coast by Highway 40. It is also linked to Bahrain by the 28 km (17 mi) long King Fahd Causeway. Dammam also has highways to other Middle-Eastern countries such as Kuwait (Abu Hadriyah Highway), Oman, Qatar and the United Arab Emirates.

Intra-city public transport service in Dammam was recently launched. Inter-city bus services are operated from Dammam by the Saudi Public Transport Company services connect Dammam with Khobar and other cities across the Middle East.

=== Rail ===
The Saudi Railways Organization (SRO), which was formerly headquartered in Dammam, was one of Saudi Arabia's two railway operators. It has since been dissolved and merged into the Saudi Railway Company (SAR), which later rebranded itself as Saudi Arabia Railways. The passenger terminal in Dammam was the first built in Saudi Arabia and was built in 1981. It is considered to be a major terminal in the Saudi railway network.

Dammam will serve as an important junction on the proposed Gulf Railway connecting all six GCC member states. The city is located along the proposed main line connecting Kuwait with Oman via Saudi Arabia and the UAE. A branch line connecting Bahrain to Dammam are also part of the proposed project.

Two future railway projects connecting Dammam to Jeddah via Riyadh and Mecca in the western region and Dammam with Jubail have been proposed.

=== Rapid transit ===
An integrated public transport system for Dammam was approved by the Council of Ministers on 19 May 2014, and publicly announced by Mayor Fahad Al Jubair on 21 May 2014. The project includes 50 km (31 mi) of light rail, 110 km (68 mi) of bus rapid transit, and 350 km (220 mi) of feeder buses to link the outskirts of the city. The light rail system will have two lines. The first line will link Tarout Island with King Fahd Causeway via Qatif, Dammam and Dhahran. The second line will connect central Dammam to the King Fahd International Airport. Studies to finalize the alignment and location of the stations should have taken an estimated 18 months. The Dammam Metro is expected to open in 2021, but its current official status is unknown.

The bus rapid transit system was launched in 2023. It mainly covers Dammam, Khobar, Qatif, and Dhahran, over a distance of 453 kilometers, with 212 bus stops.

== Culture ==
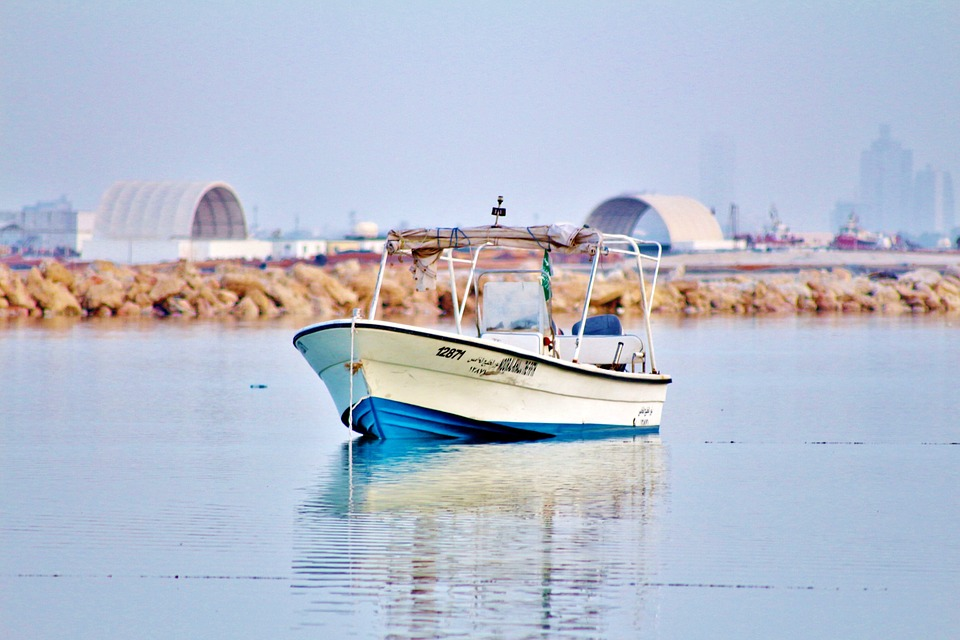
Dammam coast

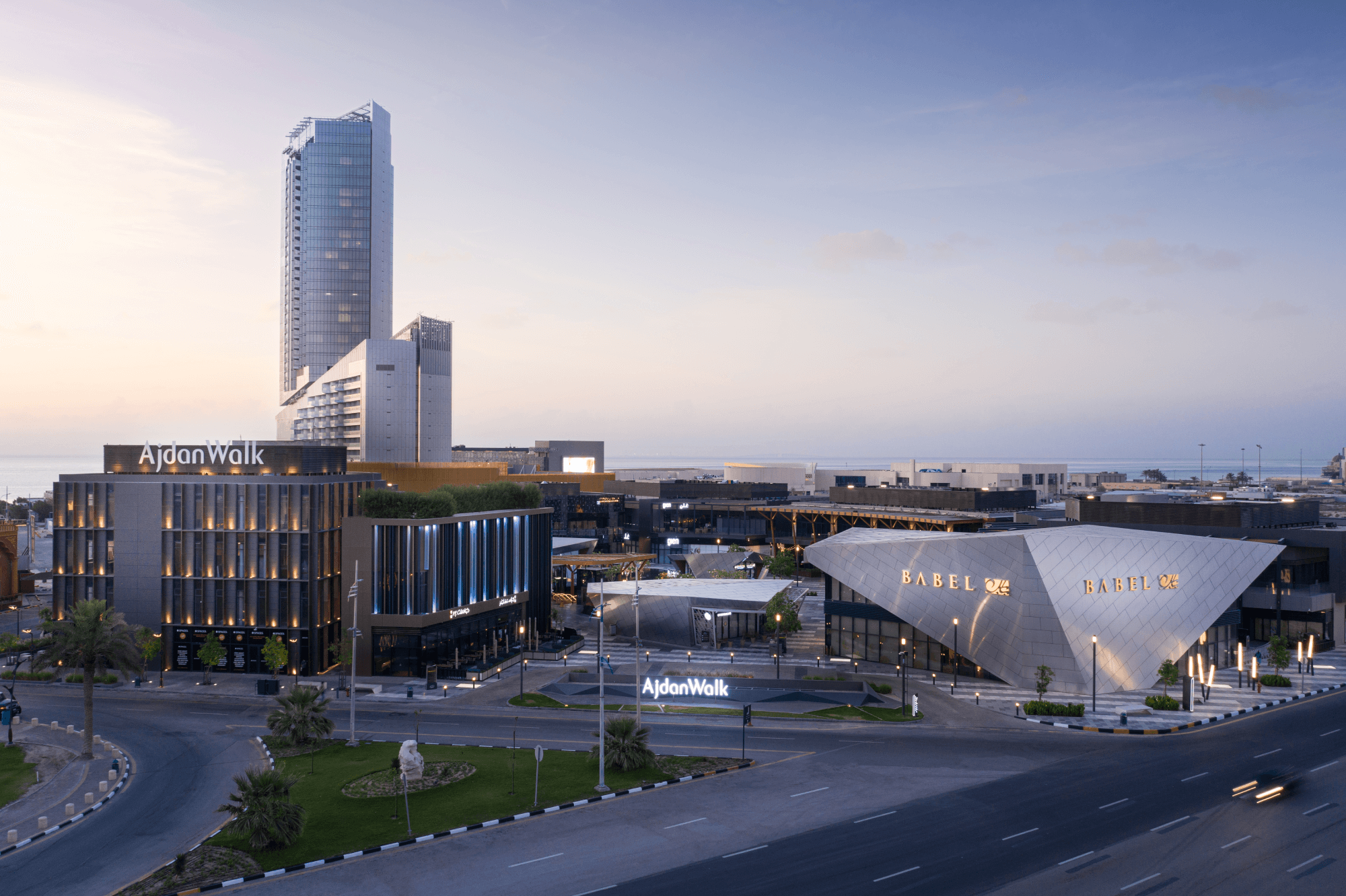
Beachfront

=== Entertainment ===
As part of the Saudi Government's Vision 2030 program that aims at diversifying the non-oil revenues in Saudi Arabia, the Public Investment Fund (PIF) has planned to establish entertainment destinations in the Eastern Province. This would include the establishment of amusement parks and the building of several entertainment facilities such as theatres. The King Salman Energy Park (SPARK) is planned to be established by ARAMCO between Dammam and Al-Ahsa. covering an area of 50 km^{2} (19 sq mi).

The beaches overlooking the Persian Gulf have always been a main destination for locals, especially for fishermen.

=== Sports ===
Football is the national sport of Saudi Arabia and the most popular sport in Dammam. The Prince Mohamed bin Fahd Stadium is the city's main stadium and hosts matches for local clubs. Al-Ettifaq FC also has its own ground, the Al-Ettifaq Club Stadium. More traditional sports such as camel racing, falconry, basketball, and equestrianism are still practiced. Cricket is popular among the South Asian expatriates living in the city.

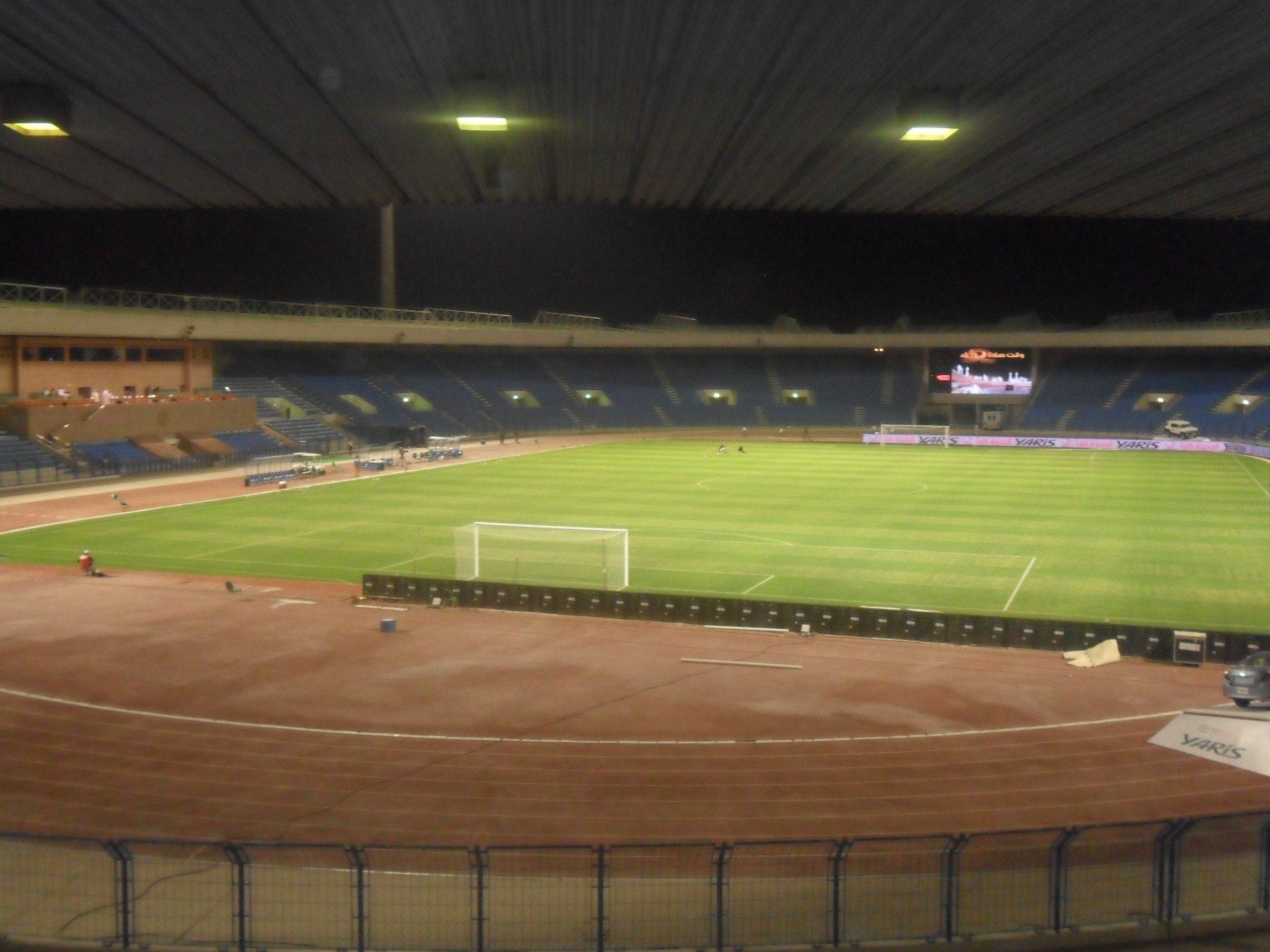
Prince Mohammed bin Fahd Stadium in Dammam

Shopping

Dammam is home to many local markets and malls. Among the local markets are "Souq Al hob" and "Souq Al Dammam". Both of these markets sell commodities that are local to the region and regular commodities as well. Some of the malls in Dammam are "Al othaim Mall", and "Marina Mall", they both provide the customers access to brands that are known around the world.

Many expats choose to congregate in Dammam's shopping and entertainment hubs which at the moment also boast a multiplex showing films in both local and foreign languages.

=== Culture ===
The King Abdulaziz Center for World Culture, also known as Ithra, incorporates a museum, children museum, library, cinema, theater, and exhibition halls. It was designed by the Norwegian architectural firm Snøhetta. The center has been listed in Time magazine as one of the world's top 100 places to visit and attracted one million visitors in 2019.

== Demographics ==
Population

Historical population

Year	Pop.	±% p.a.
2004	745,078	—
2010	903,312	+3.26%

Year	Pop.	±% p.a.
2022	1,386,166	+3.63%

In 1950, Dammam had a population of 22,000. By 2000, the population had soared to 759,000 people. Dammam was the world's tenth fastest-growing city during that 50-year period. According to a report released by the Central Department of Statistics and Information, the population of Dammam was 903,000 as of December 2010, making it the sixth-most populous city in Saudi Arabia and the most populous in the Eastern Province.

According to statistics released by the Ministry of Economy and Planning, in 2011 home ownership among Saudi citizens in Dammam was 42.4%.

== Human resources ==
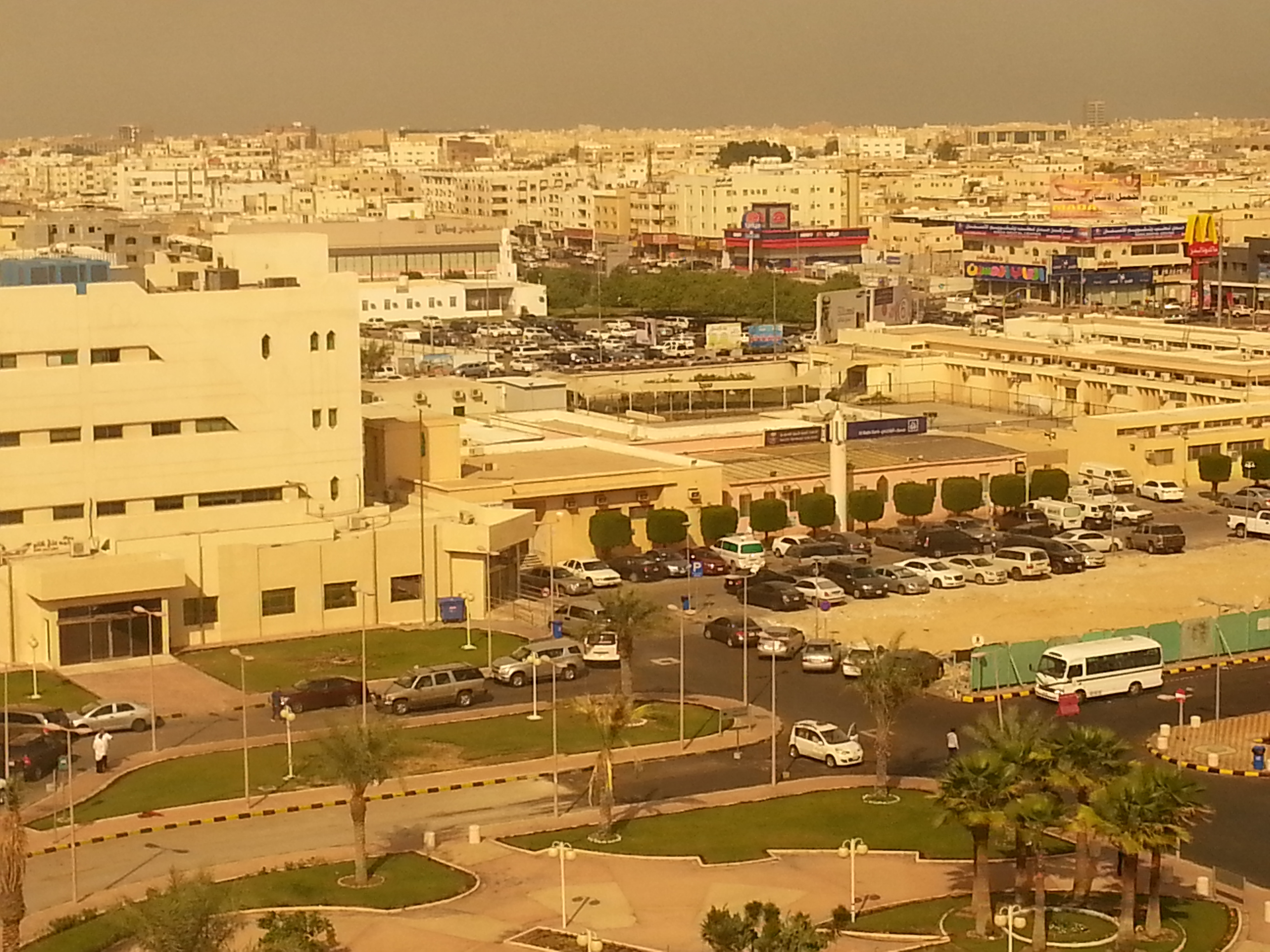
Dammam Medical Complex (also known as the Dammam Central Hospital)

=== Healthcare ===
The Saudi Arabian Ministry of Health oversees the medical facilities across the kingdom. Hospitals and polyclinics located in the urban core of Dammam tend to be concentrated around one central building. Some of the public/government-funded hospitals operated directly by the MoH include the Dammam Medical Complex (also known as the Dammam Central Hospital), the King Fahd Specialist Hospital (KFSH) which shares its compound the Maternity and Children's Hospital (MCH), and the Imam Abdulrahman Bin Faisal Hospital which shares its compound with the Imam Abdulrahman Bin Faisal University. Two hospitals targeting members of the Saudi Arabian Armed Forces are the Security Forces Hospital and the King Fahd Military Medical Complex.

In addition to these public hospitals and polyclinics, several private hospitals and medical centers are also present within Dammam. The most well-known of these is the AGH Dammam or Al Mana Group of Hospitals, Dammam which is part of the Al Mana Group of Hospitals run by Ebrahim Al Mana and Bros., which claims to be the largest medical company & healthcare provider in the Eastern Province. Other private hospitals in and around the city include the Arrawdha Hospital, Al Mouwasat Hospital, the Dammam Private Medical Complex (Formerly Dammam Medical Dispensary), Gama Hospital (formerly Astoon Hospital), among others. One of the largest medical complexes in the kingdom, the Dr. Sulaiman Al Habib Complex is located between Dammam and Khobar off Highway 605.

=== Education ===
Dammam has a large number of schools, universities and colleges. Schools teaching various syllabus and in several different languages of instruction can be found. The largest school in Saudi Arabia and in the Middle East and North Africa, International Indian School Dammam is situated here

==== Primary and secondary education ====
Dammam has a large number of both Saudi and international schools that are either public or private schools. Most of the Saudi schools are public and run by the government, while most of the international schools are private. Most of the international schools are Indian schools affiliated with the Central Board of Secondary Education, although a few schools teaching American, British, Pakistani, Filipino, Bangladeshi curricula, along with schools teaching curricula of other nations also exist.

==== Higher education and research ====
Some of the well-known universities in the region include the Imam Abdulrahman Bin Faisal University (formerly known as the University of Dammam) located off Highway 610, the King Fahd University of Petroleum and Minerals (also known as KFUPM and UPM) which shares its compound with Saudi Aramco and the Prince Mohammad bin Fahd University which is located in south-west Khobar.

== See also ==
- List of cities and towns in Saudi Arabia
- List of governorates of Saudi Arabia
- Modon Lake
