= Ras Tanura =

Governorate in Eastern Province, Saudi Arabia

Ras Tanura رأس تنورة
- Governorate
- Location of Ras Tanura Governorate within the Eastern Province

- Location of Ras Tanura within Saudi Arabia
- Coordinates: 26°42′23″N 50°3′10″E
- Country: Saudi Arabia
- Province: Eastern Province

Government
  - Type: Municipality
  - Body: Ras Tanura Municipality

Area
  - Total: 290 km^{2} (110 sq mi)

Population (2022)
  - Total: 62,314
  - Density: 210/km^{2} (560/sq mi)
- Time zone: UTC+03:00 (SAST)
- Area code: 013

Ras Tanura (Arabic: رأس تنورة), also colloquially known as Rahima, is a governorate in the Eastern Province of Saudi Arabia. Located on the Ras Tanura peninsula, it is bordered by the Jubail governorate to the north and Qatif governorate to the west and south. The area was officially referred to as Rahima from 1941 until 1986, when its historical name was restored.

== Economy ==
The economy of Ras Tanura is heavily anchored by the global energy sector, serving as one of the most critical oil and gas export hubs in the world. The governorate's extensive industrial infrastructure is centrally managed and operated by the state-owned oil giant Saudi Aramco. At the core of its economic output is the Ras Tanura Refinery; originally established in 1939 and expanded significantly in the post-World War II era, it stands as the largest oil refinery in Saudi Arabia, maintaining a crude distillation capacity of 550,000 barrels per day for both domestic consumption and international shipping.

This refining capability is supported by the Ras Tanura Port, the world's largest crude oil export terminal. The facility manages roughly 20 percent of global oil exports and accommodates over 2,000 tankers annually through a sprawling marine complex that includes an artificial island, a northern pier, a southern pier, and the Ju'aymah crude terminal. Additionally, the governorate hosts the Ju'aymah Gas Plant, which is recognized as the world's largest natural gas liquids fractionation plant, alongside the Ghazlan Power Plant, a major steam power facility that supplies a substantial portion of the electrical grid for the industrial operations of the Eastern Province. This dense concentration of heavy industry has generated a robust secondary economy in the region, driving the growth of local maritime supply firms, engineering contractors, and specialized technical training centers that service Aramco's operations.

== Transportation ==
=== Airport ===
Ras Tanura is served by King Fahd International Airport in Dammam. The governorate also has Ras Tanura Airport, a private airport operated by Saudi Aramco for its employees.

=== Road ===
Ras Tanura is connected to the Dhahran–Jubail Highway by a two-lane highway, providing connections to Dammam, Jubail, and Dhahran. The Ras Tanura–Safwa Bridge also connects Ras Tanura with Safwa City in Qatif Governorate.

== Gallery ==
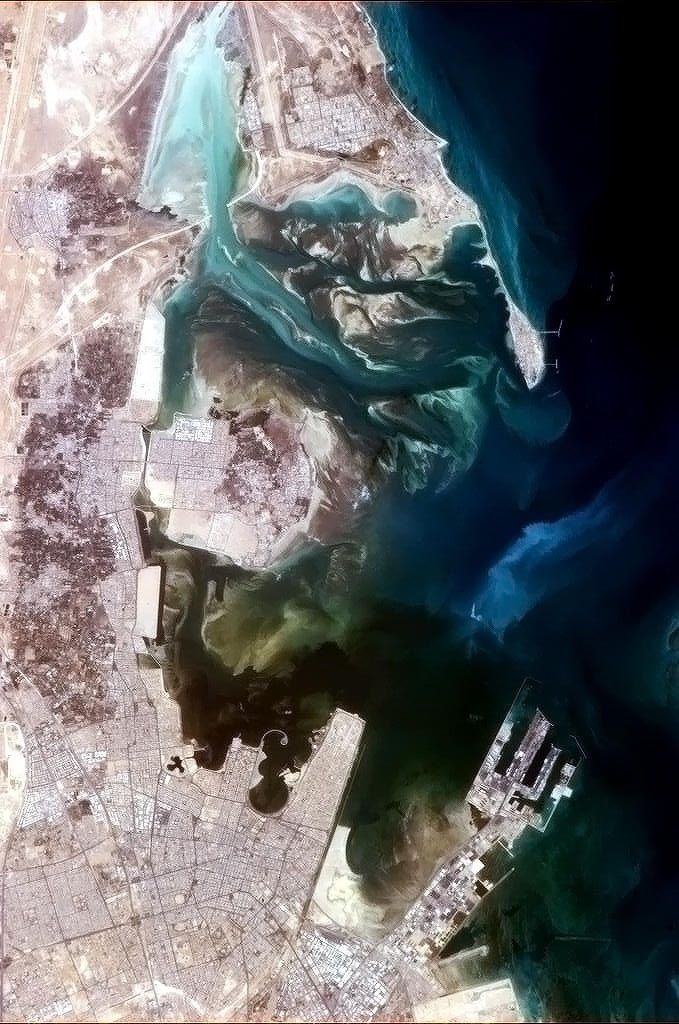
Tarout Bay, seen from the International Space Station; Ras Tanura is on the north side of the bay

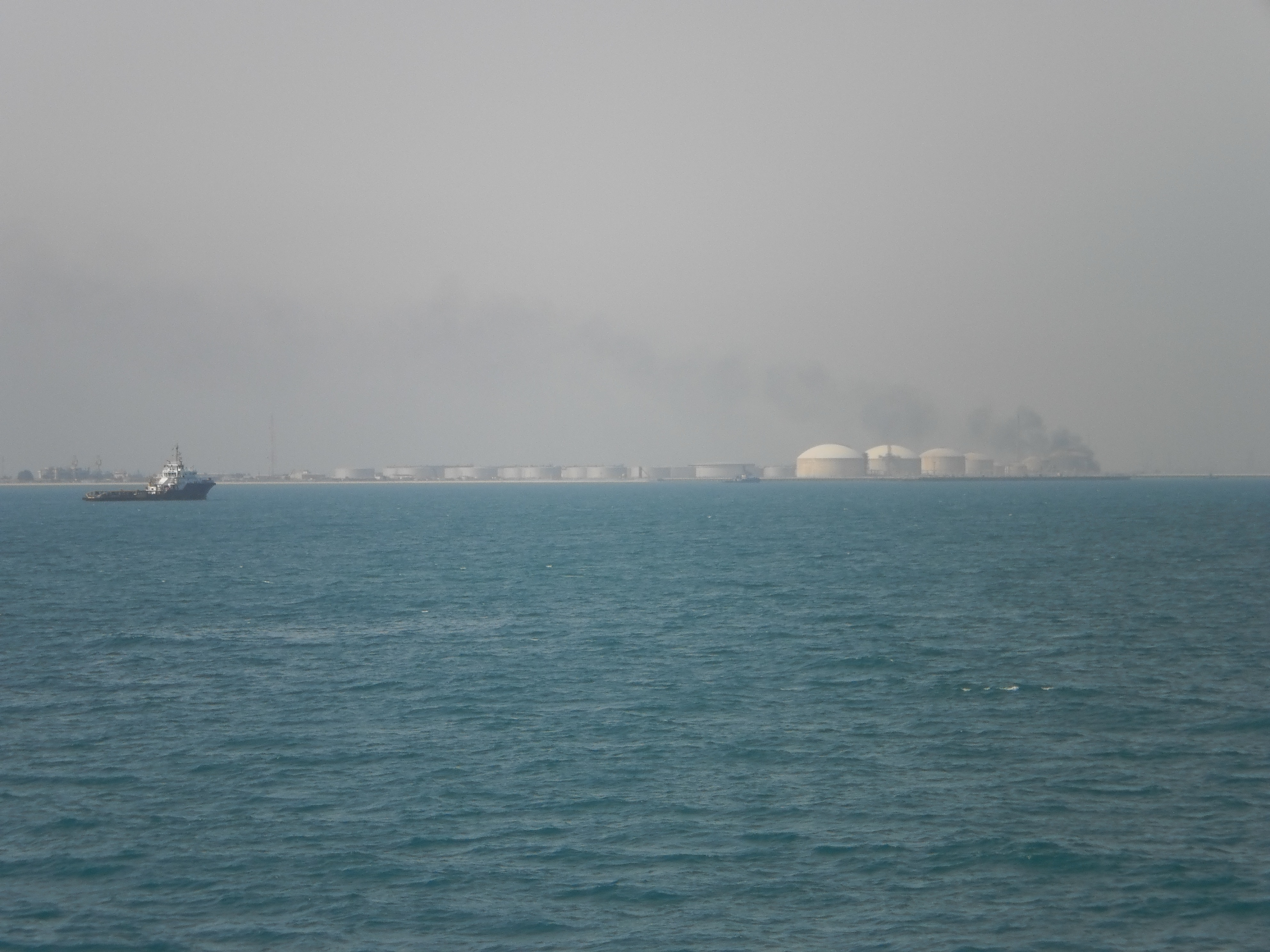
Oil tanks in port

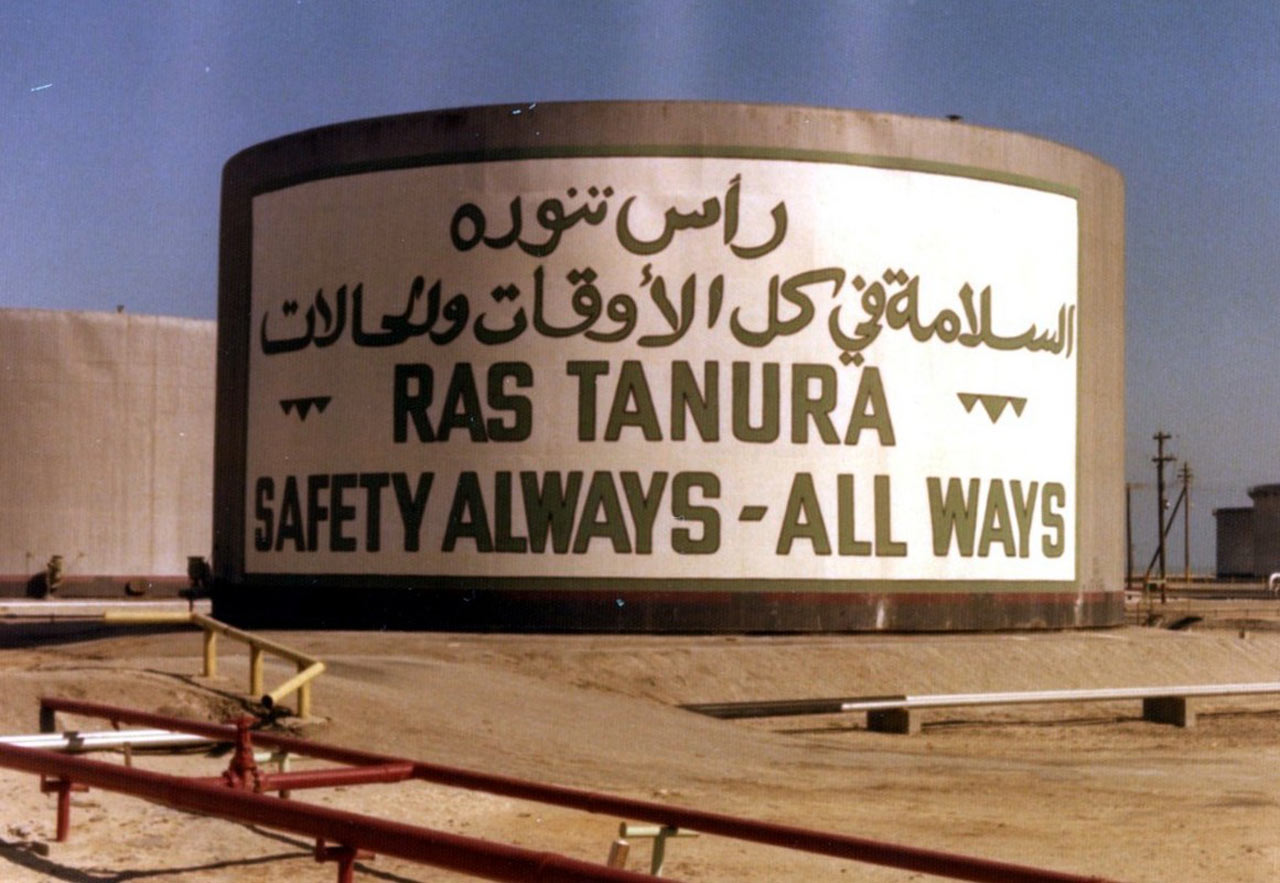
Saudi Aramco Tank in Ras Tanura, 1980s.

== See also ==
- Provinces of Saudi Arabia
- List of islands of Saudi Arabia
- List of governorates of Saudi Arabia
- List of cities and towns in Saudi Arabia
