= Saihat =

Saihat City
- City
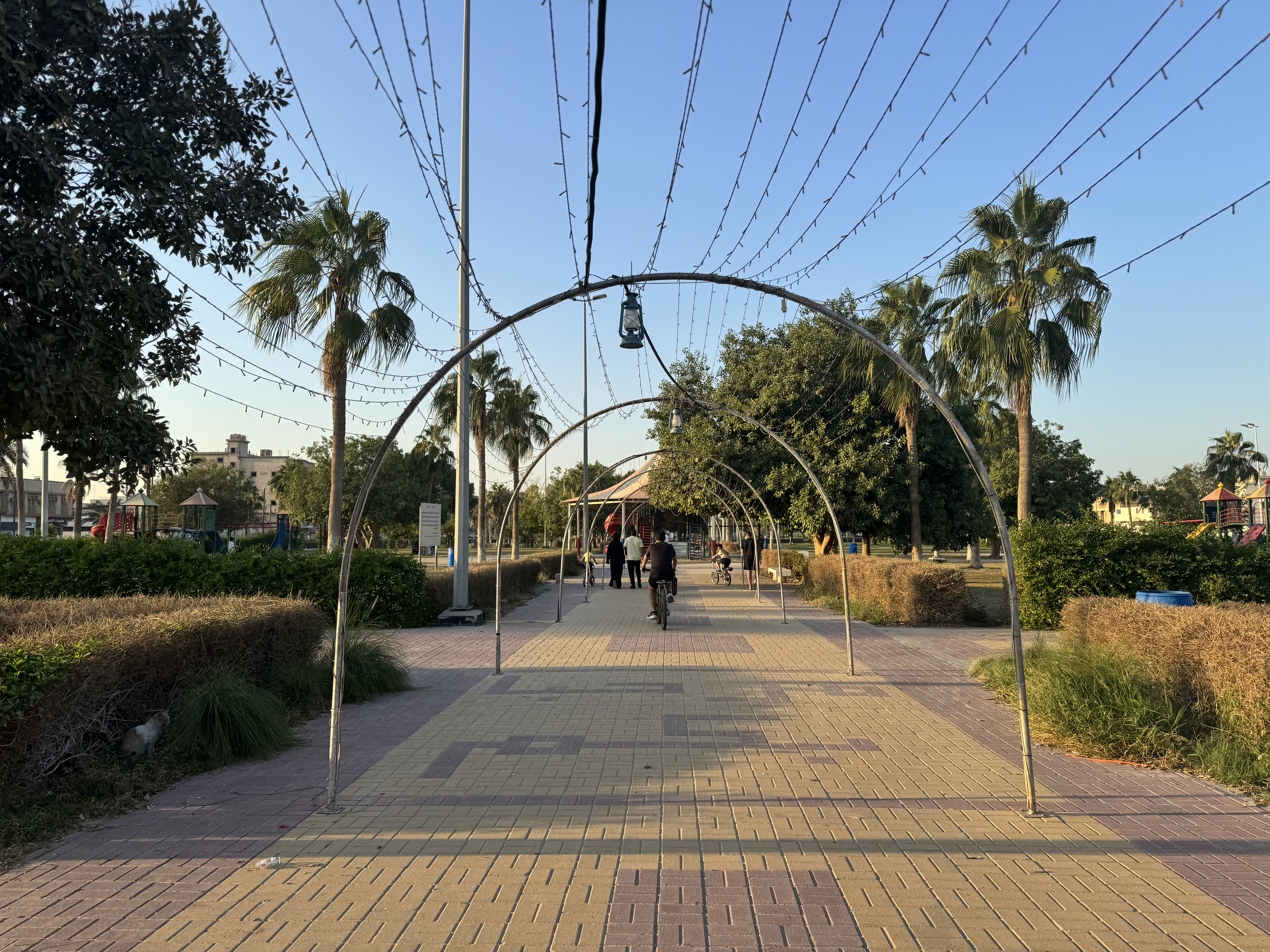
- Saihat Park
- Nickname: The Pearl of the Gulf
- Location Within Saudi Arabia
- Coordinates: 26°28′30″N 50°02′30″E
- Country: Saudi Arabia
- Province: Eastern Province
- Governorate: Qatif Governorate
- Region: Eastern Arabia

Government
  - Type: Municipality
  - Body: Saihat Municipality

Area
  - Total: 5.61 km^{2} (2.17 sq mi)

Population (2022)
  - Total: 84,818
- Time zone: UTC+03:00 (SAST)
- Area code: 013

Saihat City (Arabic: مدينة سيهات) is a city in the Qatif Governorate, located in the Eastern Province of Saudi Arabia.

== History ==
The oldest documents concerning Saihat, which are more than 400 years old, say that Saihat was under the division of Dhahran. During the Ottoman Empire, the cities under Dhahran included Saihat, Bankat, Asseeh, and Aljabba. People in that region built the city of Sawhat on the remains of the old city Avan. This name was mentioned in Al-Musadi's book (التبية والإشراف). The city was renamed Saihat in more modern times.

In English the name of Saihat has various spellings. In the past, it was written as 'Seahat,' but recently the spelling has been changed by some to 'Sayhat.'

== Nature ==
Saihat is located directly on the Gulf. Fishing and agriculture are two important industries. Fertile soil and fresh springs provide a home for palm groves. The oil companies are close to Saihat, many people work there or in activities related to the oil industry.

== Geography and Demographics ==
Saihat is a coastal city located in the Eastern Province of Saudi Arabia. It lies within the Qatif Governorate and shares its southern border with the city of Dammam. The entire eastern edge of Saihat faces the Persian Gulf, giving it a strategic and scenic waterfront. The city covers an area of approximately 5.61 square kilometers and has a population of around 85,000 residents. Saihat is home to a population of Shia Muslims

== Hospitals ==
- Al-Sadiq Hospital
- Al-Madlouh Medical Complex

== Transport ==
=== Airport ===
Air transport is provided by King Fahd International Airport, the terminal is just over driving distance of 40 kilometres (25 mi) from the city.

=== Roads ===
Saihat is directly located on the Highway 613 and has its own exit. The Abu Hadriyah Highway is also nearby, and the city is connected to Dammam via the Gulf Road.

== Sports ==
The city is home to several sports clubs, with Al-Khaleej being the largest and most successful. Based in Saihat, Al-Khaleej is the only club representing the Qatif Governorate in the Saudi Pro League. While its football team is steadily growing in prominence, the club's handball section remains the most popular and accomplished, having achieved both domestic glory and continental success. Al-Khaleej is also set to further strengthen its presence with the construction of its own stadium in Saihat, the upcoming Al-Khaleej Stadium.

== See also ==
- List of governorates of Saudi Arabia
- List of cities and towns in Saudi Arabia
- Shia Islam in Saudi Arabia
