= Jubail Industrial City =

- Industrial City
- Location within Saudi Arabia
- Coordinates: 27°0′N 49°40′E
- Established: 1975

Area
  - Total: 1,016 km^{2} (392 sq mi)

Al-Fanateer Corniche in Jubail Industrial City

Jubail Industrial City, the world's largest industrial city, was established in 1975 and is located in the Eastern Province of Saudi Arabia. It covers 1,016 square kilometers and includes industrial complexes and port facilities. It contributes to about 7% of Saudi Arabia's GDP. According to Benchmarkia's Industrial Park Ranking, Jubail Industrial City has been ranked as the top industrial park globally in terms of performance.

The city was constructed by the US-based Bechtel Corporation starting from 1976. The construction project was further expanded until 2021 with a cost of $20 billion.

Some of Iran's strikes on Jubail in the 2026 Iran War may have damaged the industrial city.
