= Highway 95 (Saudi Arabia) =

Road in Saudi Arabia

Highway 95
- Abu Hadriyah Highway

Route information
- Part of
- Length: 646 km (401 mi)

Major junctions
- South end: King Fahd Causeway
- North end: Highway 40 near Al Nuwaiseeb, Kuwait

Location
- Country: Saudi Arabia
- Provinces: Eastern Province

Highway system
- Transport in Saudi Arabia

Highway 95 (Arabic: الطريق السريع ٩٥, romanized: at-Tariq as-Saree' 95), also known as the Abu Hadriyah Highway, is a major highway in the Eastern Province of Saudi Arabia. Beginning at the Batha' border crossing with the United Arab Emirates, the highway extends to the Kuwaiti border, passing near or through the cities of Khobar, Dammam, Qatif, Jubail and Khafji, spanning 646 km (401 mi). The highway also provides access to the King Fahd Causeway which connects Bahrain to Saudi Arabia.

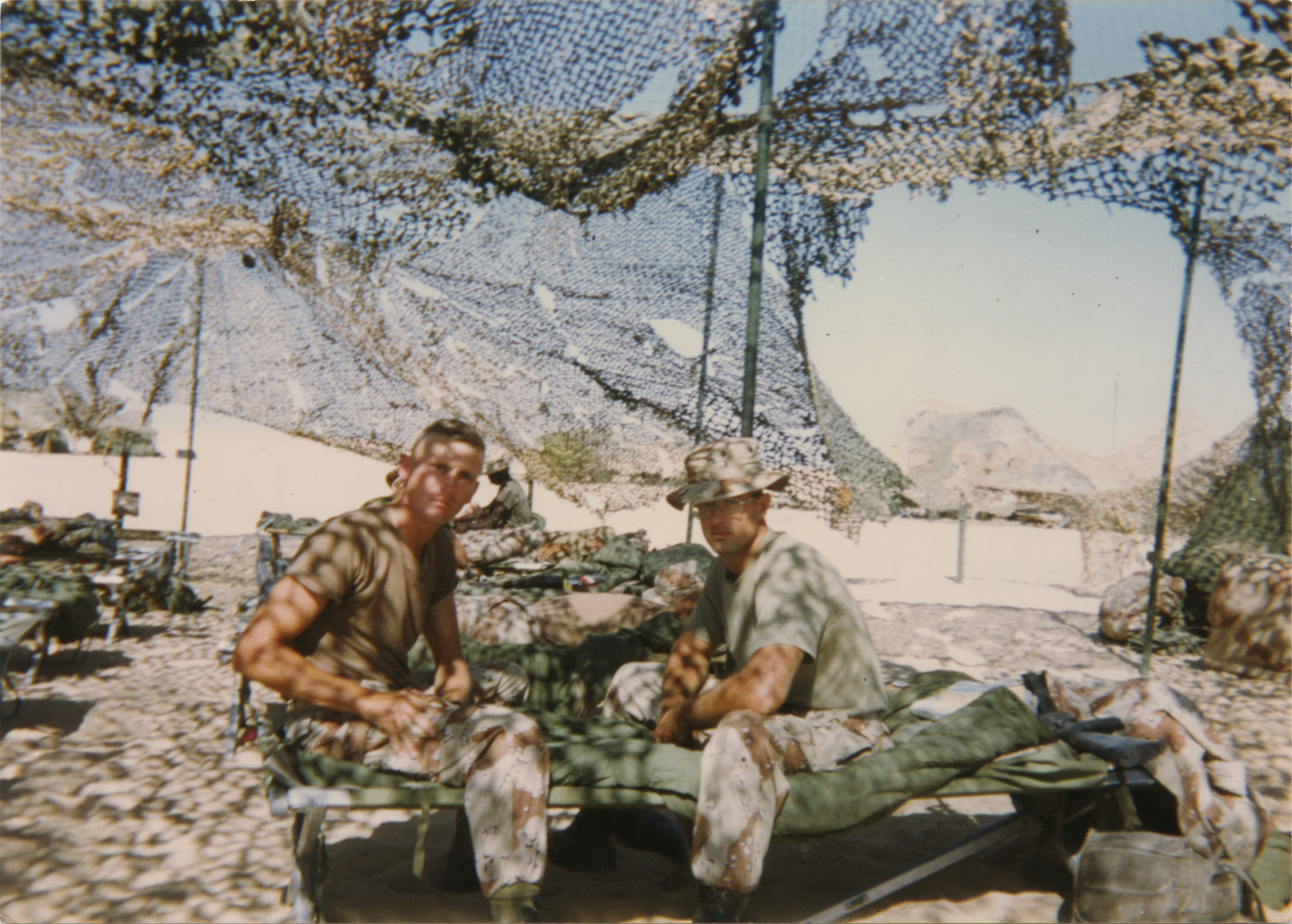

The highway consists of three traffic lanes and a shoulder, for a total of eight lanes, of which six carry traffic. All but one of the intersections of the highway are grade separated (the northernmost intersection with Route 611 is not grade-separated), and the two sides of the road are separated by a median strip. The route traverses the eastern coastal plain of Saudi Arabia, and is thus mostly straight for most of its length, running concurrently with Highway 85 north of Dammam. The concurrency with Highway 85 ends near the town of Abu Hadriyah. The highway runs parallel to the Persian Gulf coast of Saudi Arabia.

It was initially built by a joint venture of Entreprise Jean Lefebvre, a French company, and several Saudi partners, who appealed to hundreds of expatriate men to do the job. Most of these expatriates had the only right to live a single life in camps in the desert during their stays in Saudi Arabia. The highway serves as the main land route for the transport of goods between the eastern Arab countries.
