= Al-Aba Oasis =

Al-Aba oasis

General information
- Location: The eastern region, Saudi Arabia
- Governing body: Prince Saud bin Nayef Al saud

Al-Aba Oasis, or Afnan Oasis is one of the ancient oases in Al-Qatif Governorate, in the eastern region of the Kingdom of Saudi Arabia. Al-Aba Oasis was the capital of the village of Umm Al-Sahek, located to the north of it, with an area of 950 square kilometers.

== Label ==
It is mentioned in historical books by more than one name, including: “Al-Aba’a, Al-Abaa’, and Al-A’b.” It is believed that its origin is the word “Al-Abaa’ Tsahif” Al-Abaa’, with the Ba’al, which often falls between the lettering and the Noun. Such as easing the common people, so they are called “al-hamr” and “al-awr” in “al-Ahmar al-a’war.” And so on in abusive words.

== History ==
the early history of Muslims

The first to speak of it was Al-Masoudi who mentioned it as “Afnan” and said: “Afnan is water and palm trees [...] Al-Abbas bin Amr Al-Ghanawi wanted it to be revealed, and that was when he traveled from the water known as Al-Aba’a. So Abu Saeed preceded him to me with water, and the length of this sabkha is seven miles, and between it and Basra is seven days, and it is two days away from the coast of the sea.” Al-Masoudi continues, saying: “It is Al-Qatif, and between Al-Qatif and the sea is a mile, and it has a city on the coast called Anak.

It was mentioned by Yaqut al-Hamawi, who said: “The mantle, with the opening, then the stillness, a unified Yaa, and an extended thousand; A name for a sabkha known in the district of Bahrain as the shoes of Al-Qatif on the sword of the sea. It has smooth stones. It was called that because every valley played in it, and the attribution to it is similar to the attribution to Sana’ani, and the dogs are attributed to it, so it is said that the dogs are playable.”

Al-Aba without a hamza, with a dam then a sukun, and a unified yaa, so from the play there are palaces: it is a place in the house of Abdul Qais between Oman and Bahrain. “On the authority of Al-Hazmi.”

== Geographical location ==
The location of the Al-Aba oasis is different but is most likely located 8 kilometers northeast of the town of Abu Ma'n and in the northwest of the present-day Umm Al-Sahek. It was one of the branches of the Persian Gulf, but after the sand was dumped, it became a salt mine (or sabkha). The mine was productive until the early 1970s. The area between them has also been curtailed by population creeps and transformed into Sabkha lands, deserts, and farms for local people.

On the other hand, it is believed to be located next to a long Sabkha close to Basra. Hamad al-Jasser counted it from the villages of Jubail southwest of Sabkha al-Rayas, extending to the vicinity of Katif. It passes the road to the old Jubail, marching in Dreidi located in Suad al-Katif, and its rays bulbs separating it from the coast, and the oil pipeline running from Qatif to Qassumah (known as the Tab line) Al-Jasser stated: "In Abi Said al-Karmaty's news with Abbas Ben Amr al-Ghannawi Sunnah 287 AH sent by the supporter to meet him from Basra, it was the well-known Sabkha, preceded him to water, and the length of this Sabkha is seven miles between her and Basra seven days, and she is two days from the sea coast of Kal-Katif, and Katif.

== Oasis village ==
=== Abu ma'an ===
The town of Abu Ma 'an is one of the neighborhoods of the old houses of Oasis al-Aba, in al-Jahliya. After Islam, it became one of the pilgrims' stations coming from the northeast of the Arabian Peninsula. It is believed to be where the Abbasid army was defeated by Qaramta. They were likely fortified sites, many of which were found in the northwest, to break pottery dating back to the Carmelite era, and some foundations for ancient walls were found in one farm.

=== The Ruwayhat ===
Other villages also belonging to them include Northern and Southern Ruihan, which later became a single town because of houses joining. The Ruwayhat and Abu Maan are separated by the route coming from Umm al-Sahak. And rehearsal: It's a minimization of comfort. Rest: Soles of the palm, while others consider that the name is derived from the spirit or rest, as well as rest and soul as well as basil. It was prepared by the Muslim historian Mohammed Said from Qatif villages. Located south of Abu Ma 'an

=== sueaduh ===
Alsueaduh or local utterance is a village located in the northwest of Abba and has enriched its entire archaeological features. Including the famous Eye of Happiness. It is located in the northwest of Katif, west of Umm al-Birdi, and in its north-western tip is also known as Sa ' da. Prepared by the English Orientalist Lorimer of White Water, it is reported to be in the southwest of the tractor by about 14 miles.

=== Umm al birdi ===
A village located in the northwest of Abba between them is at least 6 km. Historian Hamad al-Jasser stated: "Umm al-Birdi is land between Al-Rayyas Sabkhat east and happily west in the Katif area. In its northern tip, a nobleman named Umm al-Birdi. " It is believed that it was a large land before becoming a slur.

=== Make ===
The village of Kuala is southeast of Abba, separated by Abu Adrijah, by miniaturization, as the people of the northeastern region say. It is also called "A green oasis surrounded by sand from all sides. With the expansion of farms and their reliance on artesian irrigation wells, Abu Adrija and Muqalla have merged.

=== Abu Al-Hail ===
The village of Abu al-Hil is located northwest of Ma 'aleh within 3.5 km. It is now a desert with a water eye and is currently overwhelmed by plumage as well as some palm forests

=== Al-sabigawi ===
The village of Sabigawi is 2 kilometers west of Abu Ma 'an and has wall foundations for buildings. Many pottery breaks were found above some sandy hills north and east of Al Ain and in simplified places around the hills. Pottery fractures matched Thaj pottery and southeast Jubail areas. Extract from the ground two stones that had drawings and lines. It is estimated that the length of each is between 50 and 60 cm, the width is between 20 and 25 cm, and the thickness of about 5 cm, and when cleaning the eye of the baby, a lot of pottery pieces are extracted, some of which are colorful and some of which have inscriptions.

=== Aldridge ===
It is a village with a palm near Umm al-Sahak and is 10 km away. The village is located in bundles (anywhere high), sometimes called the Deedri bundles, and it has a western sieve about ten corners from the Katif area. Al-Dreidi is located southwest of Umm al-Sahak's presence within 5 kilometers. Dust was erased by the creeping sand. A large amount of pottery crushes have been found in homes and plantations that plow throughout the year, particularly in the northwest and northeast.

Its name goes back to Dorid: the Dardor miniature and Darfur is one of the deep maritime areas that militates and fears drowning in its waters. Darfur Collection: Dradier, Darfur, or Maritime Dradder is known to those who occupy the sea, so they avoid passing and entering it, and the Sea Dardar is placed in it like the rotating wound that engulfs the water boat. The name of the village is believed to be derived from Darfur al-Dirbat, which rises during the intensification of the wind. Dust takes a high circulation around itself, forming a pole that can be as high as meters. According to others, it is named after Dread, an Arabic flag name.

=== Hazm Umm al-Sahak ===
It is located west of Oasis al-Katif near Umm al-Sahak, west of it, called the Um al-Sahak Packages, and Safwa Packages near it. Umm al-Sahak beams occupy a hill slightly higher than Umm al-Sahak, and the beams are on higher ground than the town's land level near it. His land may be mixed stones with sand, or mud rocks, as in the case of Safwa packages. In the Katif region, three main packages are mentioned:

Safwa, Umm al-Sahak, and Al-Dreidri packages, some of whom are also called beams by Abu Ma 'an, said Yakut al-Hamoui: (There are a lot of beams in the Arabian island and some - fifteen packages).

=== Umm al-Sadiq ===
Before 1958, Umm al-Sahak (equivalent to 1379 AH) consisted of some close neighborhoods, separating narrow cottages from each other. It is surrounded by palm groves from all four ribs, stretching from the fence and a few neighborhoods, one of which is northeast, taking more to the east than north, one south-west and another south-east, the next by size, and six others south of the third. They were all established after some Bedouin Arab families such as Al-Khawald came to them. The town continued to expand further south than north and east. There are about eight neighborhoods between small and large. They also increased in size, especially after the discovery of petroleum.

=== Sfera ===
The village of Safira is located east of the present, and its original name is believed to have been "Safdar." The village of Safira has a famous water eye in the region and is autonomous. In the north lies Muqtab, which in turn is divided into two parts east and west thanks to the Jubail Highway, a populated area.

=== Sabkha ===
Sabkha or Sabkhat al-Malh is a village that used to be a salt mine. In its northwest, there are some palm forests and sandy hills, which are considered an extension of the island area, which is located southeast of Al-Aba. And to the east of it lies the Bimbri region, which in turn was divided into two parts, east and west, by the Jubail-Dammam highway as well, and the sabkha: it is the land whose soil is abundant in salts, and it is moist because it is often located near the coasts and the low places where torrents gather . Marshes are spread in the eastern region along the seashore. It is believed that its original name was (dye), not sabkha.

=== Al-maqta'a ===
Al-Maqta’a (and it was mentioned in the records of Saudi Aramco in Al-Muqat’a) is located south-east of Bambari east of South Sabkha al-Salah and is called the clip: because the water exceeds the need of the palm plantations north of the present as well as its eyes are coming from south to north, until it finally pours into Sabkha al-Salh.

=== Al-Sarawi ===
Al-Sarawi or al-Suroat are three plates located south of the village of Maqtah. They are Surat Al Jazeera, Surat Al Zabiga, and Surat Djin. Aramco Photographer of 1964 A.H. 1384 replied.

=== Abu shamila ===
The village of Abu Shamila is located in the northeast of the village of Sangha al-Salh. It is one of the region's ancient regions, and most of its effects have been destroyed. One of the most prominent is her famous eyes for her water's torment and conquest. Sheikh al-Jasser called it "Abu Seila" and stated that it (from the waters of the Qatif area, north of Safwa for about six miles). About the Book of Gulf Guide. They produced abundant crops of fruits as well as palm trees. Her name was taken from Abu Shamila, a local name for a creeping insect, and she was also named Abu Thaila after Ain. Whereas Thailand was an old eye covered by sand. In one of Abu Shamila's hills, he found large numbers of white and colored crockery pieces with handles and stones glued together by plaster material, which he inferred as residues of the walls of extinguished buildings.

=== Khartoum ===
Khartoum is a town in the southeast of Oasis. In the north are the smokehouse unit and its pervasive north. And in the west the unit of the anchor or. Khartoum is located just south of the Umm al-Sahek packages, separated by the street to Abu Ma 'an. It is believed that its name is taken from a splash, and the splash is the sound of friction of palm fronds due to the constant wind blowing over the town and palm convergence. The bold historian considers her original name to be "terns" and to say "terns" to be a misrepresentation of terns. This position was reported in Arjoza and Hab Ben Greer Al-Jahmi in the description of the road between the Tunb and Maoist, that he and his relatives walked from the terns when it appeared to come, and that they lived in the Tunb. He said after mentioning their walk from Maoism after the dark prayer (evening prayers):

=== Nazira ===
Nazira is a village in the northwest of Umm al-Sahak packs. Areas, where they were inhabited, included Seal and Sidra, located west of Khartouchia and Sawada, and some old housing units, merged with areas close to them and made it difficult to distinguish between them, owing to the tyranny of one's name over the other, some of which were annexed by palm plantations and the area's urbanization. Nadera is a name given to a place whose land is mostly sand. Historians believe that its origin is “Nazira” and not “Nadra”. And the “beholder” is the observer. It may also be derived from splendor, meaning the beauty that is glorified.

=== Damirah ===
Damira" or "Damirah" or "Damira", and it is also pronounced "Dhimira" or "Dhimira". It is a village located west of Awena Ibn Dalian, and it has a spring of water that used to flow in floods. The traces of the village disappeared completely. Yaqut al-Hamawi mentioned it in Bilad al-Sham and (from the works of Oman).

=== Dbayeh ===
Al-Dabiya is a sabkha located west of Al-Qatif, extending north to the alignment of “Ras Abu Merikha” west of the Al-Riyas sabkha, and south to the alignment of Dhahran, and it is one of the longest sabkhas. Its name is likely attributed to the lizard. While others suggest that the origin of the name was originally a doe that turned its za’a into that.

=== Kazem ===
Al-Kazim was one of the villages that became deserted and turned into a swamp due to its proximity to the coast and the encroachment of desert sands on it. And Al-Kadhim collected it as Kadhem: from the names given by the Sassanids to some areas in the western Persian Gulf, Al-Yamani market north of Al-Dabiya, Al-Sidra, and Abu Hamza. These areas are an extension of the shrine area.

== Literature and popular culture ==
The people of Al-Aba are a tree in the shade of the two universes

It was continued by the Chosen One, the noble Prophet

O one who praises God, say what is zen?

Increase your prayers upon Muhammad, and God will pay off the debt

The people of Medina, Al-Khatti, and Bahrain are among you who are proud of their religion and where they are

== See also ==
- Al-Zara
- Al Qadih
- Umm al-hamam
- Halla Mahesh
