= Mohammed Hussein Al-Ammar =

Saudi Arabian put on the Kingdom most wanted list

Mohammed Hussein al-Ammar
- Born: Saudi Arabia
- Occupation: suspected terrorist

Mohammed Hussein al-Ammar (Arabic: محمد حسين علي آل عمار) is a citizen of Saudi Arabia who the Kingdom put on its most wanted list. He was placed on the list in 2016, along with 8 other men.

Al-Ammar was captured by Saudi authorities on January 8, 2019, in the Al-Bahari district of Qatif, Eastern Province. His capture left just three of those nine men at large. The other five had all died. Al-Ammar was captured, in spite of firing upon the arresting officers when they called upon him to surrender.

Authorities reported he had, in his hideout, a molotov cocktail, a machine gun, two pistols, a large supply of ammunition, and a cache of currency. Asharq al-Awsat reports al-Ammar was accompanied by several confederates, during the shootout, one of whom died.

Asharq al-Awsat reports that, in 2017, he "masterminded" the kidnapping of Sheikh Mohammed bin Abdullah Al-Jirani. They reported that his subordinates were Abdullah Ali Al Darwish, Mazen Al Qaba, Mustafa Salman Al Sihwan, Maitham Al Qadihi and Ali Bilal Al Hamad. Al-Ammar and his confederates eventually murdered Al-Jirani, a judge in the Endowments and Inheritance Department.
