= Mohammed bin Abdullah Al-Jirani =

Saudi Arabian judge kidnapped and murdered by terrorists

- Born: Saudi Arabia
- Died: Qatif
- Occupation: Judge
- Known for: vocal critic of Iran

Mohammed bin Abdullah Al-Jirani (Arabic: محمد بن عبد الله بن علي بن صالح الجيراني) was a Saudi Arabian judge who was kidnapped and murdered by terrorists.

Al-Jirani had been appointed a judge in the Endowments and Inheritance Department, and, according to the Saudi Gazette, had survived three previous attempts on his life. The Saudi Gazette described him as outspoken in his criticism of Iran.

Al-Jirani's house was set on fire in 2011. Armed men unsuccessfully attacked his home in 2012. The successful capture took place on December 13, 2016. His post-mortem suggested he had been tortured prior to his execution.

Al-Jirani's body was discovered on December 25, 2017, and three men suspected of playing a role in his murder were apprehended: Abdullah Ali Ahmed Al-Dirweesh, Mazen Ali Ahmed and Mustapha Ahmed Salman Al-Sahwanb. Other suspects remained at large, including: Mohammed Hussain Ali Al-Ammar, Maitham Ali Mohammed Al-Qidaihji, Ali Bilal Saud Al-Hamad, Zaki Mohammed Salman Al-Faraj and Salman bin Ali Salman Al-Faraj.

Al-Ammar was captured, following a shoot-out, on January 8, 2020. Saudi authorities described him as the "mastermind".

On September 30, 2018, King Salman bin Abdulaziz Al Saud posthumously awarded al-Jirani a First Class of King Abdulaziz Medal.
