= Al-Jaroudiya =

Al-Jaroudiya الجارودية
- Location within Saudi Arabia
- Coordinates: 26°32′30″N 49°59′12″E
- Country: Saudi Arabia
- Province: Eastern Province
- Governorate: Qatif Governorate

Population (2022)
  - Total: 20,986
- Time zone: UTC+03:00 (SAST)

Al-Jaroudiya (Arabic: الجارودية) is a town in the Qatif Governorate, located in the Eastern Province of Saudi Arabia.

== History ==
Jaroudiya is situated to the northwest of Umm Al-Hamam, near Badr al-Badrani—a historic rest stop for pilgrims during the era when camels were the primary means of desert travel. The town is located atop the Sald Mountains. Families originating from the area are commonly known as Jaroudi, Jarudi, or Al-Jaroudi. Like the rest of the Qatif Governorate, Jaroudiya is home to a predominantly Shia Muslim population.

== See also ==
- List of governorates of Saudi Arabia
- List of cities and towns in Saudi Arabia
