= Al-Awjam =

Al-Awjam الأوجام
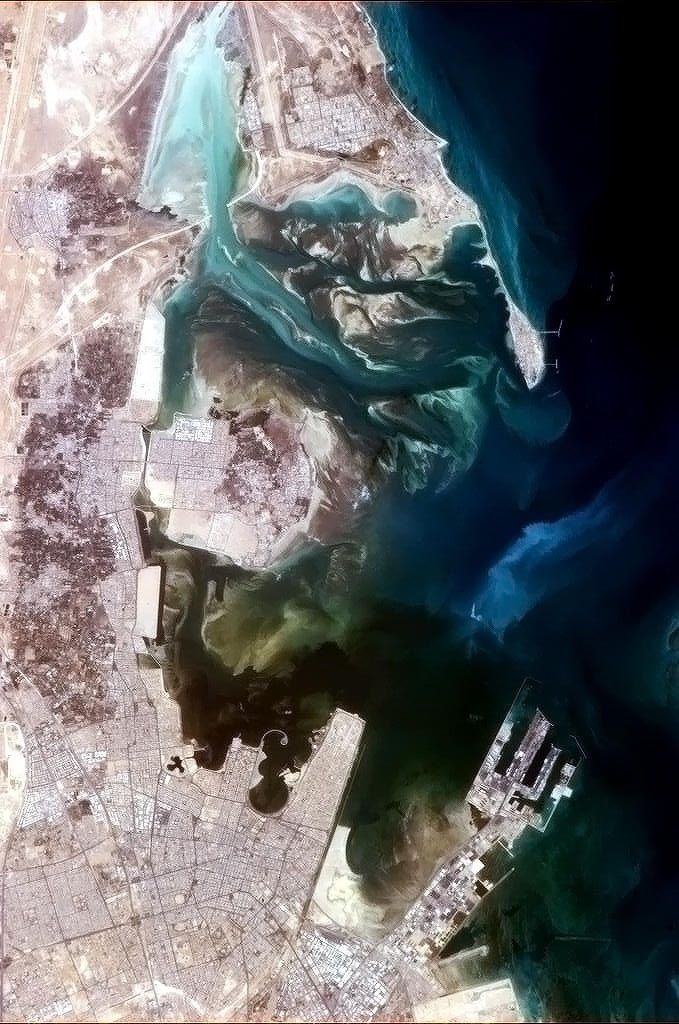

- Location within Saudi Arabia
- Coordinates: 26°33′30″N 49°57′1″E
- Country: Saudi Arabia
- Province: Eastern Province
- Governorate: Qatif Governorate
- Administrative authority: Safwa City

Population (2022)
  - Total: 16,147
- Time zone: UTC+03:00 (SAST)

Al-Awjam (Arabic:الأوجام) (locally known as Lājām [laː.dʒaːm]) is a town in the Qatif Governorate, located in the Eastern Province of Saudi Arabia.

== Overview ==
Al-Awjam and, like most cities in the region, is home to a large Shia Muslim population. This contrasts with the majority of Saudis, who are Sunni. As a result, sectarian tensions exist, especially during the Shia holy day of Ashura: however, the conflict has reportedly eased since 2005.

== See also ==
- List of governorates of Saudi Arabia
- List of cities and towns in Saudi Arabia
