= Sayadieh =

Fish and rice dish from Egypt

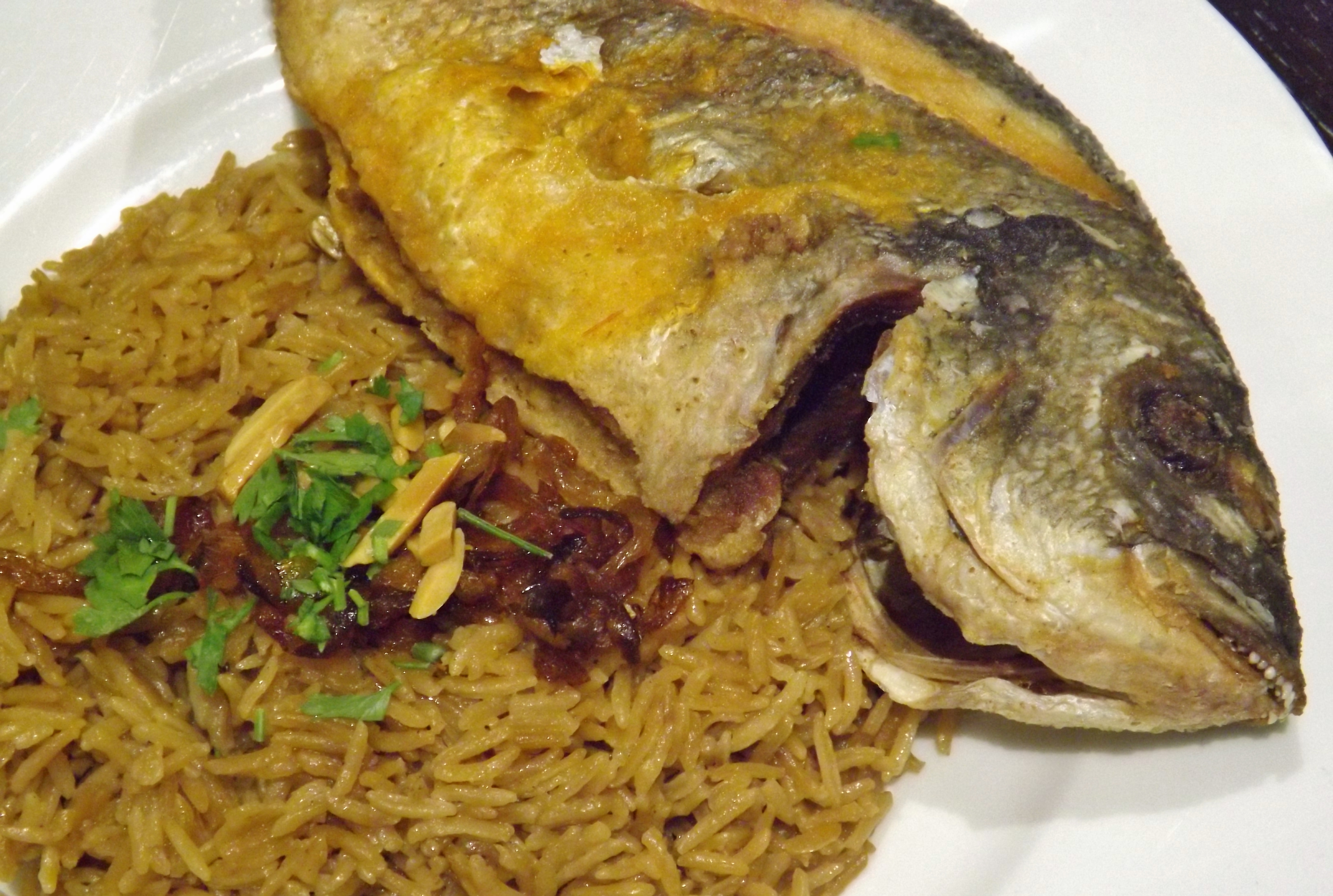
- Seasoned fish served over rice and garnished with pine nuts
- Course: Main dish
- Region or state: Middle East
- Serving temperature: Hot
- Main ingredients: White fish such as cod or haddock, cumin, onion, rice, baharat, pine nuts

Sayadieh (Arabic: صيادية) is a seasoned fish and rice dish from the Middle East, made with cumin and other spices, as well as fried onions. The spice mix is called baharat in Arabic and its preparation varies from cook to cook but may include caraway, cinnamon, cumin and coriander.

Historically, it was a fisherman's meal originating on the Mediterranean coast of Egypt, Syria, Palestine, and Lebanon, but the dish can now be found throughout the Middle East. It is a staple of coastal cities in the Arab world.

== Etymology ==
The word sayadieh is derived from the Arabic word sayad (صياد), meaning "fisherman".

== History ==
An 1890 cookbook by Lebanese author Khalil al-Khuri lists 3 recipes for sayadiyeh, 2 made with fish, rice, and onions, and one made with octopus.

== Preparation ==
Several variants of the meal exist, but most variants involve a sauce prepared with fried onions. Depending on the degree of caramelization the sauce can range from light brown to a deep black with a strong, pungent taste. The rice is often colored by cooking it with caramelized onion. The dish can be made with a variety of fishes, but usually firm, white fishes, such as haddock or cod are preferred. Entire fishes are used, and the fish head and bones are often used to produce stock and flavor the rice and the sauce. The dish is garnished with slivered almonds and toasted pine nuts, as well as fried onions.

== Regional Variations ==
=== Levant ===
Sayadieh is a common dish in the coastal cities of the Levant on the Mediterranean sea. It is often paired with Levantine tarator sauce.

In the coastal cities of Jaffa, Akka, and Haifa, sayyadiyeh is a "favorite" and is traditionally made by pan-frying whatever fish is caught in the day and plating it next to rice.

In the Gaza Strip, traditional sayadiyya is made using sea bass or guitarfish, but any white fish may be used. Some versions of Palestinian sayadieh are made into a "maqluba" by layering it with vegetables and onions then flipping upside down.

Sayadiya is also a staple dish in Aqaba, Jordan's only coastal city on the Red Sea. It is made from spiced rice and onions cooked in fish broth, and often served to guests or in special occasions.

=== Egypt ===
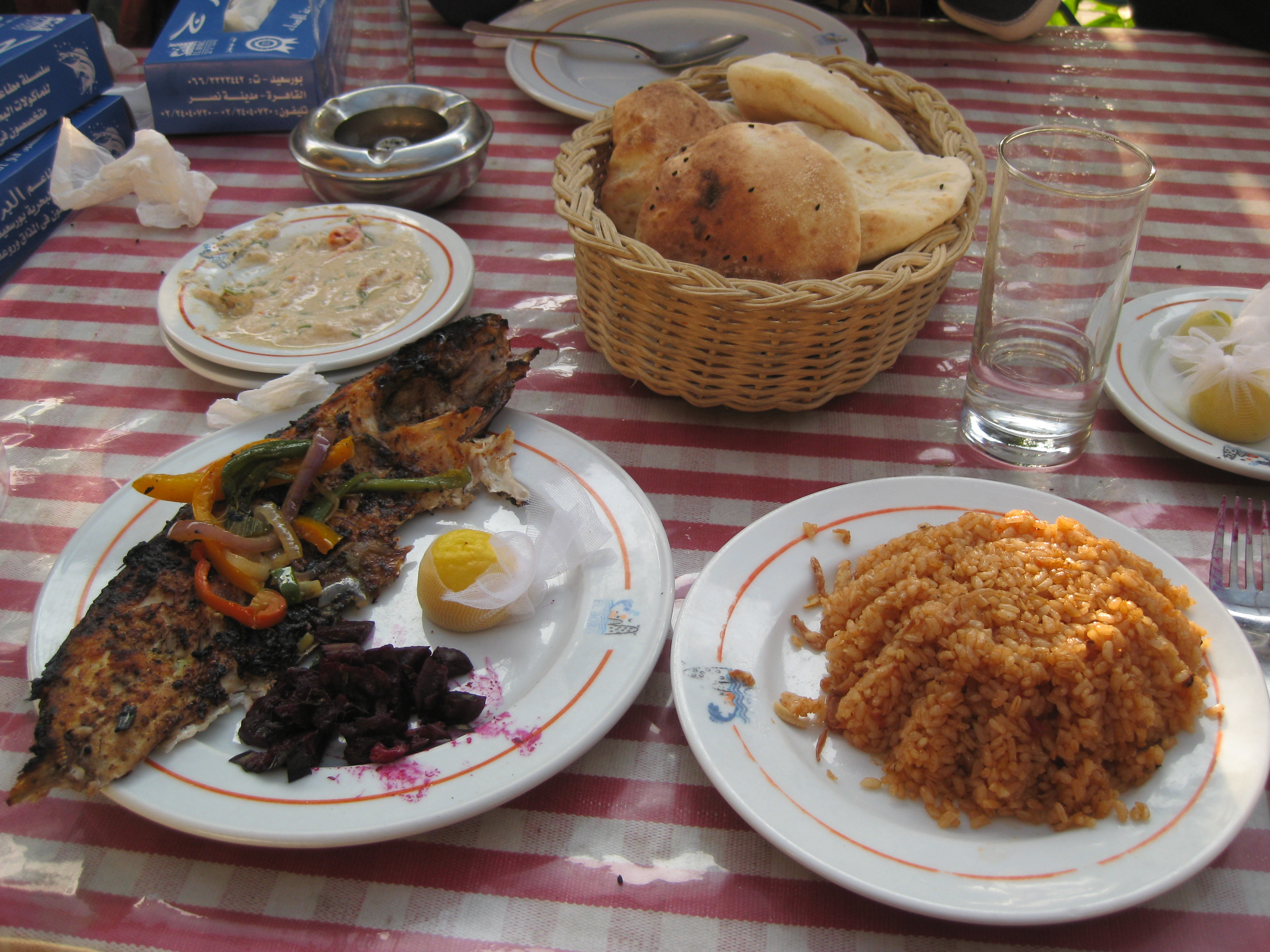
Egyptian sayadiya

In Egyptian cuisine, coastal cities like Alexandria and Port Said make variations of this dish as a fish chorba served next to rice.

Egyptian sayadiya is a dish comprising rice that usually accompanies fish, made with caramelized onions and aromatic spices. Sayadiya is a staple accompaniment to seafood dishes throughout Egypt, especially in coastal regions where fishing is integral to the local economy and culture.

The rice is typically Egyptian short-grain rice. It is mixed with caramellized onions and spices.

=== Saudi Arabia ===
Sayadieh is the regional dish of the city of Tabuk, it's made with caramelized onions and brown rice prepared in fish broth that are served with the fish.

== In popular culture ==
=== World Records ===
In 2019, the world record for largest serving of sayadieh was set in Jeddah, Saudi Arabia. According to Guinness World Records, it weighed over 600 kilograms and was set by Hussein Sallam.

== See also ==
- Mahmous
- Kabsa
- List of fish dishes
- List of rice dishes
- List of Middle Eastern dishes
- List of African dishes
