= Maryam's Bread =

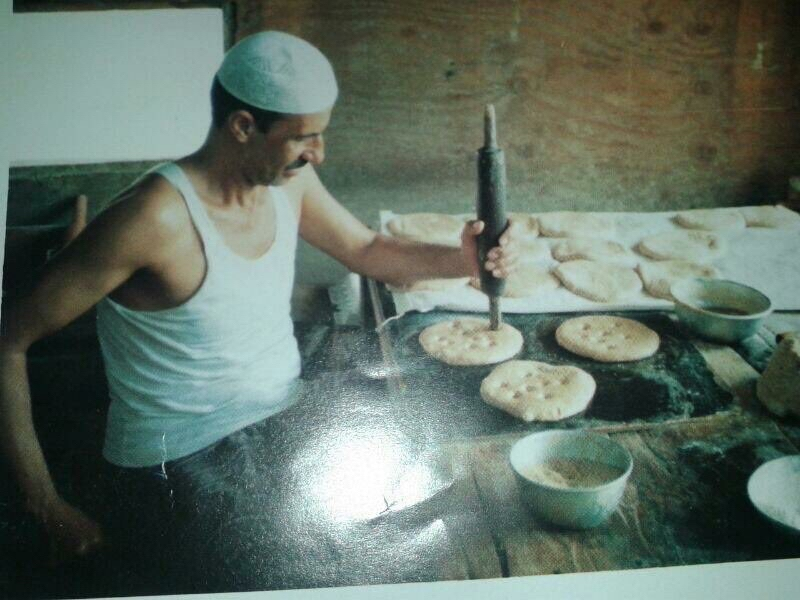
- Type: Flatbread
- Course: Side dish
- Place of origin: Qatif
- Associated cuisine: Arabian cuisine
- Serving temperature: Warm or at room temperature
- Main ingredients: Flour, Date molasses (or sugar), water
- Ingredients generally used: Egg wash, Sesame, cardamom, fennel, or other local spices
- Variations: Thick Bread (الخبز المتين), Red Bread (الخبز الأحمر), Date Molasses Bread (خبز الدبس), Al-Tahwira (التحويرة)

Maryam's Bread (Arabic: خبز مريم, lit. 'Mary's Bread'), also known as Yellow Bread (الخبز الأصفر) is a traditional Eastern Arabian flatbread originating from Qatif, Saudi Arabia. The bread is notable for its golden color, use of date molasses, and its cultural significance in both Islamic and pre-Islamic traditions. Though its exact historical evolution remains undocumented, historical scholars suggest its origins may trace back approximately 2,000 years to the Nestorian Christian era in Qatif, predating Islam.

== History ==
While the exact timeline of its development remains unclear, it is believed that Maryam's Bread may have originated during the Nestorian Christian period in Qatif, approximately 2,000 years ago. The tradition of its preparation has been preserved through generations of local families, particularly in Qatif.

== Etymology ==
The bread's primary name derives from the Virgin Mary (Maryam bint Imran in Arabic), reflecting local folklore that suggests she used to bake and consume this type of bread. The alternative name "Yellow Bread" refers to its distinctive golden color, achieved through the combination of eggs and date molasses in the recipe.

== Cultural and religious significance ==
The bread holds significant cultural importance in Qatif during the annual commemoration of Maryam bint Imran's death, observed on the 25th of Safar (Hijri calendar). The observance, which includes communal bread-making, is believed to have roots in pre-Islamic practices of the region's early Christian communities.

=== Local Traditions and Commemoration ===
The bread is traditionally prepared and distributed starting on the afternoon of the 24th of Safar, in preparation for the annual commemoration of the death of Maryam bint Imran on the 25th of Safar. Historically, the bread was not a standard commercial staple available daily in local markets; instead, it was prepared strictly by advance custom order ("Tawsiya") for specific religious occasions, sold at prices comparable to standard local bread. While primarily tied to the commemoration of the Virgin Mary, the bread's distinct dark, brownish-red hue also associates it with other periods of religious mourning. Local accounts note its frequent distribution during the first ten days of Ashura (the first ten days of Muharram) as well as the conclusion of these mourning assemblies ("Khatm al-Ashara").

== Preparation ==
The dough undergoes fermentation before being hand-shaped into circular discs. Prior to baking, the surface is brushed with egg wash and sprinkled with seeds. Traditionally, the bread is baked in a tannur, though modern adaptations may use conventional ovens.

=== Ingredients ===
- Basic ingredients: wheat flour, water, and yeast
- Sweetening agents: date molasses or whole dates
- Enriching ingredients: eggs, yogurt, and olive oil
- Toppings: sesame seeds and nigella seeds

=== Varieties ===
Local bakers distinguish between standard variations of the bread based on size, fermentation, and baking conditions. While both Maryam's Bread and the larger ''Khubz Matin'' utilize dates or date molasses as their core sweetening agent, their preparation methods differ significantly:

- Khubz Matin: Requires a prolonged fermentation and dough-proofing period. It is baked inside the tannur oven over a slow, gentle fire (low heat), requiring a longer baking duration to fully cook through its thicker structure.
- Maryam's Bread: Requires less time to mature and is baked rapidly inside the tannur under intense, high heat ("warm fire"), resulting in a shorter overall baking duration.

Traditionally, the dough relies entirely on date molasses (dibs), extracted locally from dates, as a natural sweetener and sugar substitute, which reacts with the flour and water to produce its signature brown-gold color. Authentic preparations incorporate a rich blend of traditional aromatic flavorings and spices, such as sesame, and the surface is brushed with a layer of egg wash prior to baking. In modern commercial adaptations, however, standard granulated sugar is frequently substituted for the traditional date molasses, and the specialized aromatic flavorings are often omitted.
