= Umm al-Sahik =

Umm al-Sahik أم الساهك
- Location within Saudi Arabia
- Coordinates: 26°32′30″N 49°59′12″E
- Country: Saudi Arabia
- Province: Eastern Province
- Governorate: Qatif Governorate
- Administrative authority: Safwa City

Population (2022)
  - Total: 15,378
- Time zone: UTC+03:00 (SAST)

Umm al-Sahik (Arabic:أم الساهك) is a town in the Qatif Governorate, located in the Eastern Province of Saudi Arabia.

== See also ==
- List of governorates of Saudi Arabia
- List of cities and towns in Saudi Arabia
