= Al-Khutt =

Older name of City used in pre-modern poetry as Figure of Speech

Al-Khutt (Arabic الخَطّ) is the older name for modern-day Qatif, Saudi Arabia.

The name survives today in pre-modern poetry, where the noun "Al-Khuttiyy" is used as kenning for "spear." It is believed that the region was well known for its spears, most probably made of spearheads imported from India, with which the region has always enjoyed strong trade and other cultural relations, and spear shafts made from bamboo canes, which were abundant in the region.

The name "Al-Khutt" also survives as the eponym of the family name "Al-Khutti" (spelled variously in English). Several prominent poets and scholars hold that family name, most recently the late Shaykh Abdulhameed Al-Khutti (1910–2001), the poet, Shi`i cleric, and judge at the Ja`fari Probate Court in Qatif, Saudi Arabia (1974–2001). Currently, his son, the famous hematologist-oncologist, Adel Al-Khutti, M.D., is the best known holder of that family name.
