= Mahmous =

Arabic rice dish

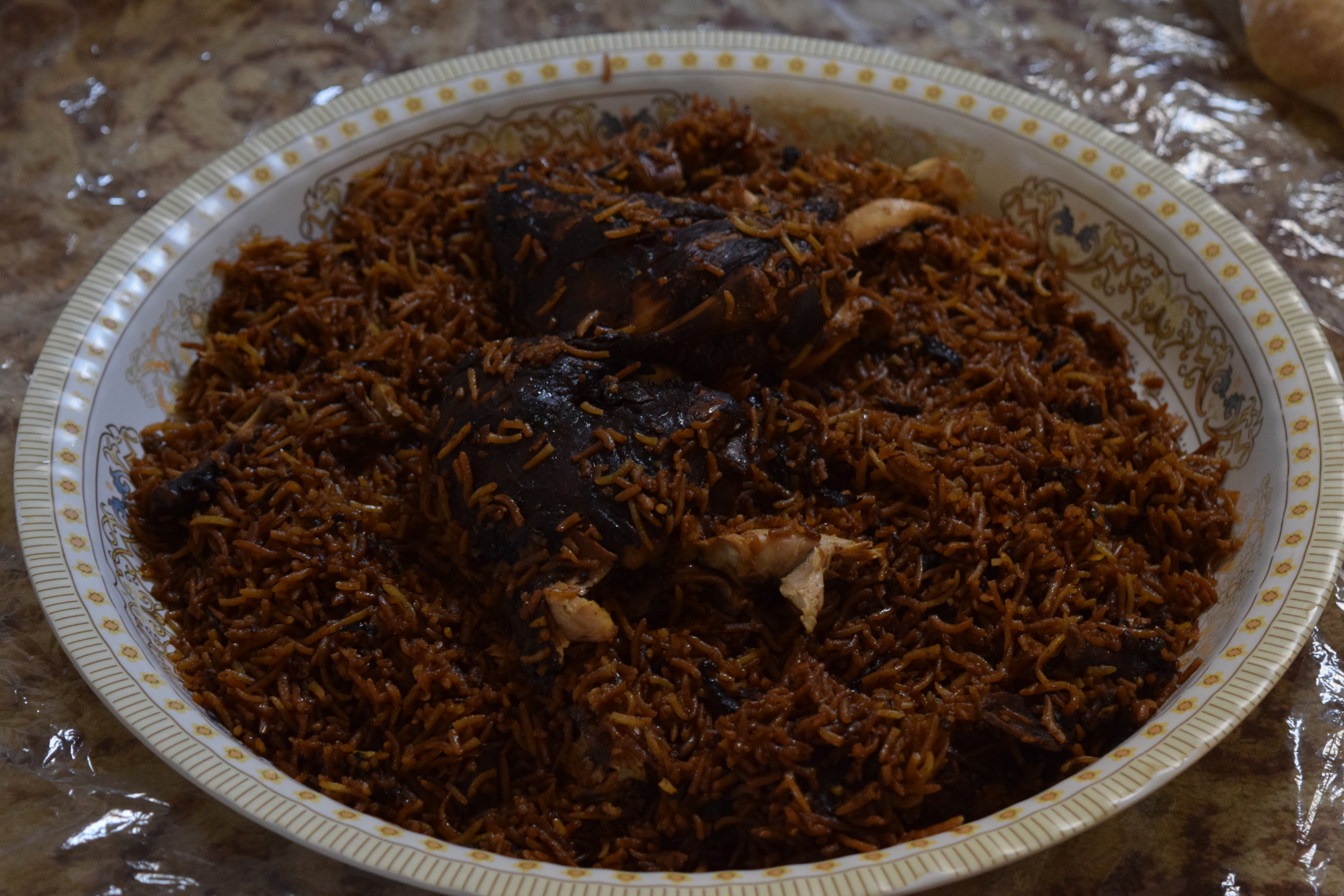
- Mahmous served with fried chicken wings
- Place of origin: Qatif
- Region or state: Qatif, al-Hasa, Bahrain
- Serving temperature: Hot
- Main ingredients: Rice, onion

Mahmous (Arabic: محموص) an Arabic rice dish popular in Qatif and al-Hasa regions in Saudi Arabia, and Bahrain regions. Its primary ingredients are rice and onion. The dish may have originated before the rise of oil in Saudi Arabia when the people in Qatif were too poor to offer such a dish with chicken, fish or meat so onion was used instead. And because of its black color and it can be prepared with relative ease with inexpensive ingredients, it is widely offered during Ashura to the audience to indicate a climate of grief during that period.

== Etymology ==
Mahmous, a contraction of tabkh al-hummous, comes from the Arabic word for roasting,in the case of this dish fried onion. The name comes from the red onions being sautéd to a caramelized blackened crisp at the bottom of an oiled pot before the addition of the meat and rice.

== History ==
The exact time or place where mahmous was first prepared is unknown, but popular opinion leans toward either Tarout Island or Qatif. Before the expansion of date palm cultivation drained the water table, the southern Persian Gulf shores were ideal for water-needy crops such as onions. The earliest documents indicate that the hussainiya (Shia ceremonial hall) owned by Sheikh Mansour al-Saif (1876-1943) on Tarout pioneered preparation. The family maintains the tradition of hosting holidays and funerals, though a task once shared between genders has become dominated by women who still roast on wood (often palm fronds) that has long since been replaced by gas the heat source itself.

== Origin ==
It is unclear why mahmous was originally created, though the following explanations have been proposed:

1. Some historians deny its tie to poverty in Tarout, instead emphasizing that the blackened roasting relates it to the color of Ashura, the only time the meal was traditionally made in Qatif.
2. Others point out that the people of Tarout were poor fishers without refrigeration and therefore could scarcely cook meat in a dish for the ten-day festival, requiring the then plentiful onions to substitute.

== Customs ==
=== Preparation ===
Mahmous is prepared after peeling the onions and the chickpeas, with the cooking starting each night after the sunset prayer so that is ready after the noon prayer the next day. Traditionally, preparation started two months before Muharram, during the month of Shawwal, when women villagers gathered to purify what was usually around 140 bags of rice. Some of the old customs continue in use today by some hosts, including roasting on firewood or palm fronds and placing the rice in palm-frond baskets (the weaving of which is known locally as Al-Khous).

=== Distribution ===
Both youth and the elderly together chop the onions, load dishes with mahmous for visitors, and distribute it to homes and passers-by in the streets, especially the poor. Packaging it for ceremonies of the mourning of Muharram or men and other destinations is quite common in Qatif towns. In general, mahmous cooking has transformed over time from an individual craft into a group volunteer tradition. The hosts provide supplies such as pots, utensils, and onion-peeling or meat and chicken-cutting machines in the squares and mosques near a hussainiya. Hosts often serve sides, including rice-flour qatayef (folded pancakes) and hot drinks such as coffee and tea with cinnamon sugar syrup or milk.

The locals in Qatif frequently contribute to the youth serving committees. Indeed, the Mansour Al-Saif Hussainiya is one of the oldest and most famous hosts in the region, serving around 800 dishes a day during Ashura in Tarout's Al-Deyrah neighborhood. Many prominent citizens of the region supervise mahmous preparation. For example, the Al-Ghawi of Qatif have made the dish for the Al Bahari neighborhood there since before 1980. People flock to the family house starting at six in the morning to help prepare the dish for afternoon distribution, often using the help of fifty women from the area in a section presided over by his wife while the men work in another portion of the mansion.

=== Relations between sects ===
The Sunnis of Zour, Darin, and Anak participate along with the Shiites of Tarout and Qatif, and sometimes the Tarout islanders send pots of mahmous to Zour and Darin where families await them each year. Bahrain also has a long history of Sunnis and Shiites settling in close proximity, and many Sunnis grew up in majority-Shiite areas in the cities of Manama and Muharraq. Therefore, it was common for Sunni families living near the husseiniyas to help prepare Ashura banquets.

== Proverb ==
A common proverb in Bahrain and Qatif goes as follows:

The one who offers condolences and consoles eats Hussein’s rice.
