= Safwa City =

City in Saudi Arabia

Coordinates: 26°39′N 49°57′E

Safwa صفوى
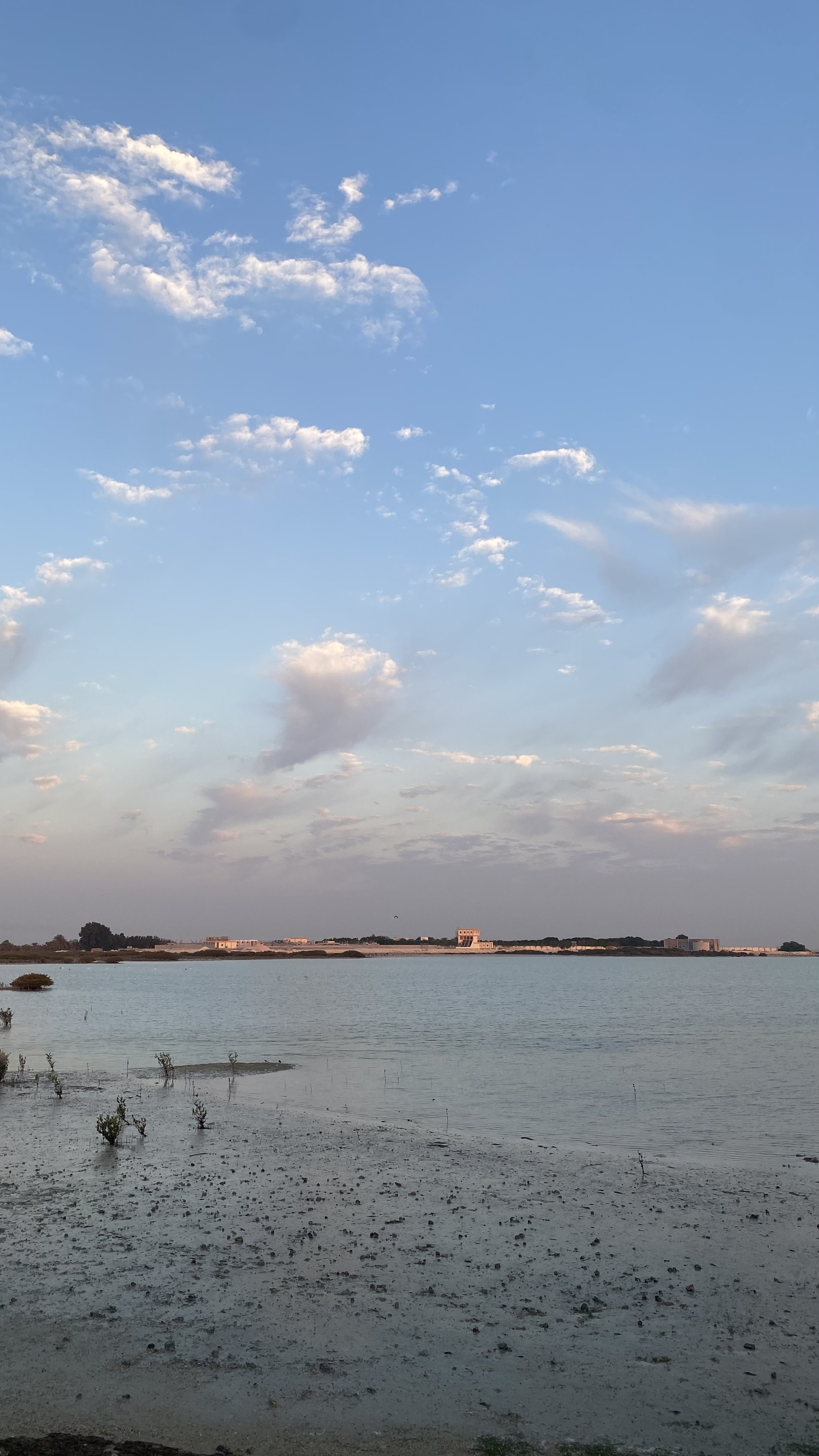
- Interactive map of Safwa
- Country: Saudi Arabia
- Province: Eastern Province
- Governorate: Qatif Governorate
- Region: Eastern Arabia

Government
  - Mayor: Sayed Hussein Al-Sada (as of 2022)

Population (2022)
  - Total: 45,676
- Time zone: UTC+03:00 (SAST)

Safwa City (Arabic: صفوى) is a city in the Qatif Governorate, located in the Eastern Province of Saudi Arabia.

== Overview ==
Safwa is home to several government departments, public utilities, educational institutions, and a healthcare center, including Safwa General Hospital. The city’s residents work across a variety of sectors, including education, healthcare, banking, mining, oil and gas, and commerce. One of its most well-organized areas is the Al-Zahra neighborhood (also known as Urouba), which is considered one of the top neighborhoods in the Eastern Province. It features more than 1,200 residential units and covers an area of 336 hectare.

== See also ==
- List of governorates of Saudi Arabia
- List of cities and towns in Saudi Arabia
