= Umm al-Hammam =

Village south of Qatif, Saudi Arabia

Coordinates: 26.54919°N 49.99617°E

Umm al-Hammam أم الحمام
- Location within Saudi Arabia
- Country: Saudi Arabia
- Province: Eastern Province
- Governorate: Qatif Governorate

Population (2022)
  - Total: 18,818
- Time zone: UTC+03:00 (SAST)

Umm al-Hammam (Arabic: أم الحمام) is a town in the Qatif Governorate, located in the Eastern Province of Saudi Arabia.

== Overview ==
The town lies approximately 3 kilometers east of the Persian Gulf coast. The majority of its residents are employed in the oil industry, agriculture, and fishing. Al-Quaa is located to the north, Al-Zawikiyah to the northeast, and Al-Jableh to the south.

== See also ==
- List of governorates of Saudi Arabia
- List of cities and towns in Saudi Arabia
