= Qatif =

Governorate and urban area in Eastern Province, Saudi Arabia

Qatif Governorate محافظة القطيف
- Governorate
- Location within Saudi Arabia
- Coordinates: 26.556°N 49.996°E
- Country: Saudi Arabia
- Province: Eastern Province
- Seat: Qatif City

Government
  - Type: Municipality
  - Body: Qatif Municipality
  - Governor: Ibrahim Al-Kharif

Area
  - Total: 481 km^{2} (186 sq mi)

Population (2022)
  - Total: 559,442
  - Density: 1,160/km^{2} (3,010/sq mi)
- Time zone: UTC+03:00 (SAST)
- Postal code: 31911
- Area code: 013

Qatif, (Note: Arabic: القطيف) historically known as Al-Khutt (Note: Arabic: الخط) and also referred to as Al-Qatif, is a governorate in the Eastern Province of Saudi Arabia. It covers an area of approximately 481 km². As of 2022, it had a population of 559,442. Its seat is Qatif City. It extends from Ras Tanura and Jubail in the north to Dammam in the south, and from the Persian Gulf in the east to King Fahd International Airport in the west.

Qatif is one of the oldest settlements in the Arabian Peninsula. Its history goes back to 3500 BC, more than 5,000 years ago, and it was a key part of Eastern Arabia, also known as Greater Bahrain. It was known to the Sumerians as Dilmun and according to the Epic of Ziusudra, is where King Ziusudra (the Sumerian Noah) came to dwell after the floodwaters receded and his boat came to rest.

Qatif, along with Al-Ahsa, are the historical core of the modern-day Eastern Province of Saudi Arabia. Both governorates are home to indigenous populations of Shia Muslims who have resided in the region for centuries. In contrast, cities such as Dammam and Khobar are relatively recent developments, established in the 20th century, with populations that largely migrated from Najd. Before the discovery of oil, Qatifi people used to work as merchants, farmers, and fishermen. However, with the development of the oil fields in the late 1940s, Qatif lost its status as an important port to Dammam, and since the 1990s has focused on the oil industry, public services, education, and healthcare sectors.

Several travelers visited the city, most famously Abulfeda, who wrote: "Al-Qatif: a town next to Al-Ahsa, of a beautiful nature, whose people are well-groomed, and it is on the Arab side of the Persian Sea coast." Ibn Battuta visited also, writing: "Then we traveled to the city of Al-Qatif, its name is derived from fruit picking, which is an oasis of water and a large city with many palm trees inhabited by sects of Shia Arabs."

Its survival in the midst of desert surroundings is due not only to its being a coastal city but to the fact that Qatif is a green oasis with rich agricultural soil. Qatif itself is surrounded by a jungle of palm trees. Springs are abundant in the oasis of Qatif. In the east lies the Persian Gulf, its warm and calm waters rich in marine life including fishes, shrimps, and pearl oysters. Also, some springs are found in the midst of its waters. In the west lies ad-Dahna Desert, its golden sands intermingled with little rocky heights. There are many landmarks in Qatif such as the old city of the Qala'a and Awamiya; Tarout Castle; Darin castle, which was built to repel the attacks of the Portuguese campaign on Bahrain in the 15th century; and traditional markets such as the Khamis market, in addition to statues, which were transferred to the National Museum in Riyadh to be preserved.

Qatif is home to Darin Airport, the first airport in Saudi Arabia, which opened in 1911. The airport was established by the Allied Powers during World War I as part of their military strategy against the Ottoman Empire, which then controlled much of the eastern Arabian Peninsula, including Qatif, Qatif later became part of the emerging Third Saudi state following the Conquest of al-Hasa in 1913. Qatif Municipality was established in 1926, making it the second oldest in the Kingdom after Jeddah Municipality.

== Etymology and history ==
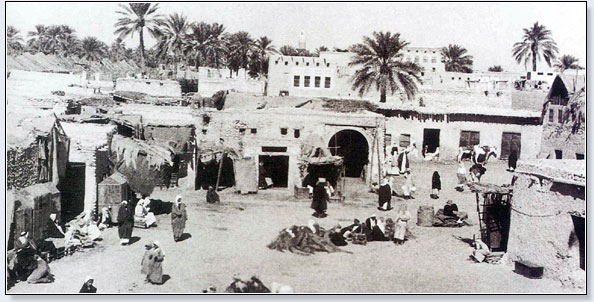
Historical Qatif Souq

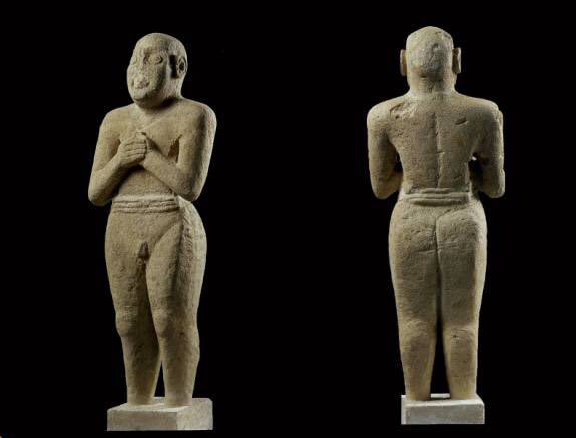
The statue of the Worshipping Servant (2500 BC) in a Praying Posture, carved from rough limestone from local stones, reaches a height of 94 cm. It is similar to the statues of Sumerian worshipers found in Mesopotamia. It was found by chance in 1966 on the island of Tarot while building a road to the archaeological hill and not in a regular excavation.

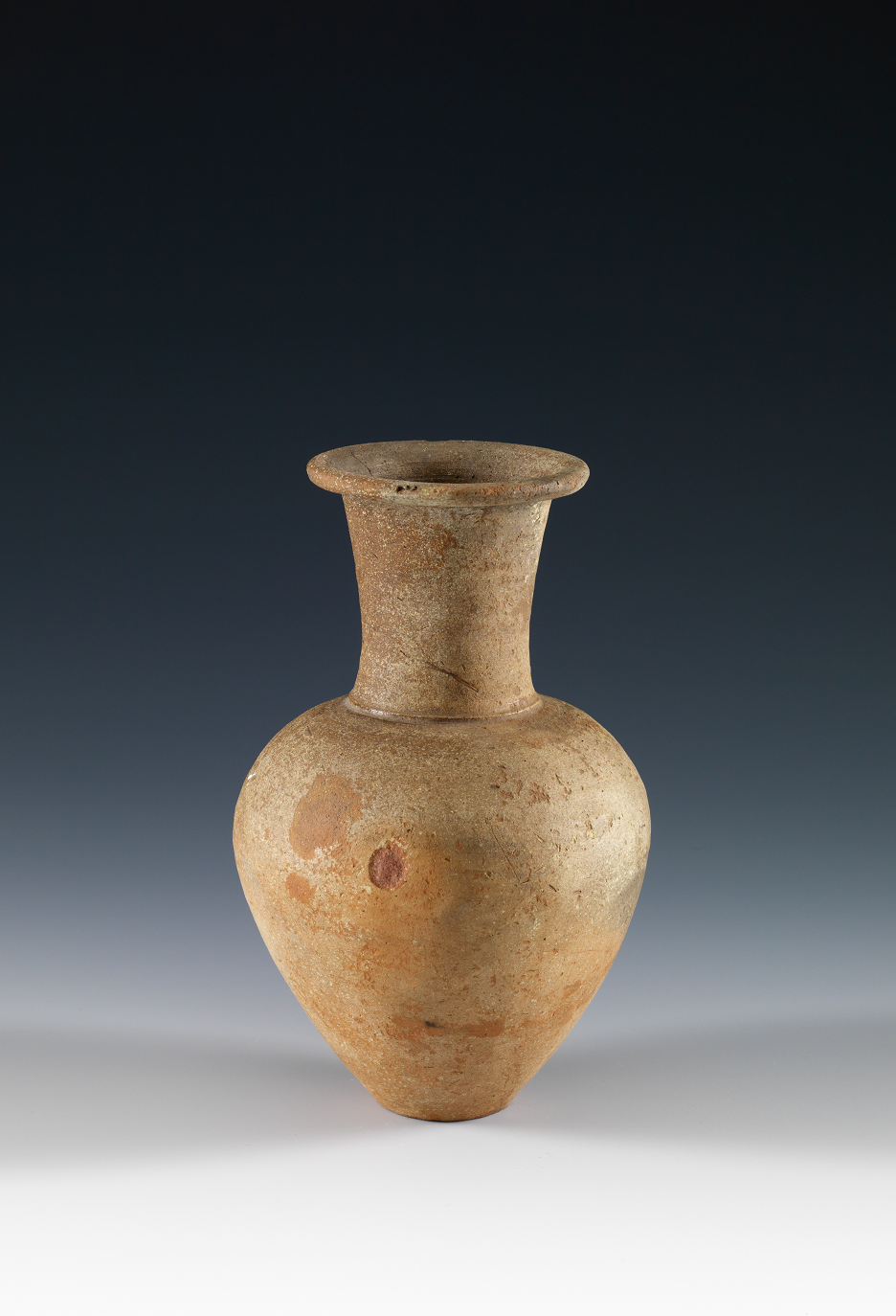
A pottery jar for preserving liquids is estimated to be from the third millennium BC. Found in the old castle in Qatif. It was found by chance while installing some devices for oil extraction nearby.

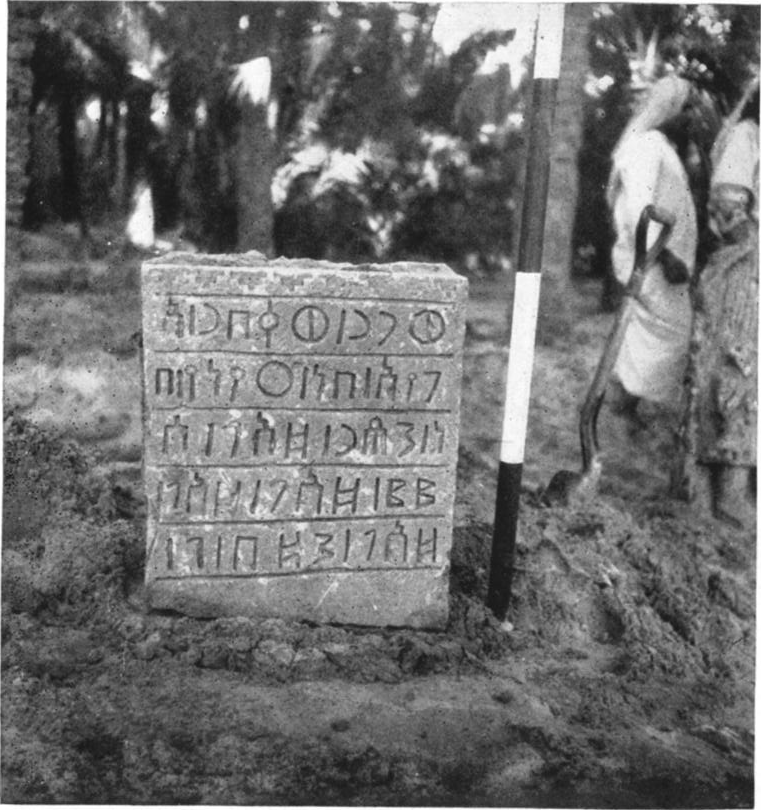
Ancient funerary inscription tablet written in Hasaitic, 5th-6th century CE. Tarout Island, Qatif.

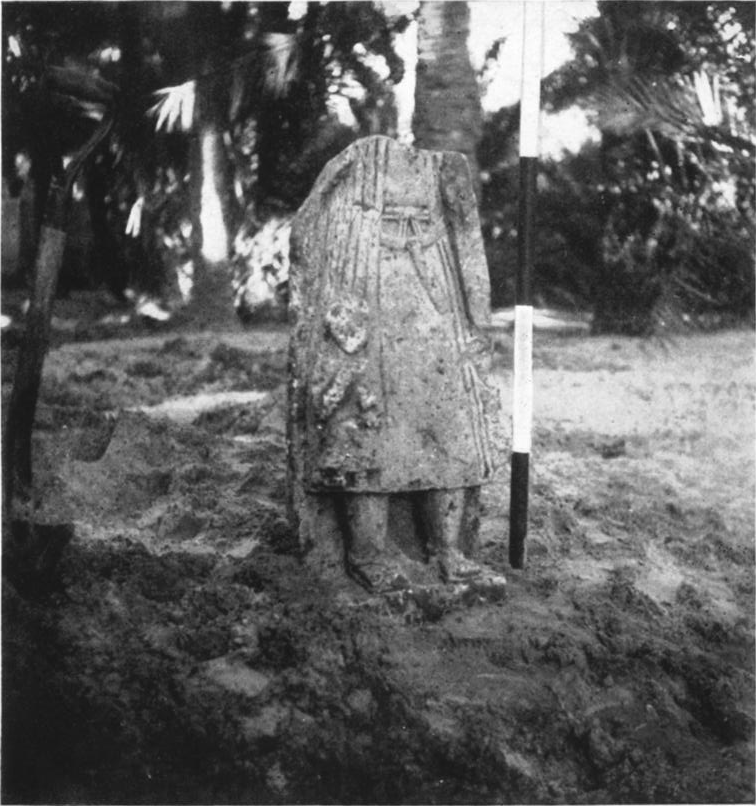
3-foot-tall limestone statue, missing its upper portion, unearthed on Tarut Island.

Qatif functioned for centuries as the most important trade port in Eastern Arabia, to the point where the whole Persian Gulf was labeled "Sea of Qatif". The term Qatif is derived from what translates to "harvest" or "grain", signifying the area's past agricultural history.

The historic oasis area shows its first archaeological evidence of settlement beginning about 3500 BC. It was known by other names, such as Al-Khatt (الخَطّ), immortalized in the poetry of Antarah ibn Shaddad, Tarafa ibn Al-`Abd, Bashshar ibn Burd (in his famous Ba'yya), and others. The word Khatty became the preferred kenning for "spear" in traditional poetic writing until the dawn of the modern era, supposedly because the region was famous for spear-making, just as muhannad ("of India") was the preferred kenning for "sword". The older name also survives as the eponym of several well-known local families ("Al-Khatti", spelled variously in English). Until the advent of Ottoman rule in the 18th century, Qatif belonged to the historical region known as the Province of Bahrain, along with Al-Hasa and the present-day Bahrain islands.

In 899 the Qarmatians conquered the region with the oases of Qatif and al-Hasa. They declared themselves independent and reigned from al-Mu'miniya near modern Hofuf until 1071. The Buyids of western Persia raided Qatif in 988. In 1059, Qatif was liberated from Qarmatian rule during the Battle of Qatif. From 1071 until 1253 the Uyunids ruled the region first from the city of "al-Hasa" (predecessor to modern Hofuf) and later from Qatif. In 1253 the Usfurids rose from al-Hasa and ruled during the struggle of Qays with the Hormuz for control of the coast. Probably at about this time, Qatif became the main port for the mainland surpassing 'Uqair in importance for the trade and thus became the capital of the Usfurids. Ibn Battuta, visited Qatif in 1331 and found it a large and prosperous city inhabited by Arab tribes whom he described as "extremist Shi`is". Power shifted in 1440 to the Jabrids of the Al-Hasa oasis.

=== Portuguese and Ottomans ===
In 1515 the Portuguese conquered Hormuz. They sacked Qatif in 1520, killing the Jabrid ruler Muqrin ibn Zamil. They invaded the island of Bahrain and stayed there for the next eighty years. The ruler of Basra extended his power to Qatif in 1524 but ultimately in 1549 the Ottomans took over, though they could not expel the Portuguese from the island of Bahrain. In 1551 the Portuguese conquered Qatif, maintaining domain of the Gulf allied with the Pasha of Basra.

In 1680 the Al Humayd of the Banu Khalid took the by-now weak garrison of the Ottomans in Hofuf. In a battle at Ghuraymil, south of Qatif, the Banu Khalid lost their rule to the new "First Saudi State" in 1790. In 1818 the Saudi State was destroyed in the Ottoman-Saudi War and the commander of the mostly Egyptian troops, Ibrahim Pasha, took control of Hofuf, only to evacuate it the next year and return to the west coast. The Humayd regained control until the Banu Khalid were finally defeated in 1830 by the "Second Saudi State" who now took control of the whole region. The Ottomans moved in again in 1871 not to be expelled until 1913 when Ibn Saud finally established the Saudi rule in the Eastern Province.

=== Modern political history ===
The economy of Qatif witnessed a sharp decline in the 1920s, initially due to the invention of cultured pearls which severely impacted the Gulf pearl trade, then due to World War I. The decline was accelerated by a special "Jihad" tax imposed by the Saudis (then the Sultanate of Nejd), which was used to fund military campaigns. The economic situation became so dire that many citizens were imprisoned for unpaid taxes, including several wealthy landowners and merchants. Then in 1929, the tax was doubled. Riots broke out in several towns, and a large group escaped to Bahrain and requested protection from the British consul. The governor of Qatif responded with intimidation and mass imprisonments. Several notables wrote letters to King Abdulaziz voicing their complaints. He eventually met with the governor and some citizens, pardoned past-due taxes, and reduced new taxes.

Approximately 60,000 Shias (estimate of 1969) live in the oasis town of Qatif, which is about 65 km (40 mi) from the main Saudi refinery and the export terminal of Ras Tanura. The Shias have participated in all the strikes and other political demonstrations that have taken place in the kingdom. The most significant were the 1979 strikes when the Saudi armed forces were called in. The Shias in Saudi Arabia were very receptive to Khomeini and demonstrated against the Saudi royal family on the hitherto novel grounds that Islam and hereditary kingship are not compatible. When American jets landed in Dhahran Air Base for manoeuvres, citizens of Qatif organized a big demonstration. The demonstrators spent the evening of 11 November 1979 shouting slogans against the royal family and the Americans. The Saudi government responded by imposing a curfew on all the towns in the Qatif area, sealing off the area with tanks and armoured vehicles. A bloody showdown between the armed forces and the Shiites continued until 30 November 1979, in which thousands were arrested, hundreds injured and 24 killed.

On 10 March 2011, in the wake of the Arab Spring and a day before a "day of rage" planned by Saudi internet users, consisting of protests across Saudi Arabia; 'dozens' of Shias attended a rally in the city centre calling for political reforms in the kingdom and the release of prisoners allegedly held without charge for more than 16 years. The government declared protests to be illegal and it had previously warned against this action. Police opened fire on the protestors, injuring three, and there were reports of stun grenades being used as well as many more injuries from police use of batons. Further protests in Qatif continued throughout 2011. Over six people were reported to be killed by the government's forces since November 2011. The government tried to overshadow the reports but social networking groups has highly worked to demonstrate the way the government used force against the protesters In early January 2012, Riyadh ordered the arrest of 23 people responsible for unrest in the Eastern Province. Activists reported that seven protesters were killed from November 2011 to 10 February 2012 in Qatif.

The march on 10 February 2012 was reportedly organised to protest against the killings of demonstrators who were calling for reforms, an end to sectarian discrimination, and the release of political prisoners. "While security men were following up on an illegal gathering in the town of al Awamiya in Qatif on Friday they were attacked by gunfire," said a police statement published by the state news agency, Saudi Press Agency (SPA). Zuhair al Said was killed on 10 February 2012 when police opened fire to disperse protesters in the town of al Awamiya, in the Qatif region. About 500 people had been arrested since March 2011. Activists said 80 remained in custody, including author Nazir al Majid and human rights activist Fadil al Munasif. In July 2012, the government arrested Nimr al-Nimr, a Shiite preacher who called for protests against the government. The arrest of such an icon in the city of Qatif resulted in protests the evening of his arrest. Government snipers killed two protesters that night: Sayed Akbar al-Shakori and Sayed Mohammed Alfelfel. Videos of the killing were released on video streaming sites such as YouTube.

Another unrest occurred between 2017 and 2020.

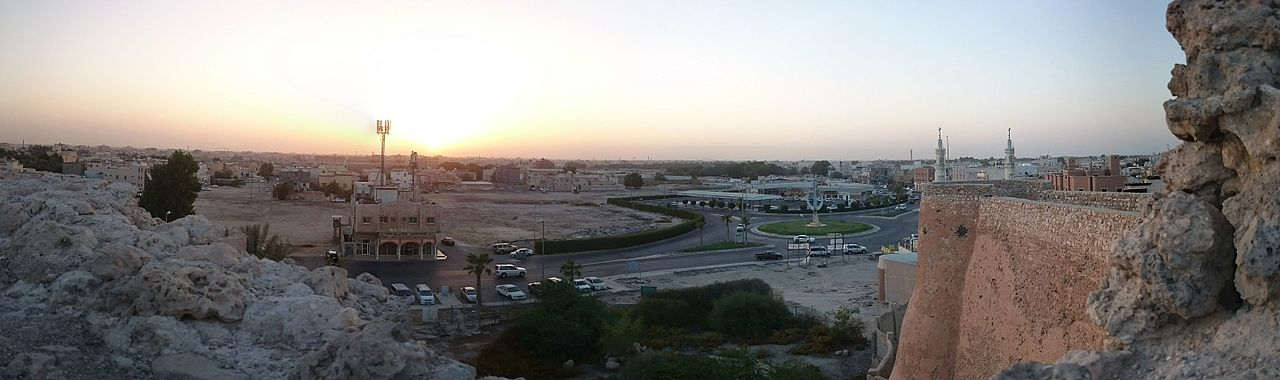
Panorama of Tarout old village on top of Tarout's castle.

=== Political Transitions in Qatif ===
Qatif’s strategic location on the Persian Gulf made it a key center for trade and culture, attracting various empires and regional powers. From the 2nd to the 20th century, this played a significant role in shaping its rich and complex history.

Year	Event	Description
224	Sasanian Empire	Qatif was part of the Sasanian Empire for several centuries.
638	Rashidun Caliphate Takes Control	Qatif comes under the control of the Rashidun Caliphate during the Muslim conquest of Eastern Arabia under Caliph Umar ibn al-Khattab.
661	Umayyad Caliphate Rule	Qatif is governed under the Umayyad Caliphate following the assassination of Caliph Ali.
750	Abbasid Caliphate Rule	The Abbasids overthrow the Umayyads and maintain nominal control over Eastern Arabia, including Qatif, through appointed governors.
899	Qarmatians State	Qatif is incorporated into the Qarmatian state, a radical Ismaili Shi’a movement, serving as a base for Gulf trade.
1076	Uyunid Emirate	Qatif becomes part of the Uyunid Emirate, a local Arab dynasty, following Qarmatian decline.
1253	Usfurids Takes Control	The Usfurid dynasty rises to power, seizing Qatif and Eastern Arabia after Uyunid weakening.
1310	Jarwanid Dynasty	The Jarwanid dynasty, a Shi’a power, establishes Qatif as its capital after Usfurid decline.
1417	Jabrids Takes Control	The Jabrids, a Bedouin dynasty, gain control of Qatif and much of eastern and central Arabia, excluding Hejaz, parts of Oman, and Yemen.
c.1520	Portuguese Empire Sacks Qatif	Portuguese forces sack Qatif, disrupting trade and exerting temporary influence over Gulf routes via Strait of Hormuz.
1549	Ottoman Empire Takes Control	The Ottoman Empire captures Qatif, integrating it into their Gulf territories.
1559	Ottoman Siege of Bahrain	Ottomans, based in Qatif, attempt to seize Portuguese-held Bahrain but fail.
1560	Lahsa Eyalet Established	Qatif becomes a sanjak in the Ottoman Lahsa Eyalet.
1680	Bani Khalid Emirate Takes Control	The Bani Khalid tribe, allied with local forces, ousts the Ottomans, establishing rule over Qatif.
1790	First Saudi state Takes Control	The First Saudi State defeats the Bani Khalid, seizing Qatif in their Wahhabi expansion.
1818	Ottoman Egypt Occupation	Ottoman forces, led by Ibrahim Pasha, briefly occupy Qatif during the Ottoman-Saudi War.
1819	Bani Khalid Regains Influence	The Bani Khalid tribe briefly regains influence in Qatif after Ottoman-Egyptian withdrawal.
1830	Second Saudi state Takes Control	The Second Saudi State regains Qatif from the Bani Khalid.
1871	Ottoman Empire Retakes Control	The Ottomans reclaim Qatif and Al-Hasa, countering British influence.
1913	Emirate of Nejd and Hasa Takes Control	Ibn Saud captures Qatif, incorporating it into the modern Saudi state, formalized in 1932.

== Administrative divisions ==
Area	Population (2022)
Major Cities
Qatif City	87,332
Saihat	84,818
Safwa	45,676
Towns and Villages
Al-Awamiyah	26,276
Al-Qudaih	22,492
Al-Jish	22,343
Al-Jaroudiya	20,986
Anak (Qatif)	20,038
Umm al-Hammam	18,818
Al-Awjam	16,147
Umm al-Sahik	15,378
An-Nabiya	13,018
Al-Taubi	8,801
Hillat Muheish	7,287
Al-Khowaildia	6,578
Al-Mallaha	5,544
Other small villages total	19,264
Islands
Tarout Island	117,646
Qatif Fish Island	Uninhabited fish market island
Total Population	559,442

== Tourism and historical sites ==
Qatif offers a rich cultural and historical experience for visitors. It is known for its vast agricultural areas, particularly its abundant palm groves and diverse vegetation. The region's deep-rooted heritage is reflected in the architecture of its old villages, such as Al-Awamia, Al-Qudaih, and Al-Qala'a, shaped by centuries of different civilizations. Tourists can also enjoy traditional festivals held throughout the year, including Aldoukhala and Eid celebrations. Qatif is home to vibrant traditional markets, with the most notable being the weekly Thursday Market (Suq) ("Suq Al-khamees") and "Suq Waqif." An Esplanade along its shore adds to its charm as a coastal destination.

However, many of Qatif's historical sites have been lost over time due to a lack of preservation efforts or demolition for government-led urban development projects.

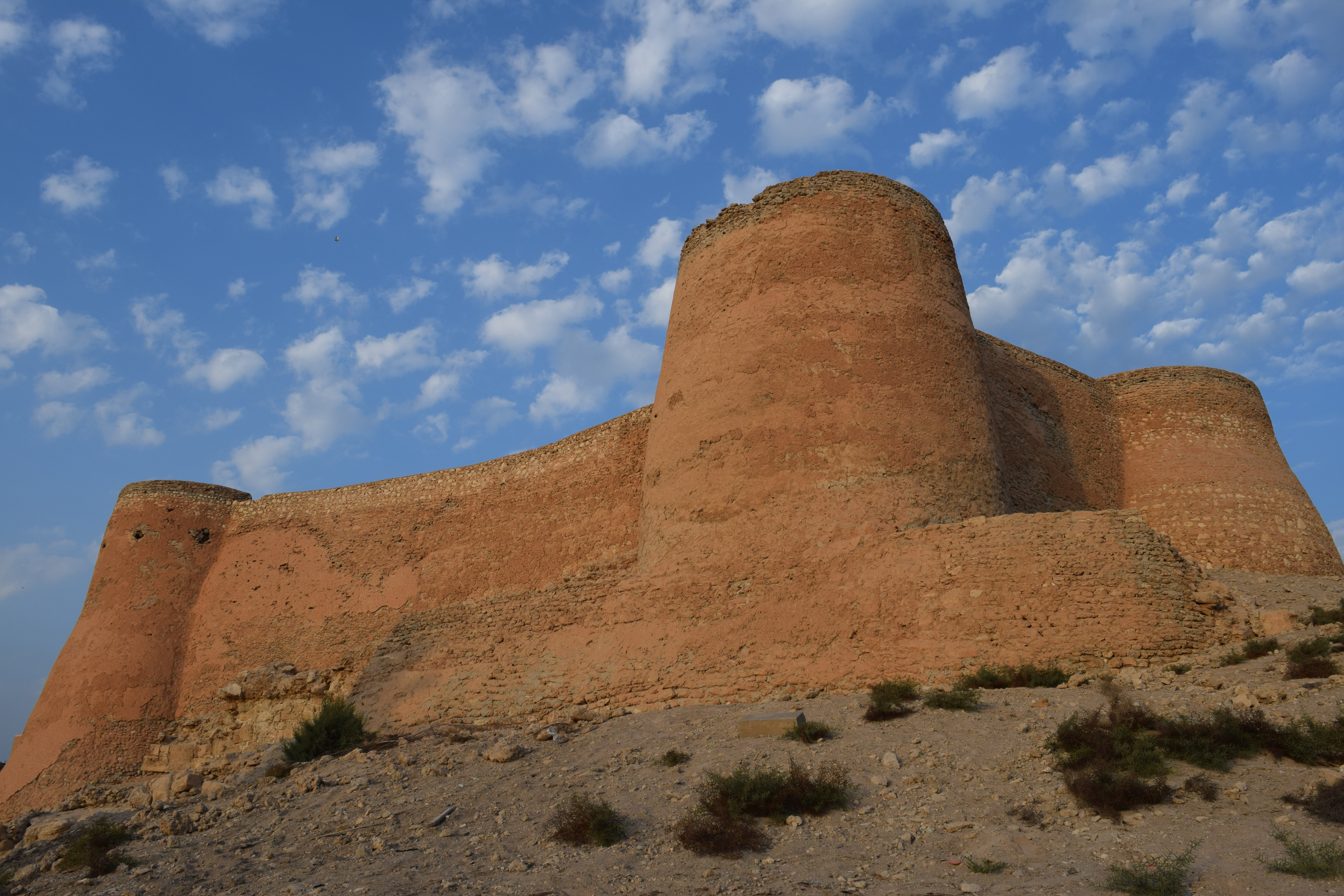
Tarout Castle

Tarout Castle sits on a hill called Tall Tawt in the center of Tarout Island, in eastern Saudi Arabia. The hill is about 5,000 years old, and the castle dates back to the Uyuni state, later used by the Portuguese for defense.

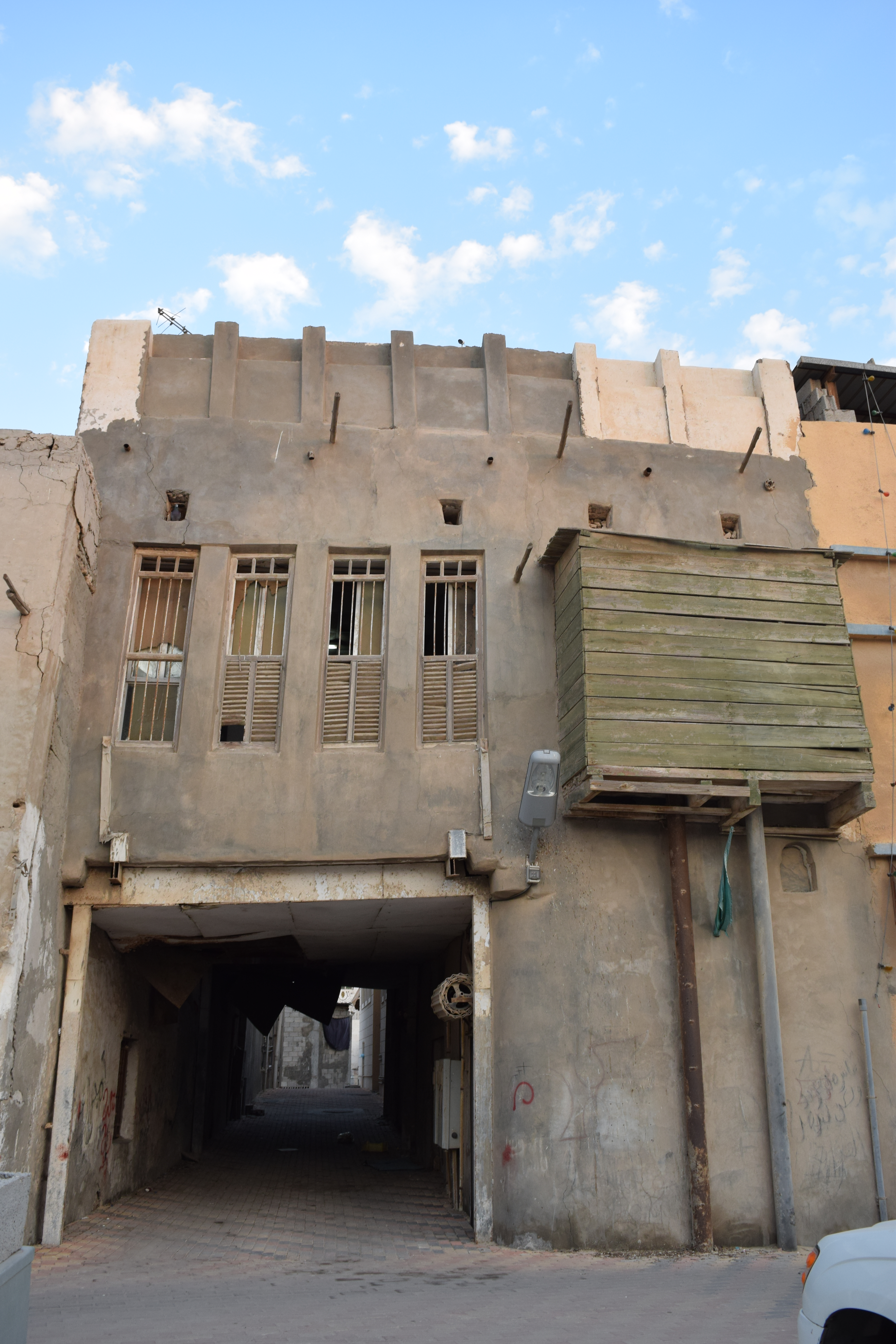
Tarout old village.

Tarout Old Village is a historic area with narrow alleys, traditional houses, and ancient architecture. It reflects the deep cultural heritage of Tarout Island.

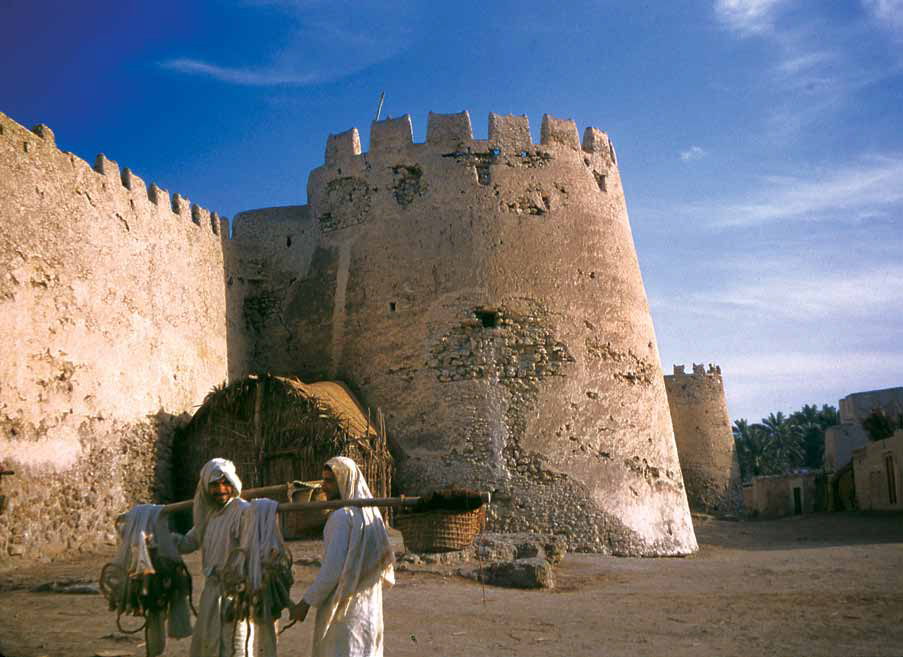
The qatif Castle or Qal'at al-Qatif in the 1940s

Qatif ancient castle Qal'at al-Qatif, also known as Hadaret Qatif and Al-Farda, was an ancient fortress located in the center of Qatif, Saudi Arabia. Built by the Sassanids in the 3rd century CE, it was later restored by the Ottoman Empire in the 17th century as a military base. Over time, it also served as a warehouse and residential area. The castle was demolished by the government in the 1980s, leading to the loss of one of the region’s most significant historical landmarks.

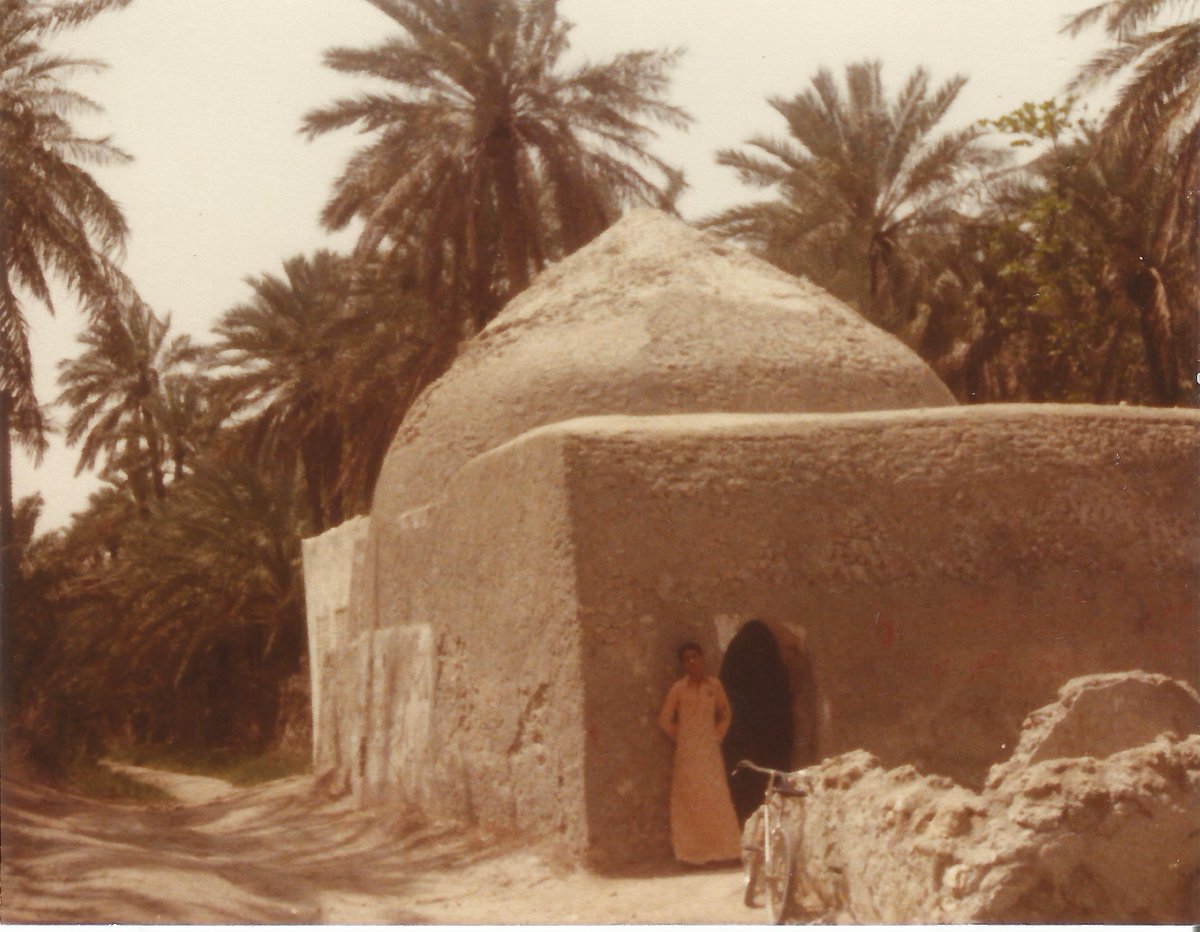
Abu Loza's Bath

Abu Loza's Bath is a historic hammam (bathhouse) located in Al-Bahari village, known for its mineral-rich sulfur water. Built near the Eye of Abu Loza, it was traditionally used for treating skin and joint ailments.

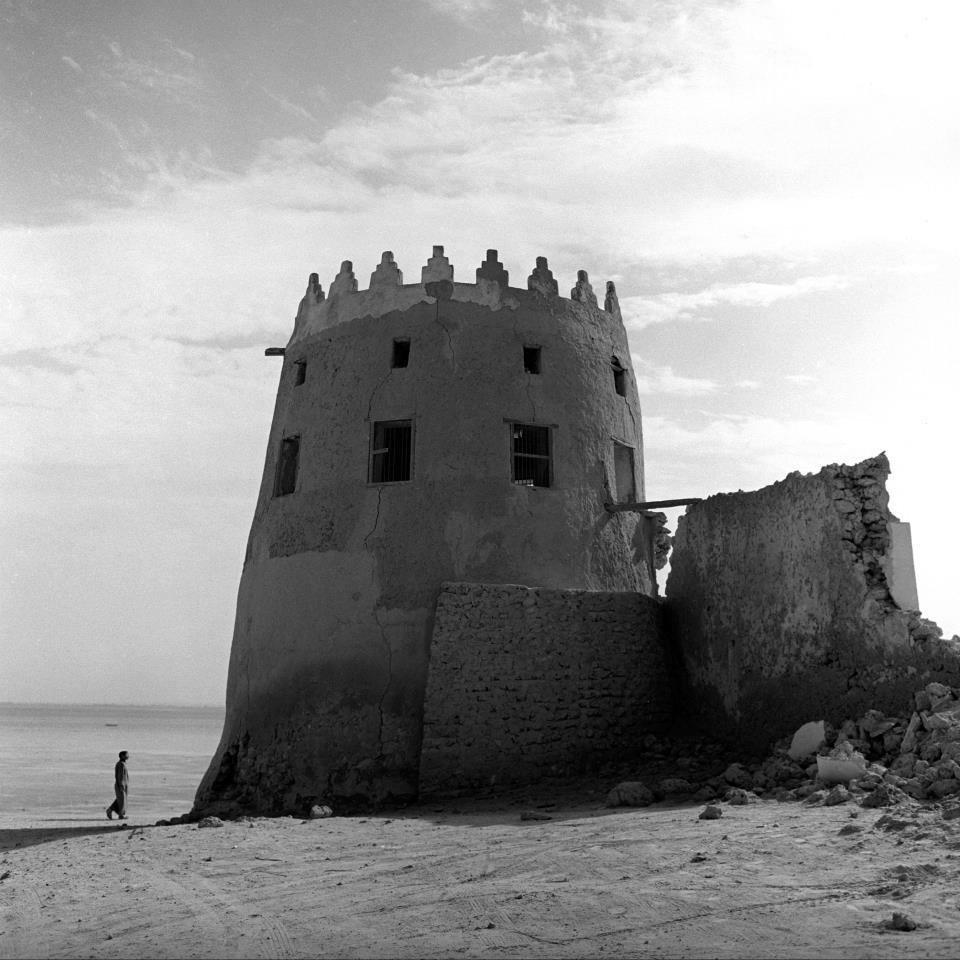
Al-Faihani Palace

Al-Faihani Palace, located in the village of Darin on Tarout Island in Qatif, once stood beside the historic Darin Castle. Restored in 1884–1885 by Muhammad bin Abdul Wahhab Al-Faihani, the palace is now destroyed.

== Cuisine ==
Although Qatif shares many traditional Arab dishes with its neighboring regions, it is particularly known for and specializes in several unique local delicacies. In fact, Qatif is the birthplace of three distinctive dishes that originated there.

- Maryam's Bread
- Mahmous
- Qatifi Kabaji

== Climate ==
Qatif Governorate has a hot, dry continental climate characterized by high humidity in the summer and cold winters. Temperatures range between 5°C and 44°C (40°F to 110°F). Heat begins to rise in April, peaks in August, and starts to decline in September. The cold season typically extends from November through March.

The governorate is only a few feet above sea level, and its coastline experiences two tidal cycles daily. During low tide, the water may recede significantly from the shore, while high tide peaks twice a month—at the beginning and middle of the lunar month—reaching the coastal areas. In spring, tidal waters can rise up to 1.8 meters and retreat as far as one kilometer from the shore in some locations. Due to this, Qatif’s shores are unsuitable for docking boats with a draft exceeding six feet, as they are unable to access the inner harbor.

As a coastal governorate directly overlooking the Persian Gulf, Qatif experiences very high humidity. Humidity begins increasing in July and reaches its peak in August, ranging between 90% and 96%, and remains relatively high until late February or sometimes into March. Wind direction significantly influences humidity levels: moisture-laden Kaws winds from the east or south (the Persian Gulf and Indian Ocean) raise humidity, while winds from the desert lower it. Northern and western desert winds reduce both temperature and humidity in the summer and contribute to colder, sand-laden air in the winter.

Seasonal Bawareh winds blow between May and June, bringing dust and affecting the growth of date palms. The Dabour winds, which blow from the desert at night and continue into the morning, are dry and help cool the air. At the end of winter or during spring, irregular Bakkaa winds—locally named—blow unpredictably and often disrupt marine navigation.

Winter temperatures typically range from 5°C to 25°C, though they may occasionally drop to 0°C. Rainfall occurs sporadically during winter, spring, and autumn, primarily between early November and April, usually as showers averaging no more than 6.3 cm. Rain is rare in summer. Annual precipitation has decreased in recent years, not exceeding 84 mm, while annual evaporation reaches around 3,000 mm. Rainfall timing affects agricultural output, and while hail may occur, it is extremely rare.

== Demographics ==
The Qatif region is the largest concentration of Shia Islam in Saudi Arabia and Qatif is the centre of the Shia population in Saudi Arabia.

As of 2022, the total population of Qatif was 552,442. Qatif has one of the lowest numbers of non-Saudi residents in the kingdom (only 114,173).

Most people in Qatif are Arab Baharna who are the original inhabited of the region, with very similar culture and dialects to the Baharna of Bahrain. There is a minority of bedouins, of the tribes of Bani Khalid and Bani Hajer, concentrated in Anak and Umm al-Sahik. There are also Sunni Gulf Arabs concentrated in Darin and Al-Zour.

== Culture ==
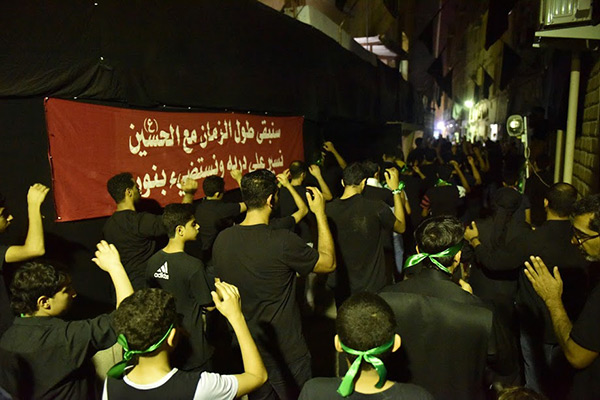
Husseini rituals during Ashura in Qatif.

Several periodic religious occasions are held in Qatif, the most prominent of which are the Eid al-Fitr and Eid al-Adha, as well as Qarqi'an, and the deaths and births of Muhammad and Twelve Imams.

At the beginning of each Hijri year, Qatif is draped with black, red and green banners and flags over houses, alleys and roads, which is intended to announce the state of mourning and the start of the Ashura season from the beginning of the month of Muharram until the end of the month of Safar in commemoration of the days of Ashura in which Hussein bin Ali, grandson of Muhammad was killed in the Battle of Karbala. These days have a special importance for the majority of the Qatif community, in which shops are closed and no marriages take place, and any sign of joy is abolished, and black or dark colors are worn. These days are accompanied by Hussaini Majlises which are religious or scientific lectures delivered by clerics in Husayniyyas or mosques. And the practice of Husseini rites. During the 10 days, small kiosks are erected by volunteers in the squares and streets to provide free food, sweets and beverages to the audience and passers-by. Mahmous, a local black colored dish is widely offered during Ashura to indicate a climate of grief.

Traditionally, people go out to the seashore to celebrate after the end of Safar, and when they return in the sunset, heaps of straw are collected and burned to symbolize the burning of mourning monuments. Pottery, worn-out trays, and pots are disposed of by smashing them, a habit that seemed to fade away, but few still do it nonetheless. Joy and festivals pervade all of Qatif on during Qarqi'an, on the 15th of the month of Sha’ban, which coincides with the birth of Al-Mahdi, and this day is called Al-Nasifah, and on the 15th of Ramadan, which coincides with the birth of Hassan bin Ali, and is called Karikshon. Qarqi'an is an annual custom found in both Bahrain, Qatif and some other areas in the Persian Gulf, where celebrations are held, feasts are made, new clothes are worn, candles are lit, and people and children between 4 and 12 years go out to the streets of old villages and neighborhoods to celebrate. Mosques prepare early to receive visitors, and people distribute sweets and food. The girls wear traditional clothes and are decorated with henna. The children chant folk songs, while they roam the neighborhoods with large bags to collect candy distributed from houses.

== Sports ==
Almost every city and town in the governorate has its own sports club, with Handball and football being the most popular sports. The three biggest clubs are based in the three major cities, and the governorate's main sports hub is the Prince Nayef Sports City Stadium. Plans to build a new stadium, Al-Khaleej Stadium, were also announced.

- Qatif City: Al-Taraji
- Safwa City: Al-Safa
- Saihat City: Al-Khaleej
- Al-Qudaih: Mudhar
- Al-Awamia: Al-Salam
- Tarout Island: Al-Huda
- Anak: Al-Sahel

Notable football players from qatif:

- Hassan Al-Raheb
- Ali Lajami
- Mohammed Al-Fatil
- Hussain Al-Turki
- Abdullah Al-Salem

== Economy ==
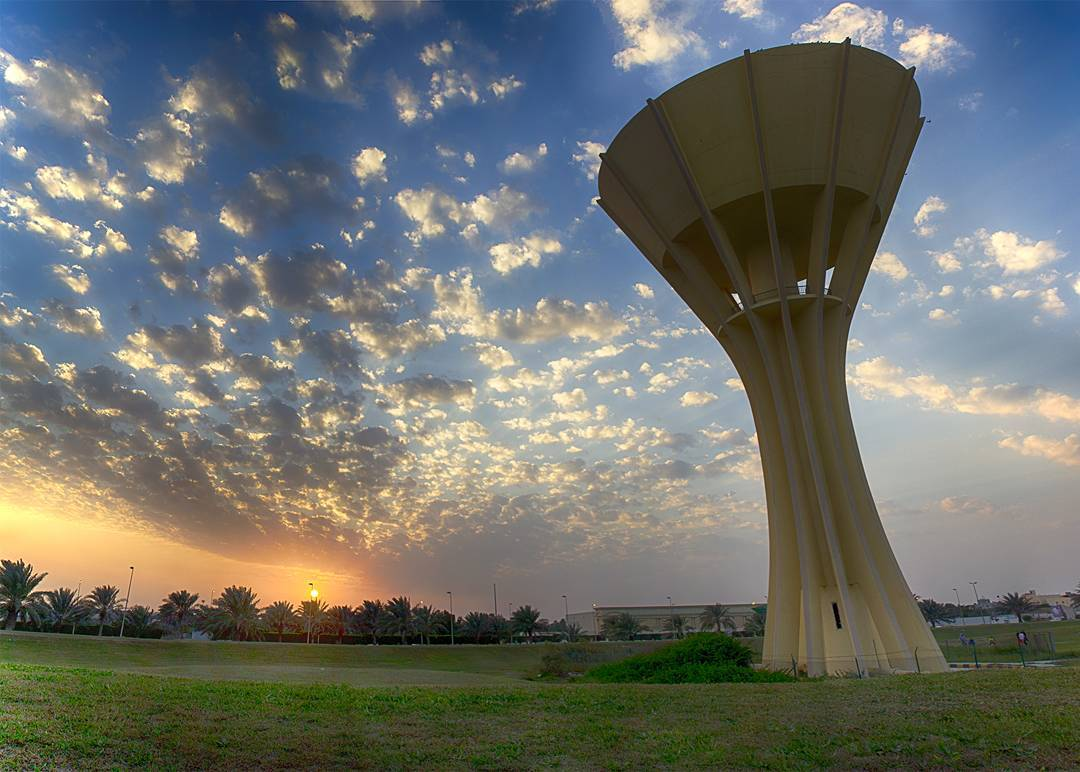
Water tower

Saudi Aramco (the Saudi national oil company) completed the development of the Qatif Project in October 2004, comprising facilities to produce, process and transport 80,000 cubic metres per day (500,000 bbl/d) of blended Arabian light crude oil from the Qatif field and 48,000 m^{3}/d (300,000 bbl/d) of Arabian medium crude oil from the offshore Abu Sa'fah field (total 130,000 m^{3}/d (800,000 bbl/d)), plus 10 million cubic metres per day (370×10^{6} cu ft/d) of associated gas.

Qatifi people are likely to work in the oil industry (Saudi Aramco, Schlumberger, Halliburton and Baker Hughes). Some of the employees have moved to Dhahran, where these companies are located, but the majority still reside in Qatif and go to Dhahran by cars or Saudi Aramco buses in about 50 minutes' journey. Others work in Aramco refineries in Ras Tanura. and others work in the petrochemical companies in Jubail (80 km from Qatif), some go every day and some have moved to Jubail. SABIC is the largest employer in Qatif, However, some Qatifi are also working in other oil, petrochemical, and engineering companies located in Dhahran, Khobar, Dammam, Ras Tanura, or Jubail. Some of Qatifi people work in public services, health care and education.

The Qatif coastline is rich with shrimp and many varieties of fish. Qatif Fish Market is the largest in the Middle East. Qatif villages are known to have many date palms and other fruits.

On 8 March 2020 Qatif was put into lockdown by Saudi Arabia until 29 April 2020 because of cases of COVID-19.

== Education ==
Qatif is home to several educational facilities built by the government, ranging from elementary to secondary schools. While most are public, there are also some private institutions. Kindergarten programs are available, with each town offering at least one government-funded kindergarten through local charity associations, although most kindergartens are privately owned. Additionally, Qatif has a male College of Technology, offering higher education opportunities. Every town has schools for both males and females, covering primary through secondary levels.

However, Qatif still lacks a university, which significantly limits local access to comprehensive higher education. As a result, many students are forced to travel not just to nearby cities, but even to distant ones such as Riyadh, Jeddah, or other regions across the Kingdom to pursue university degrees.

This is particularly noteworthy considering that Qatif consistently produces some of the highest-performing students in the Kingdom. The region is known for its academic excellence, with many students achieving top ranks nationally, making the absence of a university a missed opportunity to further support and retain local talent.

== Transport ==
=== Air ===
Air travel is provided by King Fahd International Airport, the distance from the terminal to the governorate center is 30 km (19 mi).

=== Roads ===
Qatif is connected with other Saudi urban centers through highways mainly the Highway 613 which runs across Qatif, and Highway 95 which serves as a western border for Qatif and separates it from King Fahd International Airport. The Gulf Road links the city with Dammam.

It is also close to the King Fahd Causeway that connects the kingdom with Bahrain (about 55 km (35 mi)).

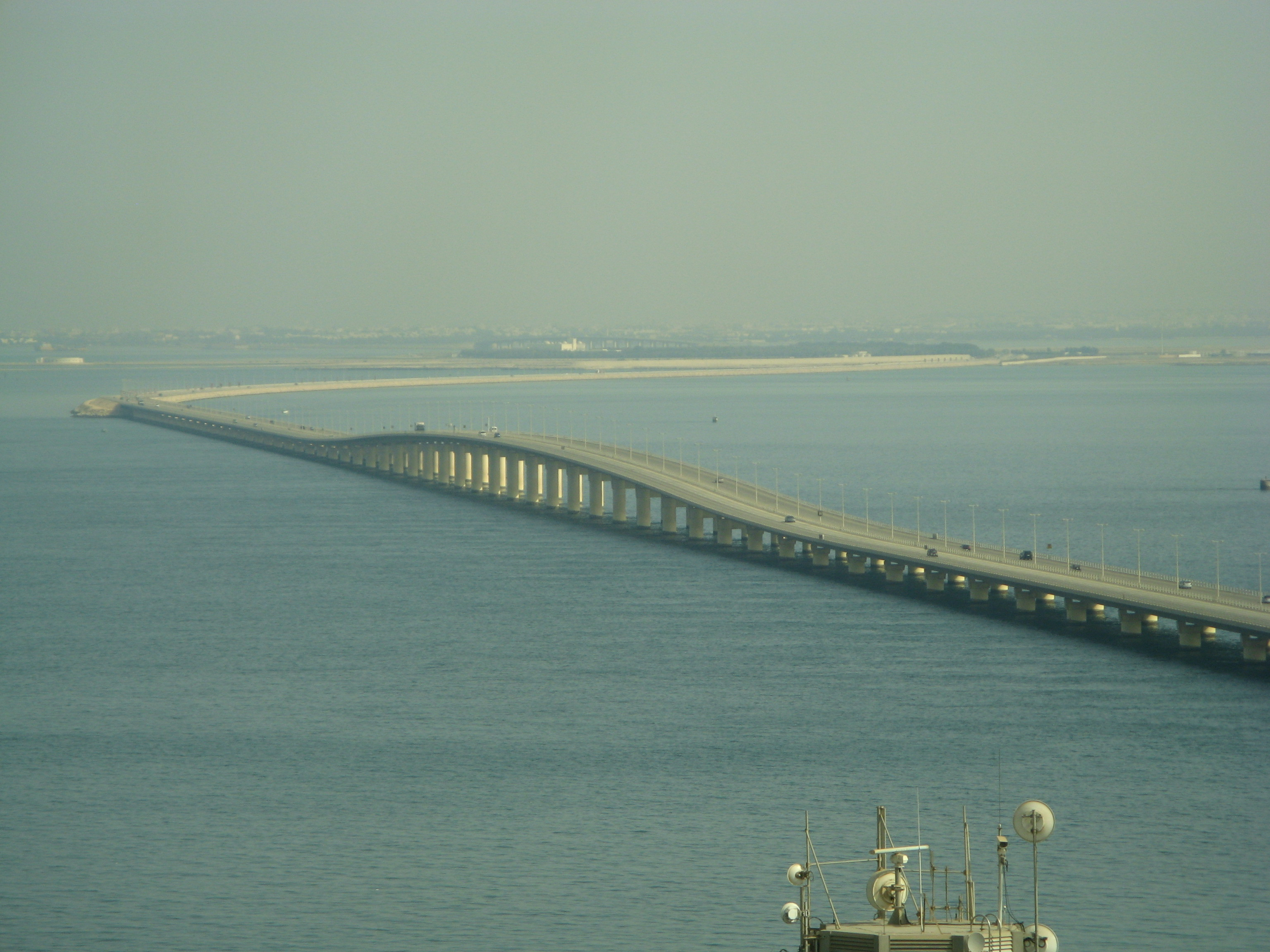
King Fahd Causeway

=== Buses ===
The bus rapid transit (BRT) system, launched in 2023, provides transportation within some parts of Qatif and connects to neighboring cities like Dhahran, Dammam, and Khobar. The network spans 453 kilometers and includes 212 bus stops across all the cities.

== Notable people ==
- Amin H. Nasser – President and CEO of Saudi Aramco
- Hasan al-Saffar – Shi'ite jurist
- Nadhmi Al-Nasr – Former CEO of Neom
- Nimr Baqir al-Nimr – Shi'ite jurist

== Gallery ==
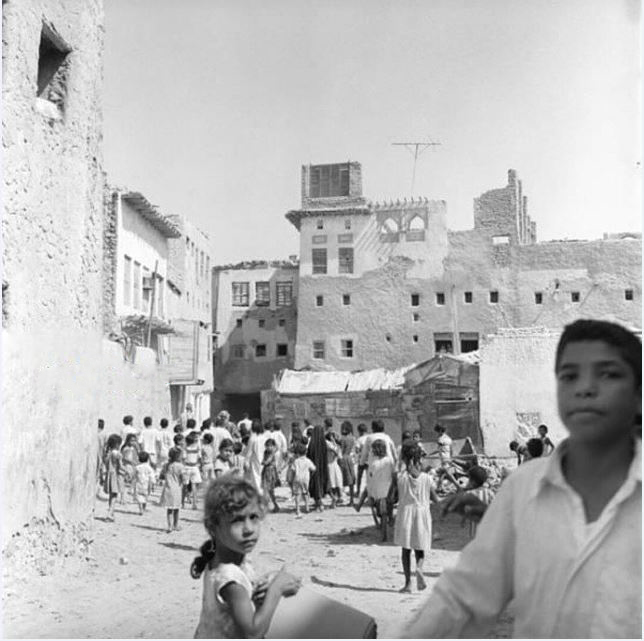
Qatif Castle neighborhood, 1972 – a glimpse into the historic heart of the city

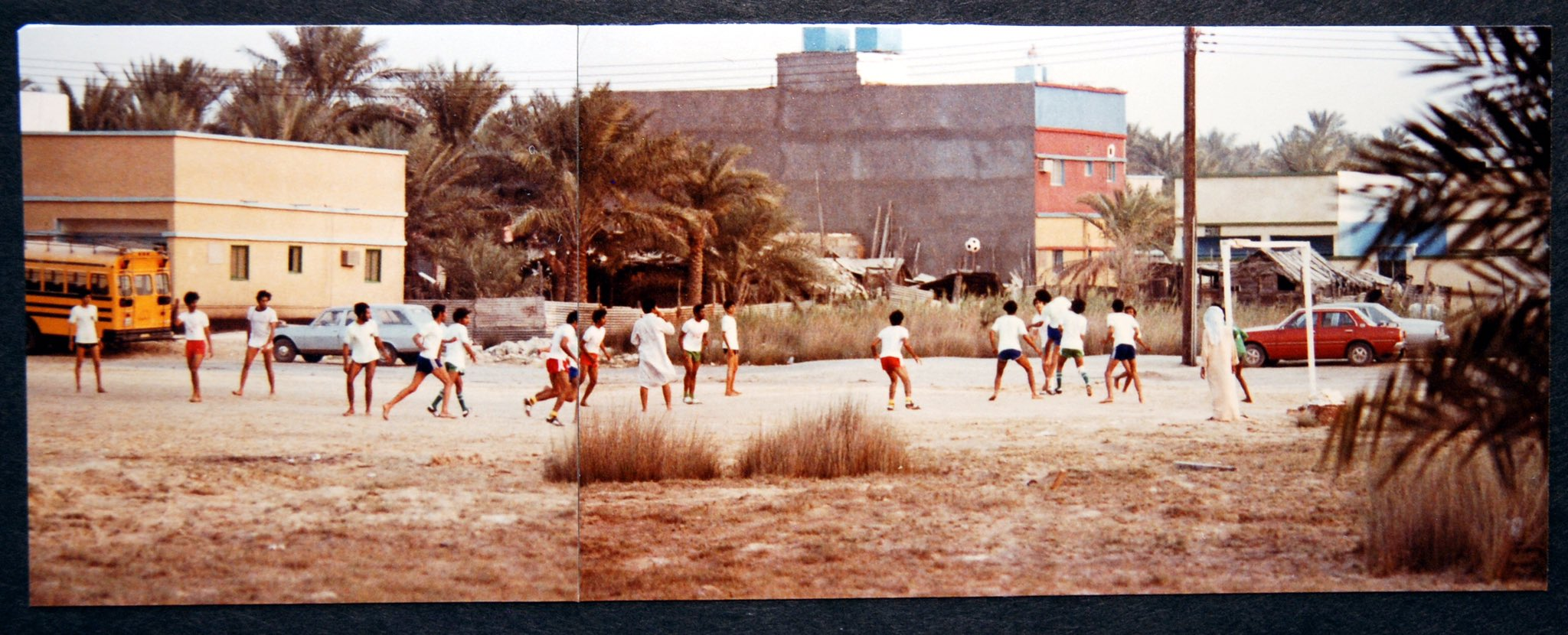
Local youth enjoying a football match, Qatif, 1978

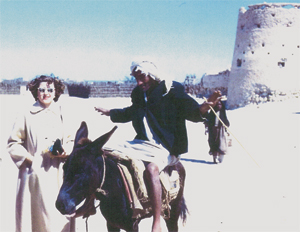
A tourist visits Qatif Castle as a local strikes a playful pose, 1953

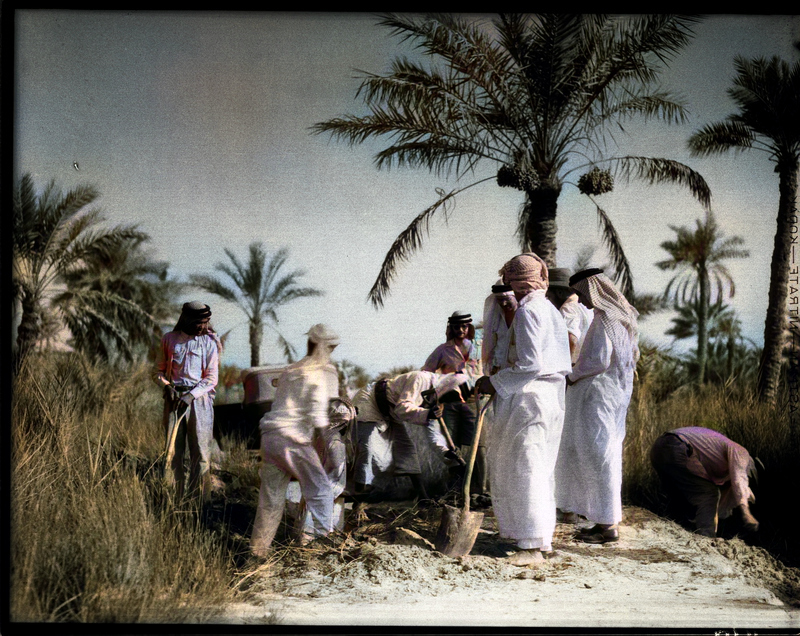
Qatifi farmers at work, 1935 – a window into agricultural life

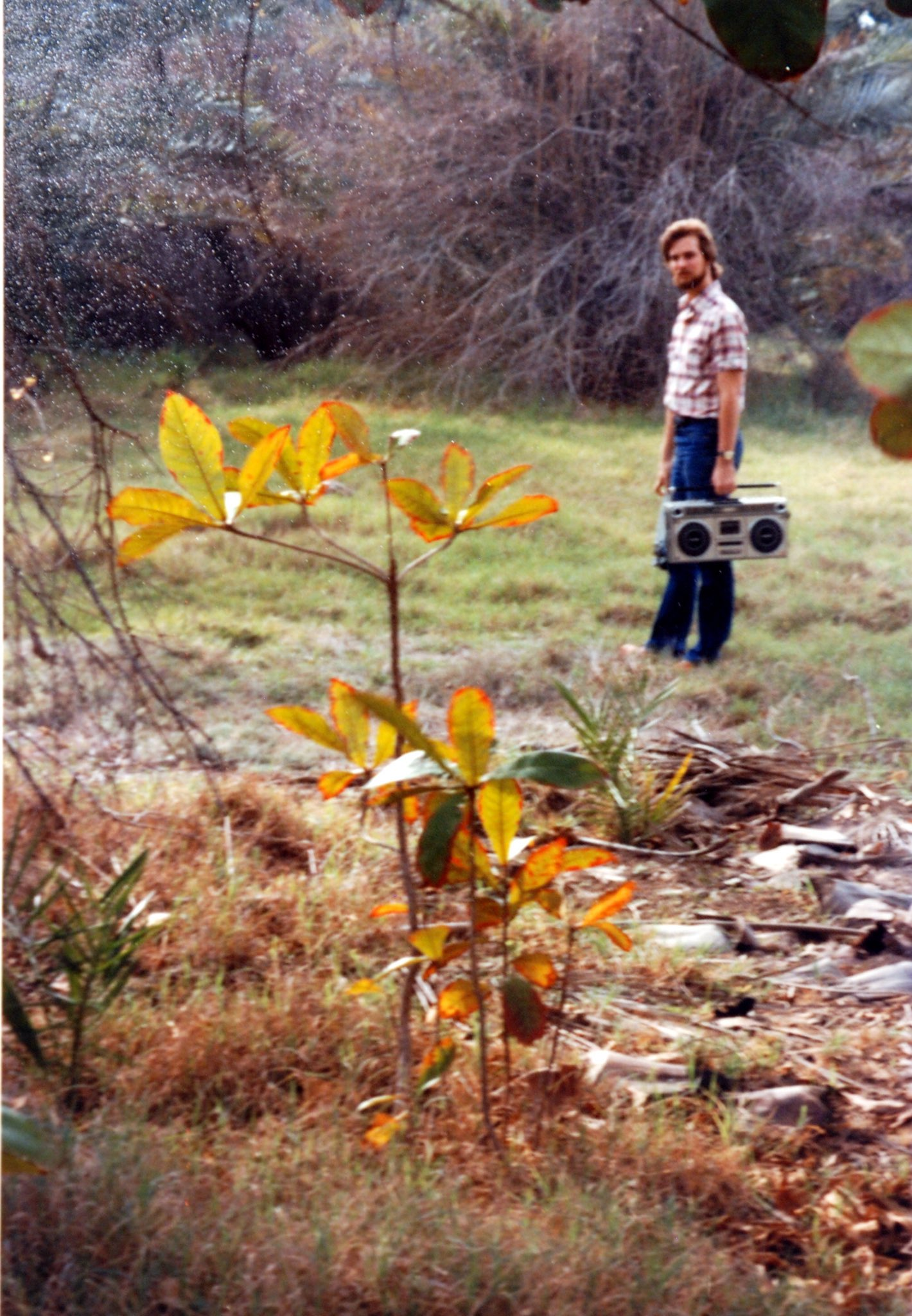
A quiet moment on a Qatif farm, 1978

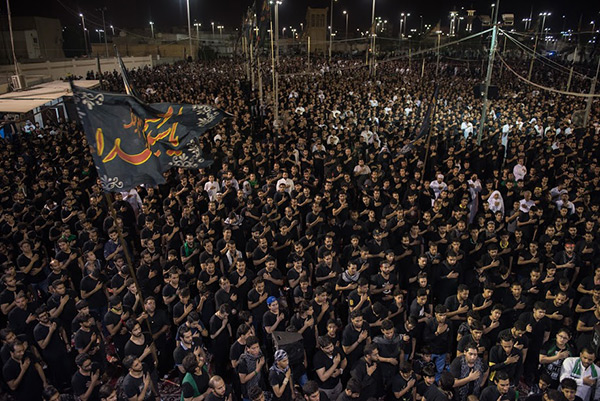
Ashura procession in Qatif – a deep-rooted cultural and religious tradition

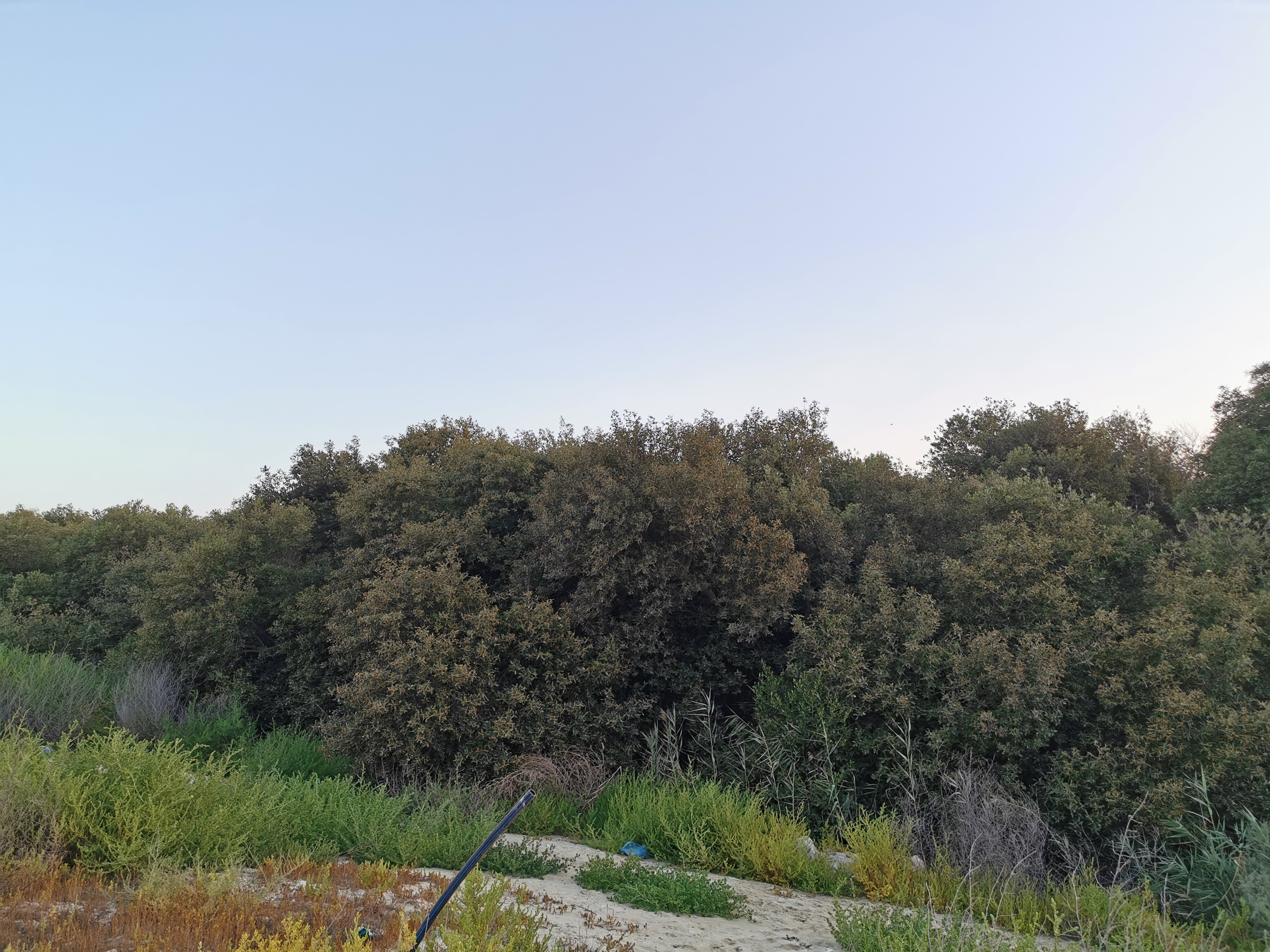
Thriving mangroves in Qatif’s coastal ecosystem, 2020

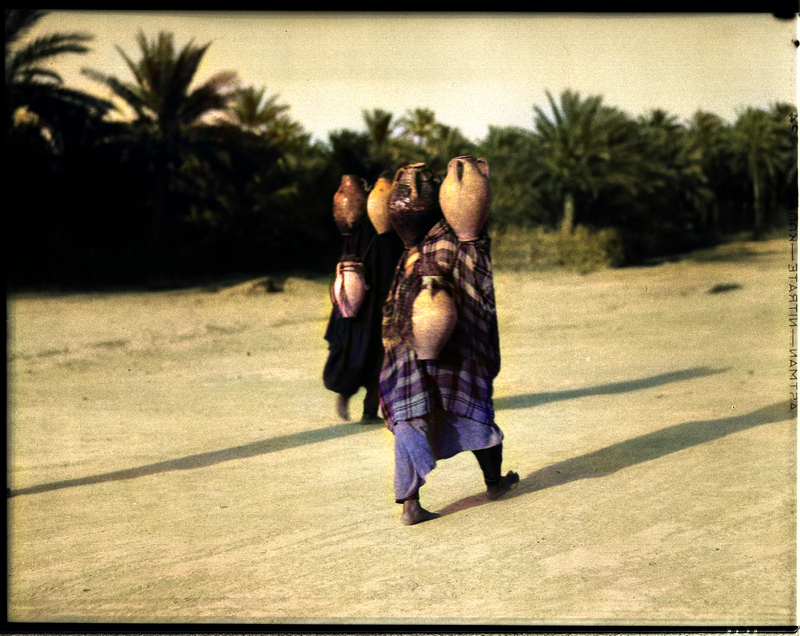
Qatifi women on their way to tend farms, 1935

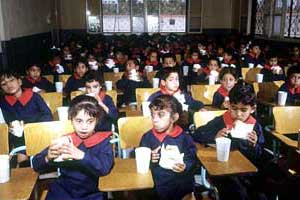
Children gathered at a school in Saihat, 1972

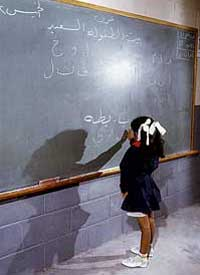
A young girl at school in Saihat, 1972 – a snapshot of early education

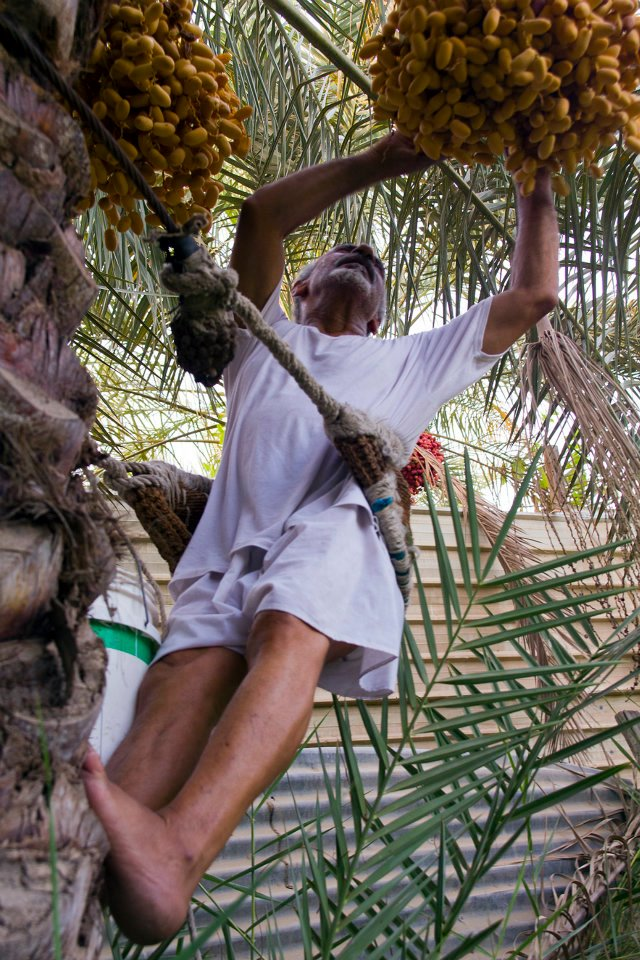
An elderly farmer amidst his crops in Qatif, 2012 – a symbol of dedication

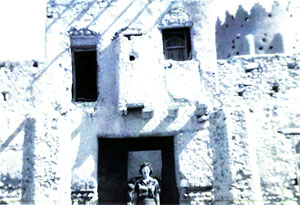
A woman stands before an Ottoman-era Turkish fort, Qatif, 1950

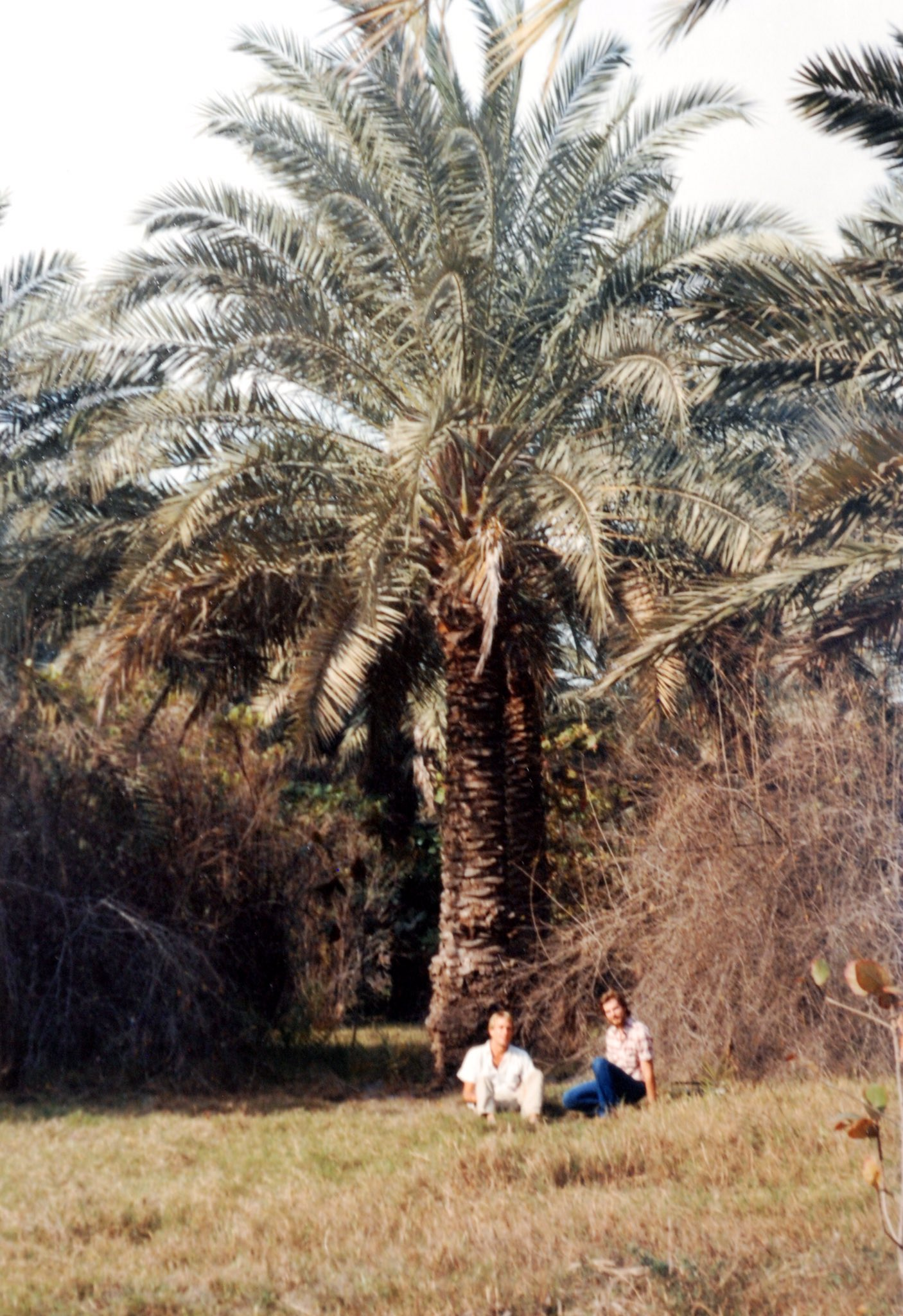
Two people enjoying nature in Qatif, 1978.

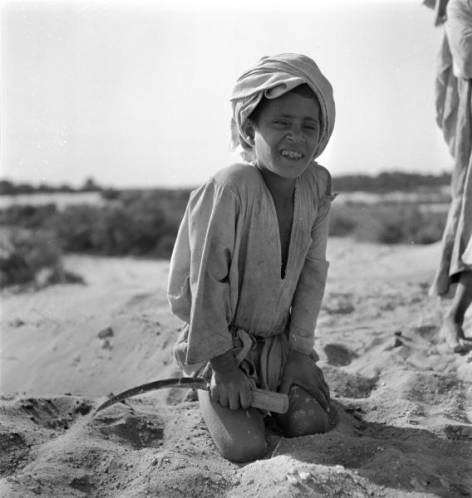
A Qatifi boy engaged in labor, 1947 – a reflection of the times

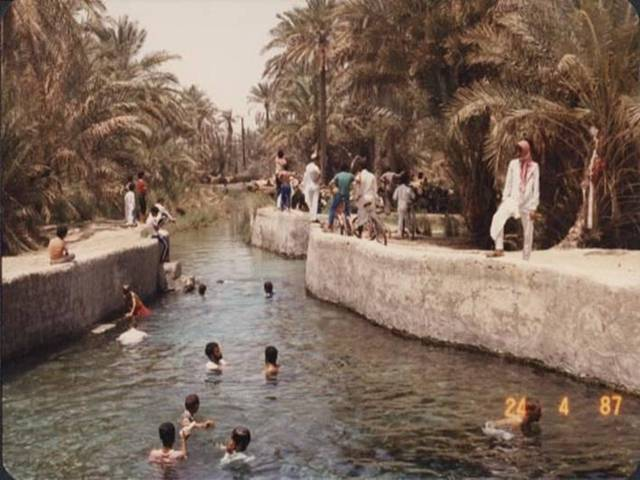
Young men swimming in Al-Awamiyah – a favorite local pastime

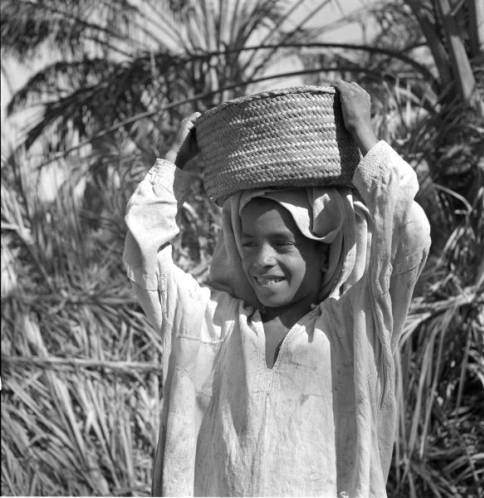
A young boy carrying freshly harvested dates, Qatif, 1947

== See also ==
- List of cities and towns in Saudi Arabia
- List of governorates of Saudi Arabia
