= Aseel =

Aseel may refer to: Gender Neutral Arabic Name. Which is Distinguished by two different letters in Arabic to Refer to the person's gender

- Aseel (name)
- Aseel (platform), an e-commerce platform
- Aseel, a type of ghee
- Aseel (chicken)

== See also ==
- Asil (disambiguation)
