= Al-Dafi Site =

Al-Dafi site

General information
- Type: Historical
- Location: Eastern Province - Jubail
- Country: Saudi Arabia

The Al-Dafi archaeological site is situated near the city of Jubail, Saudi Arabia. The site was established around the 2nd century BCE, and it was re-discovered between 1404 and 1408 AH (1983 and 1988 CE).

== Label and Location ==
Al-Dafi is 6 kilometers from the western edge of Abu Ali Island. Al-Dafi is named after the shallow bay that lies between the western coast of Al-Khursaniyah and the islands of Abu Ali and Al-Batinah. Since the site is on property owned by the Royal Commission for Jubail and Yanbu and is in Jubail Industrial City, it is also known as Doha Al-Dafi. Specifically, the site is situated among the Jubail Industrial College's residences, which are north of Jubail. According to Hilda Lorimer, Fares bin Muhammad, the ruler of the Banu Khalid, lived in Al-Dafi.

== Description of site ==
The site was a residential neighborhood with homes that include some plumbing, reception and leisure areas, and storage areas. It appears as though the dwellings were maintained over a long time period, possibly dating back to pre-Islamic periods, and occupation continuing until the late-Islamic period. There are pieces of shattered alkaline-glazed and non-glazed pottery scattered around the site. Archaeological mounds are dispersed around the area at random. Discoveries were made as a result of further excavations at the location, including a palace. Along with several censers made of limestone, the site also held shattered pots made of soapstone or marble.

Comparative archaeological analysis of the ceramics found at the site suggests that Al-Dafi witnessed a cultural flourishing during the period of the intermediate Arab kingdoms, which is typically dated to the period between the third century BC and the end of the second century CE. The site contained distinctive pottery types that have been discovered at other known sites on the eastern Arabian Peninsula. The site has linkages to the Thaj site, sites in the Eastern Province south of Dhahran, the Al-Faw site in Wadi Al-Dawasir, and the Failaka Island site in the State of Kuwait. Two thousand years ago, the location would have been near the ancient city of Thaj.

Al-Dafi's dimensions are 235 x 200 meters, and excavations there yielded the following notable finds:

- An abundance of pottery in a variety of sizes and shapes, as well as 149 bags worth of pottery fragments.
- Clay statues, also known as terracotta statues.
- Beads for use as ornamentation, made of soap, alabaster, and stone, also revealing the site's age.
- Tools made of glass, metal, and wood, including a translucent glass shard with a mysterious shape, an oxidized copper rod, a small copper ring, and a high-quality fragment of a small wooden comb.

== Hellenistic Architecture ==
According to historian Ali Al-Durora, Al-Dafi's excavations are thought to have unearthed the most significant Hellenistic city on the eastern coast with complete architecture. The recently discovered Hellenic architecture provides crucial cues about the people who lived in Jubail 2,100 years ago, including their use of domes, shoulders and pillars to mimic the texture of tensile lines, cylindrical vaults supported on enormous walls, and vaults used to protect buildings. One of the most significant characteristics of Hellenic architecture is the use of materials in accordance with their nature, so the shapes that were used in wood were not duplicated. This is in addition to strikingly wide and clear walls, the use of fine columns along entrances and facades, the use of towers with small windows for protection, and the use of cavities set into walls. When stone was employed in place of wood, as was the case in many other ancient architectural styles, stone and wood were used less fluidly, in accordance with specific architectural requirements.

== Additional Historical Conclusions ==
The Arab Mamluks enjoyed wealth between 300 BC and 300 AD, according to relative dating and further archaeological analysis of the materials found in descending strata.
