= Jubail Industrial College =

Technical college in Saudi Arabia

- Type: Government run
- Established: 1989; 37 years ago
- Director: Eid M. Al Hajri
- Academic staff: 300
- Administrative staff: 140
- Students: 2524
- Location: Jubail Industrial City, Eastern Province, Saudi Arabia
- Website: jic.edu.sa

Jubail Industrial College is a technical college in Saudi Arabia established in 1989 by the Royal Commission for Jubail and Yanbu, in Jubail Industrial City on the coast of the Persian Gulf.

== Departments and majors ==
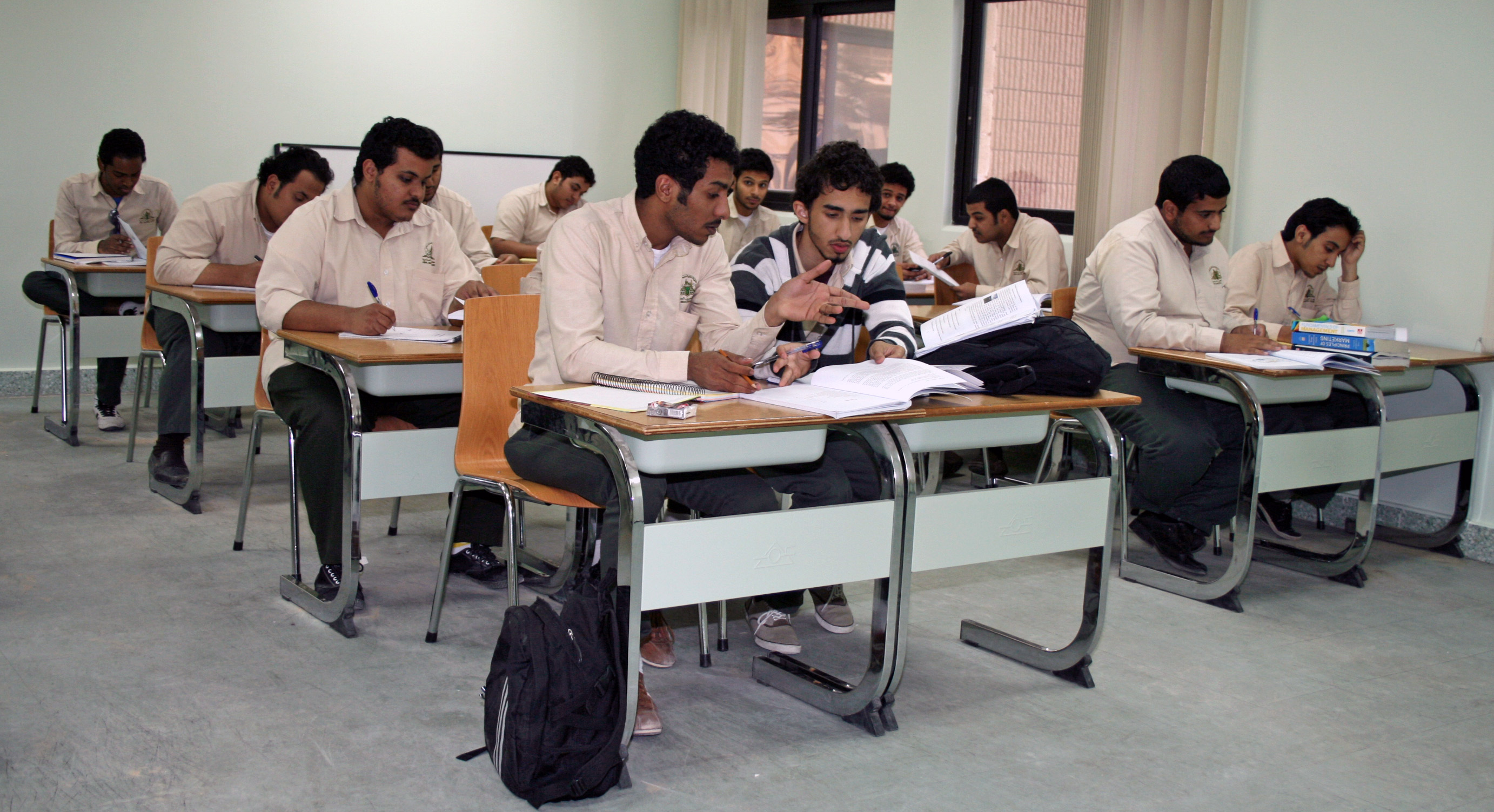
Saudi students at Jubail Industrial College

There are six departments at Jubail Industrial college.

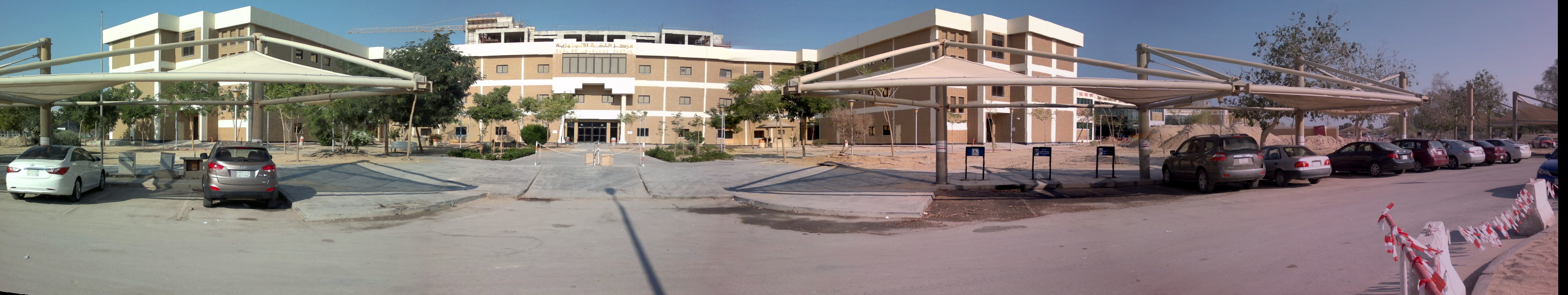
Panoramic View of the English Language Center

== See also ==
- List of universities and colleges in Saudi Arabia
