= Don't You Need Somebody =

Single by RedOne featuring Enrique Iglesias, R. City, Serayah and Shaggy
- Released: 20 May 2016
- Genre: Europop; dance-pop
- Length: 3:27
- Label: Warner Bros.
- Songwriters: Orville Burrell; Enrique Iglesias; Andre Fennell; Nadir Khayat; Sean Douglas; Rosina Russell; T.I Jakke Erixson; Martin James; Mehdi Bouamer
- Producer: RedOne

RedOne singles chronology
"A-Ricky-Kee" (2014)	"Don't You Need Somebody" (2016)	"Voy a Bailar" (2017)

R. City singles chronology
"Singing in the Rain" (2016)	"Don't You Need Somebody" (2016)	"Bang Bang" (2016)

Enrique Iglesias singles chronology
"Duele el Corazón" (2016)	"Don't You Need Somebody" (2016)	"Súbeme la Radio" (2017)

Shaggy singles chronology
"Passion" (2015)	"Don't You Need Somebody" (2016)	"I Got You" (2016)

Serayah singles chronology
"Look Back Don't Touch" (2016)	"Don't You Need Somebody" (2016)	"Driving Me" (2017)

Music video
- "Don't You Need Somebody" on YouTube

Music video
- "Don't You Need Somebody" (Friends of RedOne's Version) on YouTube

"Don't You Need Somebody" is a song by Moroccan record producer RedOne that features collective vocals by Enrique Iglesias, R. City, Serayah, and Shaggy. It was released on 20 May 2016.

== Music video ==
An official music video was released on 1 August 2016 on RedOne's official channel on YouTube. The video directed by Derek Pike features RedOne gathering people from all walks of life to come together for a party in the city streets.

The previously released Friends of RedOne's Version of the video released on 9 June 2016, includes footage of RedOne with his son, the four featured artists Enrique Iglesias, R. City, Serayah and Shaggy performing the song alongside a host of other personalities pitching in with video footage including singers Akon, Thanh Bùi (of the band North), Aseel Omran, Moroccan rapper and record producer Ali B, Maître Gims, German YouTuber Bianca Heinicke, Jennifer Lopez, John Mamann, Alex Sparrow, David A. Stewart (of the Eurythmics), Kaya Stewart, Jay McGuiness (of The Wanted), French Montana, Tal, The Band Perry, songwriter Bibi Bourelly and Palestinian singer Mohammed Assaf, as well as actor Jean-Claude Van Damme, actor and singer Max Schneider, actress Milla Jovovich, actress and singer Priyanka Chopra, actor and singer Kevin McHale, artist Mr. Brainwash, comedian Howie Mandel, dancer Aliona Vilani, dermatologist Dr. Simon Ourian, media personalities Simo Benbachir (aka Simobb), Perez Hilton, Randy Jackson and Ryan Seacrest, TV personality Kaitlyn Bristowe, model Kristina Bazan, and famous sports personalities who pitched in with their own segments including Blaise Matuidi, David Luiz, Rafael Nadal, Josh Norman, Mesut Özil, James Rodríguez, Cristiano Ronaldo and others. The Video was edited by Mike Anderson of Longmeadow Massachusetts. Mike worked alongside RedOne in his studio for two months getting new footage from celebrity friends of RedOne.

== Track listing ==
Digital download

1. "Don't You Need Somebody" (featuring Enrique Iglesias, R. City, Serayah and Shaggy) – 3:27

Digital download

1. "Don't You Need Somebody" (featuring Enrique Iglesias, Aseel and Shaggy) – 3:34

Remixes – EP

1. "Don't You Need Somebody" (featuring Enrique Iglesias, R. City, Serayah and Shaggy) [Josh Bernstein – Rannix remix] – 3:11
2. "Don't You Need Somebody" (featuring Enrique Iglesias, R. City, Serayah and Shaggy) [Dash Berlin remix] – 3:02
3. "Don't You Need Somebody" (featuring Enrique Iglesias, R. City, Serayah and Shaggy) [Ishi remix] – 3:32
4. "Don't You Need Somebody" (featuring Enrique Iglesias, R. City, Serayah and Shaggy) [Savi x Lema remix] – 3:41
5. "Don't You Need Somebody" (featuring Enrique Iglesias, R. City, Serayah and Shaggy) [Tropixx Island House remix] – 3:28

Cahill Remix

1. "Don't You Need Somebody" (featuring Enrique Iglesias, R. City, Serayah and Shaggy) [Cahill Remix] – 3:39

== Other versions ==
With the popularity of the song, language versions are being launched. For the Arab world, a bilingual Arabic and English version was launched by RedOne featuring Enrique Iglesias, Shaggy and for the Arabic section the singer Aseel Omran.

== Charts ==
=== Weekly charts ===
Chart (2016–18)	Peak position
Belgium (Ultratip Bubbling Under Wallonia)	14
Ecuador (National-Report)	47
France (SNEP)	150
Lebanon (Lebanese Top 20)	5
Netherlands (Dutch Top 40 Tipparade)	3
Poland Airplay (ZPAV)	16
Slovakia Airplay (ČNS IFPI)	2
Spain (Promusicae)	18
Sweden (Sverigetopplistan)	7
Switzerland (Schweizer Hitparade)	19
US Pop Airplay (Billboard)	32
US Rhythmic Airplay (Billboard)	37

=== Year-end charts ===
Chart (2016)	Position
Sweden (Sverigetopplistan)	53
Switzerland (Schweizer Hitparade)	98

== Certifications ==
Region	Certification	Certified units/sales
Sweden (GLF)	3× Platinum	120,000^{‡}
Switzerland (IFPI Switzerland)	Gold	15,000^{‡}
^{‡} Sales+streaming figures based on certification alone.
