= Lojain Omran =

Saudi Arabian television presenter and internet personality

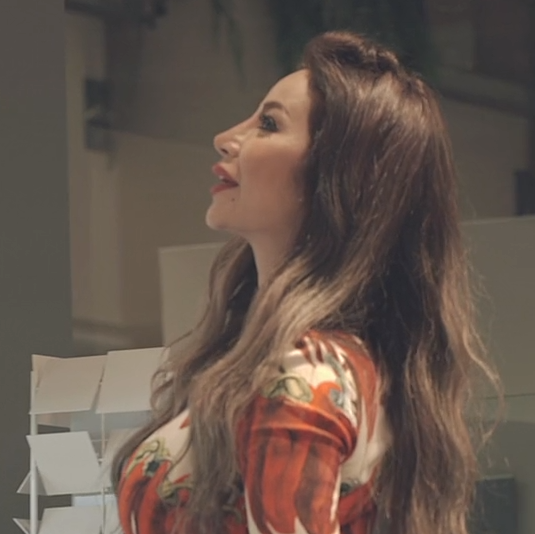
- Omran in 2017
- Born: Lojain Omran; 26 October 1977 (age 48); Jubail, Saudi Arabia
- Occupations: Television presenter, Social media personality
- Relatives: Aseel Omran (sister)

Lojain Omran (born 26 October 1977) is a Saudi Arabian television presenter and social media personality. She presented a show on a channel in Bahrain and was a cast member on the Netflix original reality television show, Dubai Bling (2022).

== Early and personal life ==
Omran was born on 26 October 1977 in Jubail, Eastern Province. Her father is Ahmed Omran and she has three siblings, two brothers Mazen Omran and Basil Omran and a sister actress Aseel Omran. She moved to Bahrain in 2001, where she continued her banking career and later became an operations manager at Alawwal Bank, formerly Saudi Hollandi Bank. She later worked at Citibank in Bahrain before becoming an Operations Manager at Fotoon Edu-Tinment, a position she held until 2004.

== Career ==
Omran's TV programmes before Good Morning Arabs! included The Situation with Lojain, Ya Hala, Around the Gulf and World of Eve.

Forbes included her at number 55 in their 2017 list of 100 Arab celebrities, one of five Saudi people listed.

Omran has been described as "one of the most influential media personalities in the Middle East".

Omran has more than 11 million followers on her Instagram account, and as one of the five "most popular fashion and beauty influencers" affecting millennials in the UAE. Gulf Business listed her as number 87 in its Arab Power List 2018, describing her as an "Influencer / TV Host".
