= Ibrahim Al-Siddiqi =

Saudi-Bahraini writer and poet

- إبراهيم الصديقي
- Born: 1915; Jubail, Saudi Arabia
- Died: 1989 (aged 74); Ta'if, Saudi Arabia
- Occupation(s): writer, poet, teacher

Ibrahim Al-Siddiqi (Arabic: إبراهيم الصديقي, born 1915, died 1989) was a Saudi-Bahraini writer and poet. He was born in Jubail, studied with Sheikh Muhammad bin Manea al-Najdi, and engaged in teaching, preaching, and counseling. He wrote many books, manuscripts, and poems.

== Biography ==
Al-Siddiqi was born in 1915 in Jubail. Educated in a traditional kuttab, he worked as a teacher and imam and studied with Muhammad bin Manea al-Najdi. Al-Najdi was close to the princes of Bahrain, thus opening doors for Al-Siddiqi at prestigious literary gatherings and debates.

Al-Siddiqi was well-versed in both religious studies and the Arabic language, and conversant on the political and business news of the day. He often hosted friends at his home, talked with writers, read and researched books, and wrote criticism.

== Work ==
- 1965 – سلافة الأدب – الطائف: المؤلف، 1385 هـ، 216 ص. أعيد طبعه سنة 1995م. (“Column in Sulafat al-Adab p. 216,” reprinted in 1995)
- حياة القائد الأعظم محمد. (“The Life of the Great Prophet Muhammad”)
- تصحيح القاموس. (“Dictionary Editing”)
- تنبيه العام والخاص. (“Public and Private Attention”)
- معلوماتي العامة عن البلدان العربية. (“General Survey of the Arab World”)
- ورع العلماء. (“Pious Scholars”)
- نقع الأريج من أشعار أدباء الخليج. (“Breathe in the Fragrance of Gulf Poetry”)
- خير الطراز من أشعار عباقرة نجد والحجاز. (“The Stylistic Genius of Najd and Hejaz poetry”)
- ملتقطات الدرر من منتخبات الفكر. (“Diving for Pearls of Wisdom”)
- ضالة الأدباء وبغية الشعراء والخطباء. (“Appendix of Lost Writers and Poets”)

Al-Siddiqi also edited an anthology of contemporary Saudi poetry regularly published by the Ta’if Literary Club, based in the popular resort town of the aristocracy.

== Death ==
He died in 1989, on September 14 according to one source, though another dated it toward the end of the year. Both agree that he died in Ta’if.
