= Ibrahim Al-Hsawi =

Saudi Arabian actor and poet (born 1964)

Ibrahim Al-Hsawi ابراهيم الحساوي
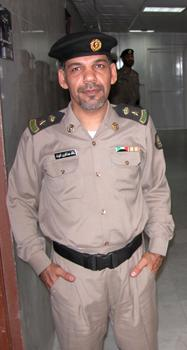
- Born: November 6, 1964 (age 61); Al-Hasa, Saudi Arabia
- Occupation: Actor
- Years active: 1980–present

Ibrahim Al-Hsawi (Arabic: ابراهيم الحساوي; born November 6, 1964) is a Saudi Arabian actor and poet. He acted in several series including Tash ma Tash.

== Career ==
Al-Hsawi started his acting career in 1980 in the Theater of Al-Adlah Club. He took some big roles onstage, and he participated in his first action TV role in 1989 in the show called Kaznah (English: Safe) with Ali Al-Sebaa. He also starred in the famous serial Tash ma Tash.

== Acting works ==
=== Series ===
- Kaznah (Arabic: Safe) 1989
- Tash ma Tash (English: no big deal)
- Akoon Aw La (2012) MBC Production
- Al-Saknat Fe Klobna (English: The inhabitants in our hearts) also MBC Production
- Magazif Al-Amal (English: Oars hope)
- Hartna Heloah (English: Sweet Alley)
- (English: The path of love)
- Leila (English: nightly)
- Bayni Wa Bynak (English: Between me and you)
- Ala Motha ogani (English: I sing to her death).

=== Plays ===
- Imru al-Qais
- moat Al-mogani farag (English: The death of singer Farag)
- Safi (Arabic: Netly)
- Moat Al-Molaf (English: Death of the author)

=== Movies ===
- Ayash (English: Alive)
