= Akoon Aw La =

Television series

- أكون أو لا
- Created by: Hussain al-Mahdi
- Directed by: Aly Al Aly
- Theme music composer: Ali Bahar, Aseel Hameem
- No. of seasons: 1
- No. of episodes: 30

Production
- Running time: 45 minutes

Original release
- Network: MBC 1
- Release: March 3, 2012 – 2012

Akoon Aw La (Arabic: أكون أو لا, lit. "To Be or Not to Be") is a Bahraini television series directed by Aly Al Aly and written by Hussain al-Mahdi.

== Synopsis ==
In a small village on the outskirts of a city in the 1990s, forty-something woman Amna’s husband dies of a terminal illness. She decides to continue in his line of work and raises their sons, the benevolent Salem and the wily Aziz. She Amna also takes in her niece Khadija after the death of her wealthy merchant father, leading Aziz to seduce his cousin for her fortune. When Amna has Salem marry Khadija instead, Aziz concocts schemes to discredit Khadija. They are foiled, and Aziz is arrested and imprisoned with his accomplice, the mukhtar (village elder) Sheikh Abdul Malik.

== Cast ==
- Basma Hamada as Amna
- Khaled Amin as Aziz ibn Amna
- Hamad Al Omani as Salem ibn Amna
- Somoud Alkandari as Saja, niece of Amna
- Buthaina Al Raisi as Khadija, niece of Amna
- Salah Al-Mulla as Mustapha
- Ibrahim Al-Hsawi as Sheikh Abdul Malik
- Aseel Omran as Soraya
- Laila Abdullah as Radia
- Ahmed Issa as Hamza
- Shamaa Mohammed as Soraya’s mother
- Mubarak Khamis as Hamed
- Sami Rashdan as Fathy
- Samira Al Wahaibi as Salma
- Shayma Janahi as Bashayer
- Shaima Sabt as Iman
- Amina Al Qafaas
- Ali Al-Jabri as Abu Halala
- Hussain Al-Jamri as Majid
- Muhammad Al-Saffar as Sheikh Hani
