= Rajaa Mohammed =

Syrian actress and singer (1962–2026)

- رجاء محمد
- Born: Raja Mohammed Saleem; 4 October 1962; Kuwait
- Died: 20 October 2026 (aged 64)
- Occupations: Actress; singer
- Years active: 1978–1983

Rajaa Mohammed (Arabic: رجاء محمد; 4 October 1962 – 20 October 2026) was a Kuwaiti actress and singer who started acting at the end of 1978.

== Early life ==
Mohammed was born in Kuwait to a Syrian father and a Kuwaiti mother. She was the sister of actress Awatif Mohammed and a relative of the retired singer Al-Anoud. She began her artistic career at the age of sixteen in the play Sinbad the Sailor which was performed in 1978 with actors Abdul Rahman Al-Aql and Istiqlal Ahmed. She continued acting in small roles in various productions, and her singing and acting career flourished thereafter. She also performed solo songs in the educational series Open Sesame. During that period, she was considered one of the most prominent young female artists in the Gulf. In 1983, she performed her last two acting roles in My Aunt Qumasha and the Cinderella Operetta, after which she disappeared from the artistic scene entirely, except for a brief interview with the Kuwaiti newspaper Al-Anbaa in 1989.

== Death ==
Mohammed died on 20 October 2026, aged 64.

== Series ==
- Ila Abi w Amwi Maa Althih (1979–1982)
- Ahlam Saghrih (1982)
- Khalti qmasha (1983)

== Songs ==
- "Arz Meknes" (1983)
