= Asil (name) =

- Gender: Male/Female
- Language: Arabic

Origin
- Origin: Arabia
- Meaning: Evening/Noble

Other names
- Alternative spelling: Aseel

Asil (alternative spelling: Aseel; Arabic: أَصِيْل) is an Arabic unisex given name meaning “evening time”, “nighttime”. Asil can also mean “deep-rooted”, “original”, “noble” with the same spelling and pronunciation. It's a Quranic name mentioned 4 times in the Quran at 25:5, 33:42, 48:9 and 76:25. It's also mentioned 3 other times in its plural form (Aasaal) at 13:15, 7:205, 24:36.

== Given name ==
=== Aseel ===
- Aseel Anabtawi (born 1969), Palestinian-American electrical engineer
- Aseel al-Awadhi (born 1969), Kuwaiti politician
- Aseel Al-Hamad, Saudi Arabian interior designer, engineer, and motorsport enthusiast
- Aseel Hameem (born 1984), Iraqi singer
- Aseel Omran (born 1989), Saudi Arabian actress and singer

=== Asil ===
- Asil Attar, Iraqi businesswoman
- Asil Kaan Güler (born 1994), Turkish footballer
- Asil Nadir (1941–2025), British businessman
