= Asil =

Asil may refer to:

- Asil (name)
- American Society of International Law (ASIL)
- Asil, Arabian horses who have pedigrees that can be traced to identifiable desert-bred horses from the Middle East
- Asil chicken, a breed of chicken
- Asil Kara, a synonym for the wine grape variety Băbească neagră
- ASIL Lysi, a Cypriot football club
- Automotive Safety Integrity Level (ASIL), a risk classification scheme

== See also ==
- L'Asile, a commune in the Nippes department of Haiti
