= Istiqlal Ahmed =

Bahraini actress

- استقلال أحمد
- Born: February 12, 1950 (age 76)
- Occupation: actress
- Years active: 1975—Present
- Children: Zaid, Sarah, Mounia, Maryam

Istiqlal Ahmad (Arabic: استقلال أحمد), is a Bahraini actress and media personality of Iraqi origin. She was born and raised in Kuwait, but moved to Bahrain following her marriage and stayed there since.

== Biography ==
Ahmad was born a few months after Kuwait gained its independence, the source of her first name (from the Arabic word for “independence”). Her brother is the actor Kazem Al-Zamil. She was interested in the arts from an early age, participating actively in school theatre productions. After graduating from high school, she enrolled in the local Higher Institute of Dramatic Arts, majoring in theatre, literature, and criticism.

=== Performing career ===
Ahmad’s first public role was a 1975 teleplay entitled منى (“Mona”), which she starred in at the age of fourteen. However, her breakthrough role was in Darb al-Zalaq, a seminal 1977 satire in which she co-starred with Abdulhussain Abdulredha. This began a string of high-profile roles continuing through the 1988 serial الرجال لعبتهم النقود (“The Men Have Placed Their Bets”), her last role before she left for Bahrain.

=== Marriage and retirement ===
After marrying a Bahraini broadcaster, she left for Bahrain and retired from acting. They had five children, including two sons and three daughters. She continued participating in media, however, and is a broadcaster and published poet.

In 1992, she began co-hosting "صباح الخير يا بحرين" (“Good Morning Bahrain”) with Aisha Abdul Latif. The show had a national reach, and Ahmad would remain an anchor there, save for a short withdrawal in 2012.

== Career ==
=== Television ===
Filmography
Year	Series or Teleplay
1975	منى (“Mona”), teleplay
1975	الوريث (“The Heir”)
1975	وذاب الجليد (“And the Ice Melted”), teleplay
1975	نورة (“Norah”)
1977	والدي العزيز (“My Dear Father”)
1977	الشمس فوق البطاح (“The Sun Shines on Filth”), teleplay
1977	Darb al-Zalaq
1977	دنيا المهابيل (“Dunya Al-Makhil”)
1977	ابن العطار (“Ibn Al-Attar”)
1977	إجازة أم (“Mother’s Leave”), teleplay
1978	Third Floor
1978	في منتصف الليل (“At Midnight”)
1978	بنت البادية (“Badia Girl”)
1979	الحظ والملايين (“Luck and Millions”)
1979	وعندما تحترق الشموع (“And When the Candles Burn”), teleplay
1980	Salamtak, special
1982	النساء لعبتهن الألوان (“Women Have Played Colors”)
1983	Khalti Gmasha
1983	غدا تبدأ الحياة (“Life Begins Tomorrow”)
1983	ألبوم صور (“Photo Album”)
1985	حكاية خلف الجدران (“Story Behind the Walls”)
1988	الرجال لعبتهم النقود (“The Men Have Placed Their Bets”)
2019	Ana Andi Nuss

=== Theatre ===
Acting career
Year	Play	Dramatist
1976	The Victim of Prosperity	Saad Al Faraj and Abdulhussain Abdulredha
1976	عالم غريب غريب غريب (“Strange, Strange World”)	Tariq Abdul Latif
1978	Sinbad the Sailor	Mahfouz Abdel Rahman
1978	Groom to the Sultan’s Daughter	Mahfouz Abdel Rahman
1983	توم وجيري عفوا جسوم ومشيري (“Yassim and Mishar Pardon Tom and Jerry”)	Fahd Al-Sultan
1983	أفراح والشجعان الثلاثة (“Afrah and the Three Heroes”)	Khalifa Al-Rabiah
1983	Fursan Al Manakh	Abdulhussain Abdulredha
1984	فرحة الأمة (“The Nation’s Joy”)	Abdulhussain Abdulredha
1984	الشاطر حسن (“Good Boy”)	El-Sayed Hafez and Mohamed Gaber
1985	Ali Baba’s Trial	El-Sayed Hafez and Mohamed Gaber
1985	حديث الديرة (“Hadith Deira”)	
1987	Antarah ibn Shaddad	El-Sayed Hafez and Sami Al-Faraj
1987	برشامة (“Rivet”)	Abdelaziz El Moslem

=== Radio ===
Broadcasting career
Year	Show
1992—Present	صباح الخير يا بحرين (“Good Morning, Bahrain”)
2008	الجيران (“Neighbors”)

=== Film ===
Filmography
Year	Film
1982	القرار (“Decision”)

== Awards ==
She won the 2008 Best Actress in a Radio Drama award in Cairo for her role in الجيران.
