= Laila Abdallah =

Lebanese actress based in Kuwait (born 1996)

Laila Abdullah
- Born: Laila Abdallah Al-Fayed; 8 January 1996 (age 30); Kuwait
- Occupations: Actress, Television personality
- Years active: 2009–present
- Spouse: Abdallah Abass (m. 2017; div. 2018)

Laila Abdullah Al-Fayed (Arabic: ليلى عبد الله الفايد; born 8 January 1996) is a Lebanese actress based in Kuwait. She is known for her acting roles in television series broadcast in Kuwait and the rest of the Middle East.

== Early life ==
Laila was born in Kuwait to Bedouin Lebanese parents. Her parents are deaf and mute and she learned sign language. Her younger sister Shahad Abdallah is also an actress.

== Career ==
As a young teenager, Laila began her career as a model in music videos, including for a song by the Saudi singer Abdul Majeed Abdullah. Her first role was in the television show Saher Al-lail in 2010, where she impressed the director Muhammad Dahham Al-Shammari who cast her a recurring role in his subsequent television series Tu Nahar. She later starred in the comedy series Bab Al-Faraj alongside Ali Jumaa and Elham Al-Fadala.

== Personal life ==
In December 2017, she married Iranian actor Abdallah Abass, but they divorced after a couple months in February 2018. In June 2024, she was seen publicly dating with American singer Joe Jonas in Greece.

== Works ==
=== TV Series ===
- Saher Al-lail (2010)
- Evil Souls 3 (2010)
- Tu Nahar (2010)
- Saher Al Lail 2: Zenat Al Hayat (2011)
- Bab Al-Faraj (2011)
- Lahfat Al Khater (2011)
- The Pain of Victory (2011)
- Teach Me How to Forget You (2012)
- Akoon Aw La (2012)
- Ghareeb Al Dar (2012)
- University Girls (2012)
- Kinat al-Sham Wa Kanayen al-Shamiya (2012)
- Hajr al-Habib (2012)
- Jar Al-Qamar (2013)
- Sir al Hawa (2013)
- I will see you good (2014)
- Al-Wajha (2014)
- Maskanak Yewfy (2014)
- High heel (2014)
- Breaking Thoughts (2014)
- Uncle Saqer (2015)
- There is a Song in Her Eyes (2015)
- Girl and Old man (2015)
- Zero Hour (2016)
- After The end (2016)
- Pomegranate (2017)
- Little Sky (2017)
- No Parking (2017)
- Ham Nawaya (2018)
- Alkhafi aatham (2018)
- The street crossing (2018)
- Agenda (2019)
- Thorn hugging (2019)

=== Plays ===
- Love Story (2011)
- Alghoul (2011)
- Dreams of a Homeland (2012)
- The Wizard's Castle (2012)
- Cocoa Factory (2013)
- Newspaper Seller (2014)
- Ghost Scream (2015)
- Khamis kemash khashem habash (2015)
- Roman Bath (2016)
- Kids area (2017)
- Tomorrow (2018)
- Friends of clouds (2019)

=== Movies ===
- 090 (2014)
- Apartment 6 (2015)
- Baby (2016)
- On Borrowed Time (2018)

=== Hosting ===
- Tarek show (2014)
- Inzel boshinki (2019)
