= Shamaa Mohammed =

Omani television actress (1958–2022)

- شمعة مُحمَّد عبد الله الهوتي
- Born: 19 February 1958; Muscat, Oman
- Died: 16 March 2022 (aged 64); Riyadh, Saudi Arabia
- Occupation: television actress
- Children: 4

Shamaa Mohammed (Arabic: شمعة مُحمَّد عبد الله الهوتي) (19 February 1958 – 16 March 2022) was an Omani television actress.

== Biography ==
Mohammed was born in Muscat in 1958 and was educated in Kuwait and Bahrain. Her father worked in the oil sector. She returned to Oman in 1974, where she worked at the Ministry of Education then at the Tender Board as deputy director of Public Relations.

Mohammed began her acting career in 1978, which coincided with the so-called "Blessed Renaissance" in Oman in the 1970s. She was known for television roles in Akoon Aw La, Al Asouf, Tash Ma Tash, Ghorba Masaher, and Adhari and also starred in theatre productions. She enjoyed popularity in the Sultanate of Oman and the wider Gulf region. In 2012, she spoke about her career at the 13th Kuwait Theatre Festival.

Mohammed was also a volunteer for humanitarian initiatives and participated in events for children with cancer in Omani hospitals. She also taught at acting workshops for children.

On 16 March 2022, Mohammed suffered from a heart attack while filming a new series in Riyadh, Saudi Arabia and died, aged 64.
