= On Borrowed Time (2018 film) =

- Directed by: Yasir Al Yasiri
- Written by: Yasir Al Yasiri
- Produced by: Rami Yasin
- Starring: Saad Al Faraj; Salloum Haddad; Mansoor Al Feeli; Fouad Ali
- Cinematography: Adrian Silisteanu
- Edited by: Shahnaz Dulaimy
- Music by: Jerry Lane
- Production company: Imagenation Abu Dhabi FZ [ae]
- Distributed by: Tanweer
- Release date: 18 November 2018
- Running time: 94 minutes
- Country: United Arab Emirates
- Language: Arabic

On Borrowed Time (Original Arabic title: Shabab Sheyab) is an Arabic-language 2018 comedy drama film directed and written by Yasir Al Yasiri.

== Cast ==
- Saad Al Faraj as Abu Hassan
- Salloum Haddad as The General
- Mansoor Al Feeli as The pharmacist
- Fouad Ali as Khaled
- Marei Al Halyan as Abu Hamad
- Laila Abdallah as Ruqayyah

== Reception ==
The film premiered at the Palm Springs International Film Festival in California. The film got the attention of the US media. The film after that was shown in many other film festivals in the United States winning two awards as best film and getting high reviews as one of the best international films coming from the Arab world.
