= Al-Tawiya Tower =

Fortress tower in Saudi Arabia

Tawia Tower

General information
- Type: tower, fortress
- Location: Jubail, Saudi Arabia
- Coordinates: 27°0′45.7″N 49°38′13.12″E

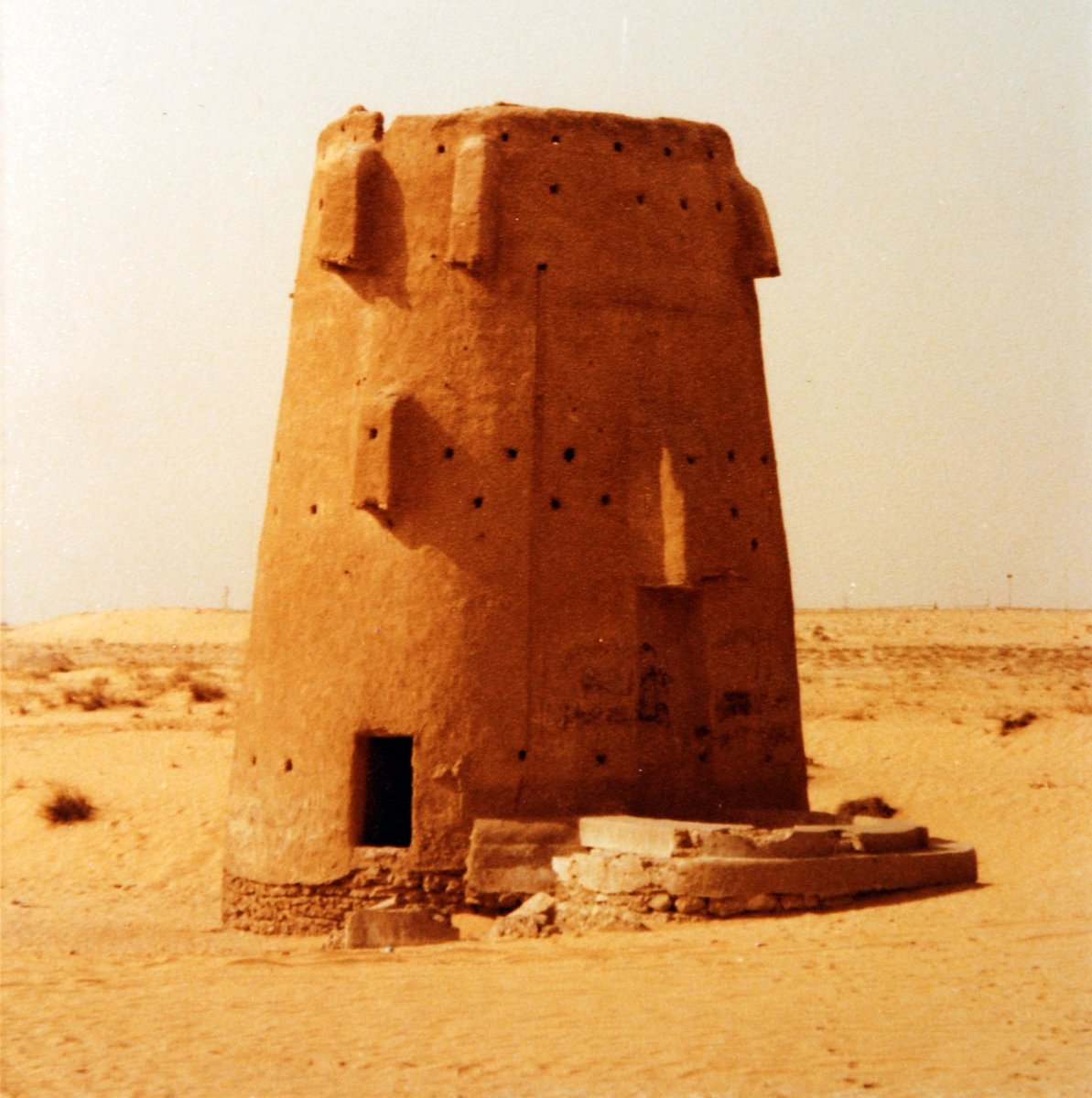
The Al Tawiyah tower along the Dammam-Jubail road in 1978.

A fortress tower known as Al-Tawiya Tower, Al-Tawiya Fort, or Al-Tawiya Fortress Tower is situated in Jubail, Saudi Arabia. It is thought that the fort was built in 1928 in order to safeguard the Al-Tawiya well. The final tower of Al-Tawiya Fort was built, which helped to hide it from visitors behind the tall woods so that it might become a truck stop.

== Geographical location ==
The fort is situated in the current heart of Jubail and on the western side of the former Jubail Governorate.

== Label ==
The Towiya Tower was given its name after the well that guards it, and it is rumored that the well next to it is folded in shape.

== The fort's well ==
Near the fort is where you'll find the Al-Tawiya well. The Bedouin tribe used to go to this water source to water their animals in the past. Before the construction of artesian wells, the well served as Jubail's residents' primary supply of water. Years before the nineteenth century AD, the Al-Tawiya well was well-known, but it is now underground.

== Constructing the fort ==
Following the arrival of news stating that some Bedouin tribes were determined to attack the coastal cities (Jubail, Al-Qatif Governorate, and Al-Ahsa), the people prepared for defense and assisted in the construction of the Al-Tawiya Fort, which was built in 1928 AD, after the Battle of Al-Sabla, by order of Abdulaziz Al Saud. And the tower was built by the Buainain family and by Ibn Radi and Youssef Al-Madallah (coming from Al-Zubayr at that time and was nicknamed Al-Zubairi) with 15 other workers. They distributed weapons to the people, and were stationed for more than 6 months in Al-Tawiya. Along with 15 other workmen, the Buainain family, Ibn Radi, and Youssef Al-Madallah—who at the time was known by the nickname Al-Zubairi—built the tower. They gave out firearms to the populace and stayed in Al-Tawiya for over six months. On orders from the Emir of Jubail at the time, they used to go on reconnaissance tours and would eventually reach the outskirts of Al-Khursaniyah and the heights of Al-Bayda. They would repeat these trips once in the morning and once in the evening. More than 4,000 fighters from the tribes assembled to take Jubail and Al-Ahsa, but the roads leading to the town were closed, and King Abdul Aziz's troops halted them. from the tribes of Al-Awazim and routed them before they made their way to Jubail. They gave him the defeated party's flanks when he accepted them.Sabq Electronic Newspaper.

== Current issues ==
Long ago, the Jubail Governorate municipality developed the site, but it was not done effectively, especially since the area around the tower made it harder to exhibit it to bystanders and visitors while giving the impression that it was a historical landmark or a symbol of the city.

The location requires improvement in order to better showcase the landmark, reorganize the area, and create open green spaces that don't block the view of the tower. Additionally, the website must be equipped with The region where the tower is located desperately needs sidewalks, corridors, and contemporary benches to be stretched out, as well as searchlights to illuminate the area at night. It offers visitors, hikers, and tourists various facilities throughout the green spaces.
