= Jubail Airport =

- IATA: none; ICAO: OEJB

Summary
- Airport type: Military/Private
- Owner: Ministry of Defence
- Operator: Royal Saudi Navy
- Serves: Jubail
- Location: Jubail
- Elevation AMSL: 26 ft / 8 m
- Coordinates: 27°02′20.5″N 49°24′18.5″E

Map
- Location of airport in Saudi Arabia

Runways
Direction	Length		Surface
Direction	ft	m	Surface
17/35	13,123	4,000	Asphalt

Jubail Airport (Arabic: مطار الجبيل Matar al-Jubayl) is an airfield 25 kilometres (16 mi) west of Jubail City in the Eastern Province of Saudi Arabia. It is located near the industrial area, about 7.5 kilometres (4.7 mi) to the shores of Dohat ad Dafi, one of the shallow bays near Jubail. The airport occupies an area of about 20 km^{2}.

== Overview ==
Originally constructed by the Royal Commission of Jubail and Yanbu as part of Jubail project, it was meant to be used for commercial aviation until it was decided to utilize the large nearby King Fahd International Airport. Thus, it was handed over to the Ministry of Defence and has been used as a base for the naval aviation group/eastern fleet of the Royal Saudi Navy since then.

However it was recently announced that the airport will be opened for private aviation operations starting September 2014, therefore a project to renovate the airfield was undertaken since some of the airfield's infrastructure was incomplete as a result of the previous change for the use of airport from commercial to military.

== Facilities ==
There is one runway, 4,000 meters long and 45 meters wide. The taxiways however was not completed until recently after announcing the plans of using the airport for private aviation in addition to the current military use.

== Recent activities ==
Due to the accelerating development in Jubail Industrial City and other nearby industrial complexes such as Khurisaniyah and Ras Al-Khair, the airport was handed over to the General Authority of Civil Aviation and will be operated as a civil airport starting from September 2014.

== See also ==
- List of airports in Saudi Arabia
