= Ali Al-Sebaa =

Saudi Arabian actor (born 1951)

Ali Al-Seba على السبع
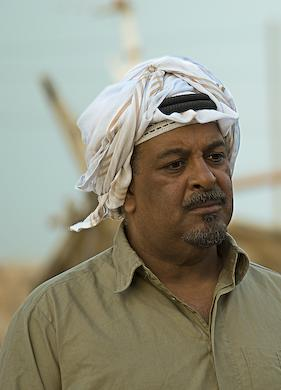
- Born: May 4, 1951 (age 75); Saihat, Saudi Arabia
- Other name: Abu Zuhair
- Occupation: Actor
- Years active: 1974-

Ali Al-Sebaa (Arabic: علي السبع; born May 4, 1951) is a Saudi Arabian actor, best known for his role in the Arabian series Fars Al-Janop. He has won thirty-two awards, including Best Actor of the Year in 1980 from the Culture and Arts Association.

== His first role ==
Al-Sebaa started his acting career in 1974 in Saudi television. His first role was in the series Fars Al-Janop, which also featured Muna Wassef, Adnan Barkat, and Asad Fathah.

== Personal life ==
Al-Sebaa is married and has six children.

== Acting works ==
=== Plays ===
- Anbar Ako billal (English: Anbar's Brother Billal)
- Bayat mn lef (English: House of Life)
- Zwage beljmlah (English: Wholesale Marriage)
- Alkorah Al-motah (English: Illuminated Ball)
- Al-Millionaire (English: Millionaire)

=== Series ===
- Faras AlJanop in 1974 (English: South Knight)
- Juha
- Kaznah (English: Safe)
- Hamath wq helo (English: Sweet and Sour)
- Ayalt Abu Kalash (English: Abu Kalash's Family)
- Al-Shatr Hussan (English: The Excellent Hussan)
- Wagah bin Fhar (English: The Face of bin Fihrh)
- Wadan ya sadiki (English: Goodbye, My Friend)
- Aswar (English: Fences)
- Al-Saknat Fe Klobna (English: The inhabitants in Our Hearts)

=== Movies ===
- Al-Salaef (English: Turtle)
- Alsagip
- Keif al-Hal?
