= Asil Attar =

Iraqi businesswoman

Asil Hussain Attar is an Iraqi businesswoman and talk show host. She is the former CEO of Damas Jewellery.

== Early life and career ==
Asil Attar was born in Baghdad and is from Iraqi, Iranian and Indian heritage. She is a businesswoman in the fashion industry, with industry experience in London, New York, and Europe focused on talent management, brand building, business restructuring, development, and expansion.

Attar was formerly the CEO of Alyasra Fashion, which in 2018 was reported to have over 250 stores across the Middle East.

Attar has been the opening speaker and panelist for conferences in the Middle East region, including Arabian Business Women's Forum, Asian Leadership Awards, Women in Leadership Conference, The Luxury Forum, Cityscape Global, the CSR Summit 2013, the Host for Google Grind Dubai and as a speaker at the World Islamic Economic Forum and their Foundation program the Mocafest. She was on the advisory boards for the Asia Retail Congress and Future Retail. In 2020, she launched "The Turban Thinker", a talk show for entrepreneurs, in which she shared her journey and welcomed guests.

== Awards and recognitions ==
Attar was listed as one of the top 100 most powerful Arab women in 2012 by Arabian Business magazine as well as being voted number 55 in the Forbes Middle East rankings of the most powerful Arabic women in the world.
