= Simon Ourian =

American physician

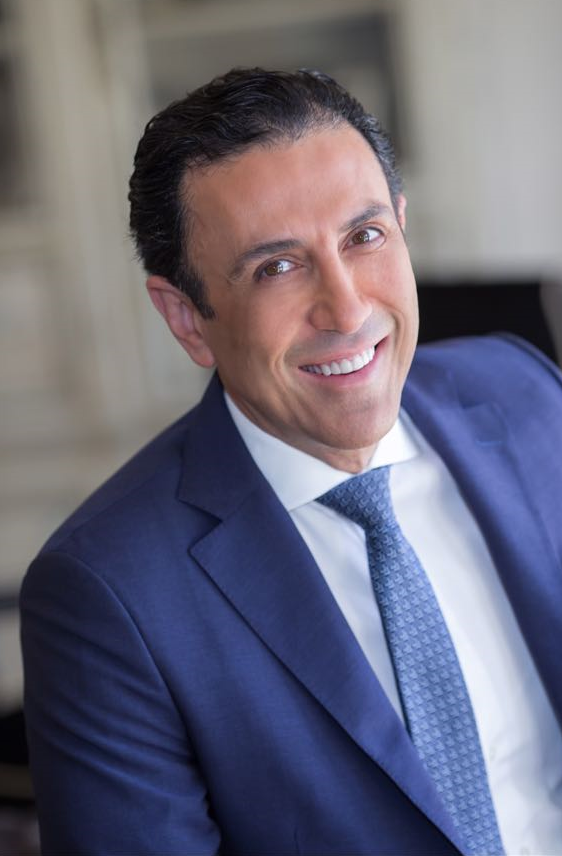
- Born: December 11, 1966 (age 59); Iran
- Education: California State University, Northridge (BS); Wayne State University (MD)
- Medical career
- Field: general practitioner
- Institutions: Epione Beverly Hills

Simon Ourian (born December 11, 1966) is an Iranian American physician who founded Epione Beverly Hills in 1998 in Beverly Hills, California. Ourian is credited for developing the Coolaser and Coolbeam procedures. His clients include the Kardashian-Jenner family, Victoria’s Secret supermodels, Hollywood actors and musicians.

== Early life and education ==
Ourian was born in Iran to a Persian family. He moved to Los Angeles in the 1980s with his parents. His inclination towards cosmetic dermatology started at a young age when he saw the effect of plastic surgery on movie actors.

He received his undergraduate degree in the field of molecular biology from the California State University, Northridge, and his medical degree from Wayne State University in Michigan. Ourian began residency in internal medicine at UCLA, but dropped out in order to pursue a career in aesthetics.

He is married to Sharon Naim Ourian.

== Career ==
Ourian started his own practice. He worked on his techniques and tested non-invasive procedures on himself. Ourian worked with the Fibonacci sequence to study facial elements and patterns.

In 1998, he founded the Epione Beverly Hills. He developed Coolaser for clearing acne and discoloration for darkened skin tone and Coolbeam to get rid of stretch marks. He also created my Vibrata, a tool for minimizing pain, which is used by doctors around the globe. Ourian uses various laser technology and non-invasive aesthetic procedures for the correction or reversal of a variety of conditions.

Ourian developed the Coolaser technology, and it has been used by Olivia Culpo and Kim Kardashian. It involves cooling the treatment area with a special device that emits a series of light pulses across the surface of the skin to stimulate cell repair and collagen growth.

Ourian is the doctor for the entire Kardashian-Jenner clan. He gained popularity when Kim Kardashian acknowledged him as her cosmetic doctor. Ourian has performed several procedures on her sister Kylie Jenner. He has also worked on Malika Haqq, Brandi Maxiell, Miss Colombia, Meghan James, Lady Gaga, beauty YouTuber Nikkie, and Lisa Vanderpump.

Dr. Ourian also operates his own skincare line Epione furthering his dedication to aesthetics providing a comprehensive skincare line that meets his exacting standards.
