= Aseel Omran =

Saudi Arabian actress and singer (born 1989)

- أسيل عمران
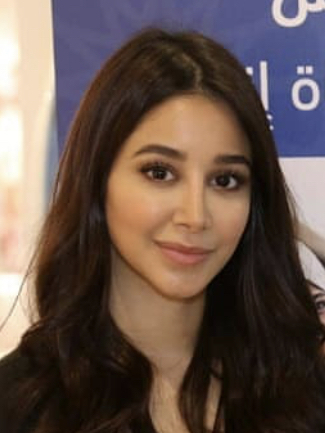
- Saudi Arabian singer and actress
- Born: 12 November 1989 (age 35); Riyadh, Saudi Arabia
- Occupation(s): Singer and actress
- Years active: 2007–present
- Musical career
- Genres: Arabic music
- Labels: Rotana

Aseel Omran (Arabic: أسيل عمران; born 12 November 1989) is a Saudi Arabian singer and actress.

== Early and personal life ==
Omran was born on November 12, 1989, in Riyadh. Her family is from Qatif and she is the sister of presenter Lojain Omran.

== Career ==
Omran first gained popularity through the reality television show Gulf Stars. Omran's young age at the time and baby-face made her the first youth star in Saudi Arabia. On July 25, 2007, Omran released her debut album Khajlanah, which was followed by her second album in 2008 titled Allah Yhannini. It was produced and distributed by the Saudi label Rotana Records.

On September 23, 2010, Omran and her then-husband appeared on the reality show Huwa Wa Heya (He & She), which featured Omran and Al Shaer's day-to-day life. In 2011, she released her third album titled Mo Bessahel. On June 9, 2016, in collaboration with RedOne, Omran released a music video of "Don't You Need Somebody". The song catapulted Omran to the top of Arabic music charts.

== Discography ==
=== Studio albums ===
- 2007: Khajlanah
- 2008: Allah Yhannini
- 2011: Mo Bessahel

== Acting works ==
=== Series ===
- Akoon Aw La (2012) MBC Production
