= Saad Al Faraj =

Kuwaiti actor

Saad Al Faraj سعد الفرج
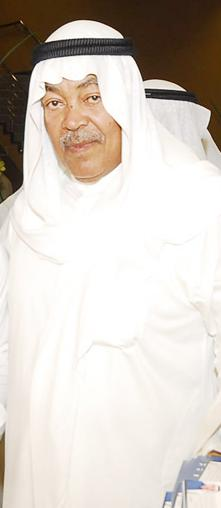
- Born: September 15, 1938 (age 86); Kuwait
- Occupation: Actor
- Years active: 1958–present

Saad Al Faraj (Arabic: سعد الفرج; born September 15, 1938) is a Kuwaiti actor.

== Works ==
=== Plays ===
- 24-hour (1967)
- bny samit (1975)
- ala al makshof (1996)

=== Series TV ===
- darb al zaliq (1977)
- soq al miqaqis (2000)
- eial al faqar (2007)

=== Movies ===
- bas ya bahar (1971)
- al sidra (2001)
- Tora Bora (2011)
- Hami Aldiyar-The Documentary (2017)
- On Borrowed Time (2018)
