= Royal Commission for Jubail and Yanbu =

Government agency of Saudi Arabia

Kingdom of Saudi Arabia Royal Commission for Jubail and Yanbu (RCJY)
- الهيئة الملكية للجبيل وينبع
- RCJY logo's

Agency overview
- Formed: 1975
- Headquarters: Riyadh Jubail & Yanbu (Saudi Arabia)
- Agency executives: Abdullah Al Sadaan, President; Engr. Mustafa Al-Mahdi, CEO of Royal Commission at Jubail; Dr.Fahad Al-Qurashi, CEO for the Royal Commission at Yanbu
- Website: www.rcjy.gov.sa

The Royal Commission for Jubail and Yanbu (RCJY) was established on 21 September 1975, as an autonomous organization of the Saudi Arabian Government. The commission is governed by a board of directors and its chairman reports to the Council of Ministers. The chairman's office in Riyadh formulates policies and oversees implementation through two Directorates General; one in Jubail and the other in Yanbu.

== Foundation ==
Logo of the Royal Commission for Jubail and Yanbu until 2024

In 1975 (1395H) and as a part of the second development plan, the Kingdom of Saudi Arabia laid down a development strategy that aims to diversify economy and to minimize dependence on raw oil income. A historical strategic decision was made to support and expand its industry base represented in the Royal Decree No. M/75 which directed the foundation of the Royal Commission for Jubail and Yanbu on 21 September 1975 as an administrative and financial independent organization run by a board of directors whose chairman reports directly to the Council of Ministers. The first secretary general of the Royal Commission established by King Khalid was Abdullah bin Faisal bin Turki. Policies are laid down by the Royal Commission's headquarters in Riyadh and are executed through the directorates general of both Jubail and Yanbu Industrial Cities.

== Mission ==
The mission of the RCJY is to: "Plan, promote, develop and manage Petrochemicals and Energy intensive industrial cities through successful customer focus and partnerships with investors, employees, communities and other stakeholders." These industrial cities are Jubail, Yanbu, Ras Al-Khair and the newest project Jazan.

== Objectives of The Royal Commission ==
- Stop wasting gas associated with oil extraction and commissioning Saudi Aramco collecting and processing, and transportation to all of Jubail and Yanbu to be used as feedstock for the petrochemical industry.
- Establishing Saudi Basic Industries Corporation (SABIC) to create petrochemical plants benefit from the gas and raise its added value.
- The establishment of the Royal Commission for Jubail and Yanbu and the planning and implementation of the industrial cities of Jubail and Yanbu as one of the most important development projects in the giant Kingdom, where represent the economic dimension to attract local and foreign investments in the industrial field, and fathom new horizons for sustainable development.
- Urban planning cities of Jubail, Yanbu and Ras Alkheer mining.
- Construction, operation and maintenance of infrastructure, and provision of public services, and the development of social development to support industrial compilers both cities.
- Rehabilitation of national cadres necessary for the management and operation of industrial cities.
- Encourage the private sector to invest in the two cities.
- Human resource development and population.
- Protection of the environment.
