= Aseel Hameem =

Iraqi singer

Aseel Hameem أصيل هميم
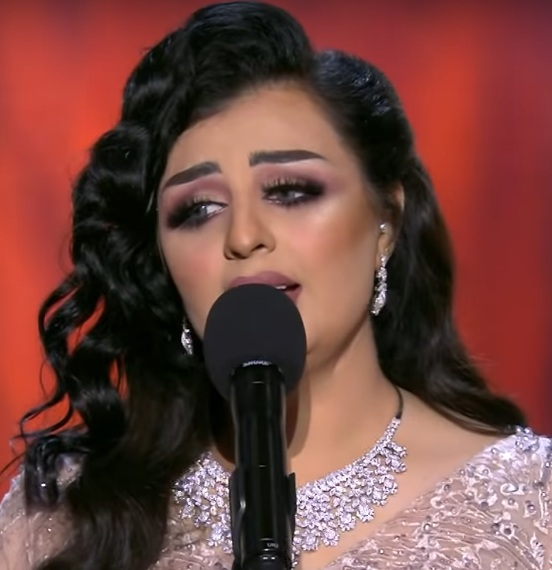
- Hameem performing at Souq Wagif Festival in 2019

Background information
- Born: Aseel Karim Hameem أصيل كريم هميم; 6 October 1984 (age 41); Adhamiyah, Baghdad, Iraq
- Genres: Arabic music
- Occupation: Singer
- Years active: 2007–present
- Website: https://www.aseelhmeem.com

Aseel Karim Hameem (Arabic: أصيل كريم هميم; born 6 October 1984) is an Iraqi singer. She started her professional career at the age of twenty two and has released various songs in collaboration with other artists. Hameem has also voiced the theme songs for multiple Arabic TV series. As of August 2020, her song "Ser Alhayah" is the most streamed song on YouTube by a female Arab artist with more than 255 million views.

== Life and career ==
Her father, Karim Hameem, is also a musician. She was a contestant in the Arab Stars (Arabic: نجوم العرب) program on MBC 1 with the Arab Mashreq team. She released her first solo song entitled "Balani Zemani" shortly afterwards. She has since released songs with different Arabic dialects.

== Discography ==
- Balani Zemani
- Atali3 Bel3eon
- Mn Mata
- Akher Zahour
- Qahar
- Ya Hala
- Betewhashny
- Asfer
- Al Soura
- Rouhi (2015)
- Ehsas Hobk (2016)
- Melyon Khater (2017)
- Wesh Mesawe
- Mahou Haki (2018)
- Khalk Bahr (2018)
- Of Menh Galbi (2018)
- Gad El Ata (2018)
- Al Kalam (2018)
- 3ala Bali (2019)
- Almafroth (2019)
- Hawa Baghdad (2019)
- Ser Alhayah (2019)
- Enta Al Saadah (2020)
- Enta Kolshay (2020)
- Zorouf (2020)
- Yeshbahak Galbi (2020)
- Ehfaz Shakli (2021)
- Loqyak (2021)
- Shkad Helw (2021)
- Eii Enta (2022)

=== TV series soundtrack ===
- 2008: Shara Alnufus
- 2011: Banat Sokar Banat
- 2012: Akoon Aw La
- 2013: Tawali Al-Lail
- 2019: Hawa Baghdad
- 2019: Ahly W Nasy
- 2019: Kan Khaled
- 2021: Tigris and Euphrates
- 2022: Almas Maksoor
- 2022: Raheeq
