= Jubail =

Jubail الجبيل
- City
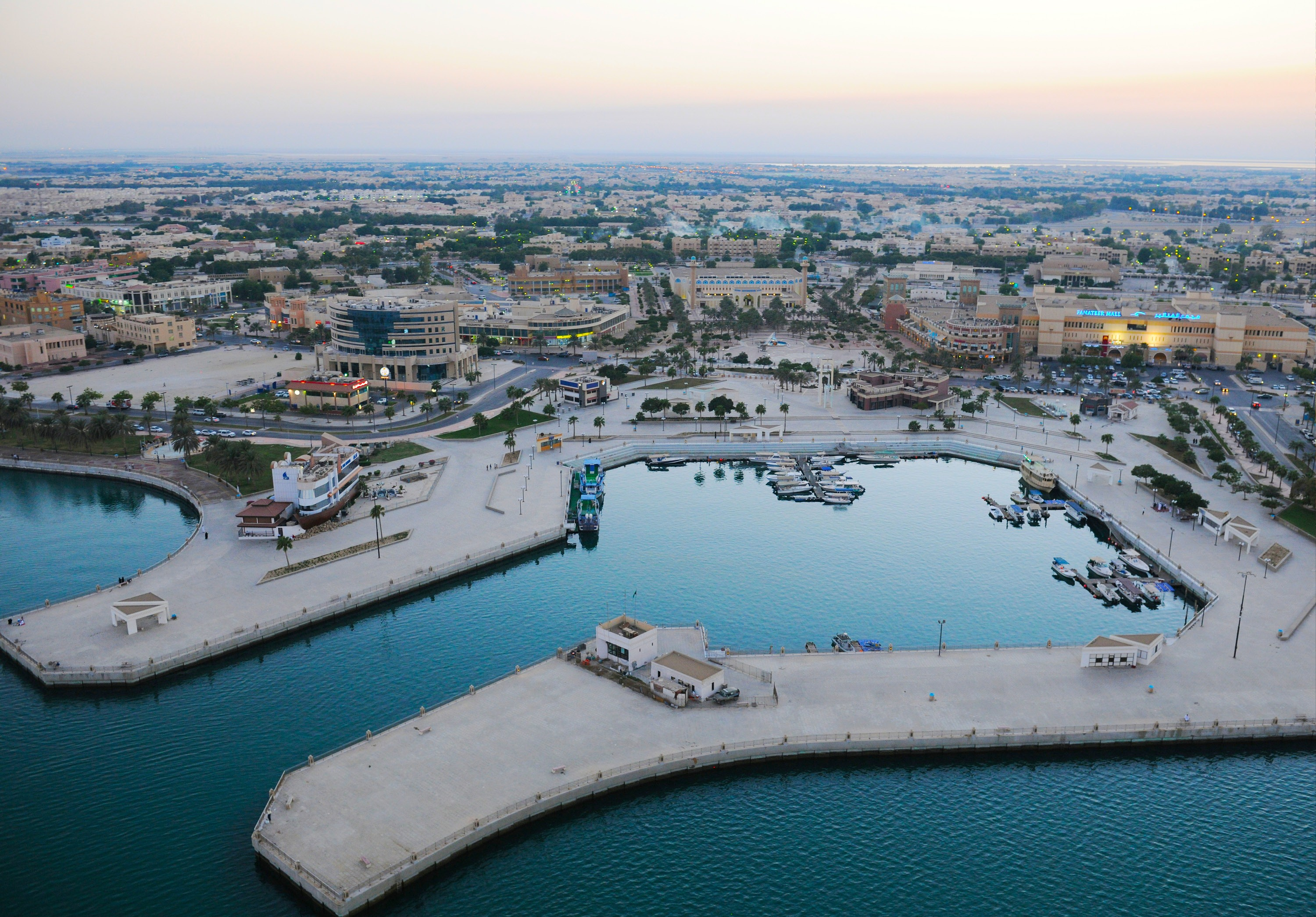
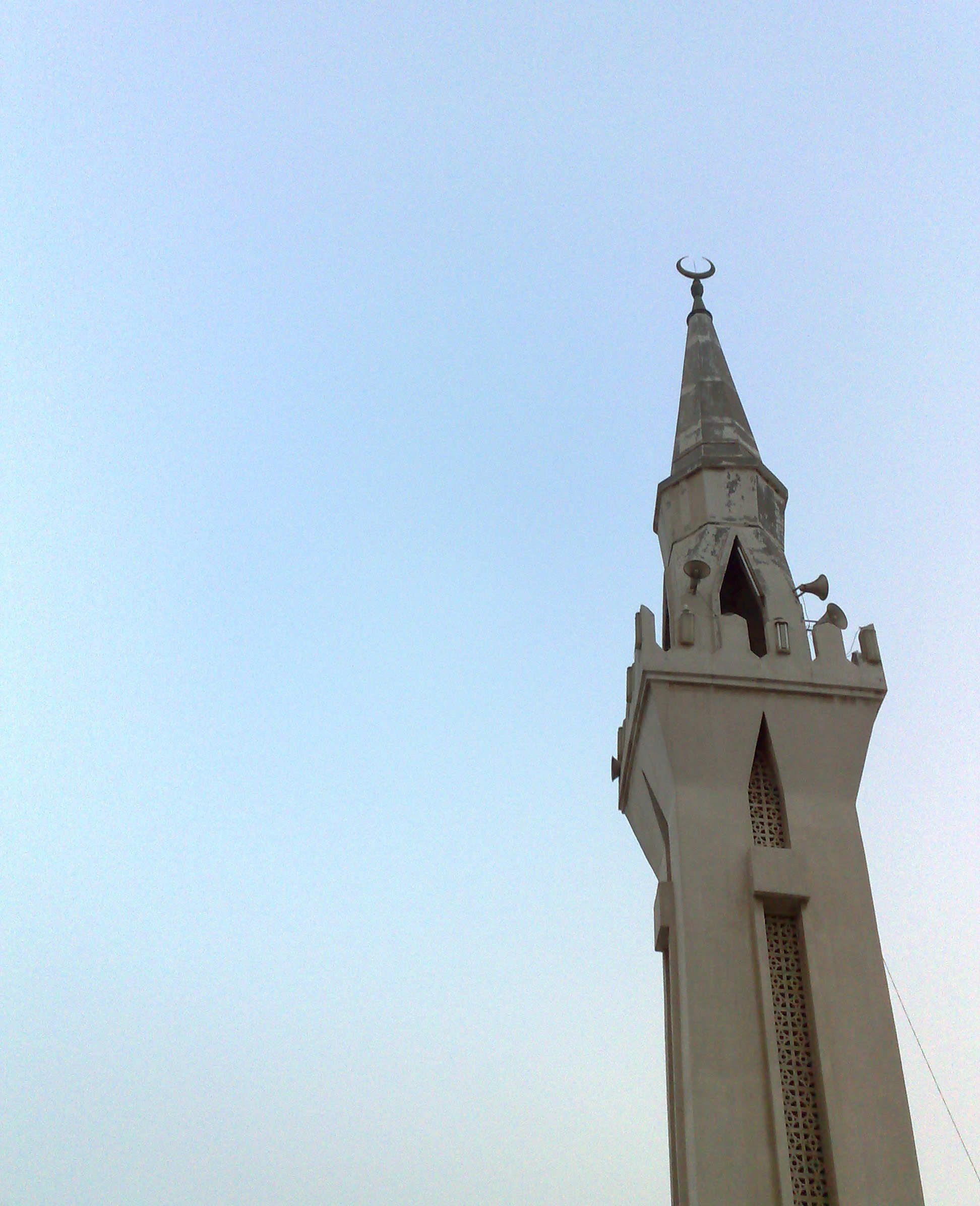
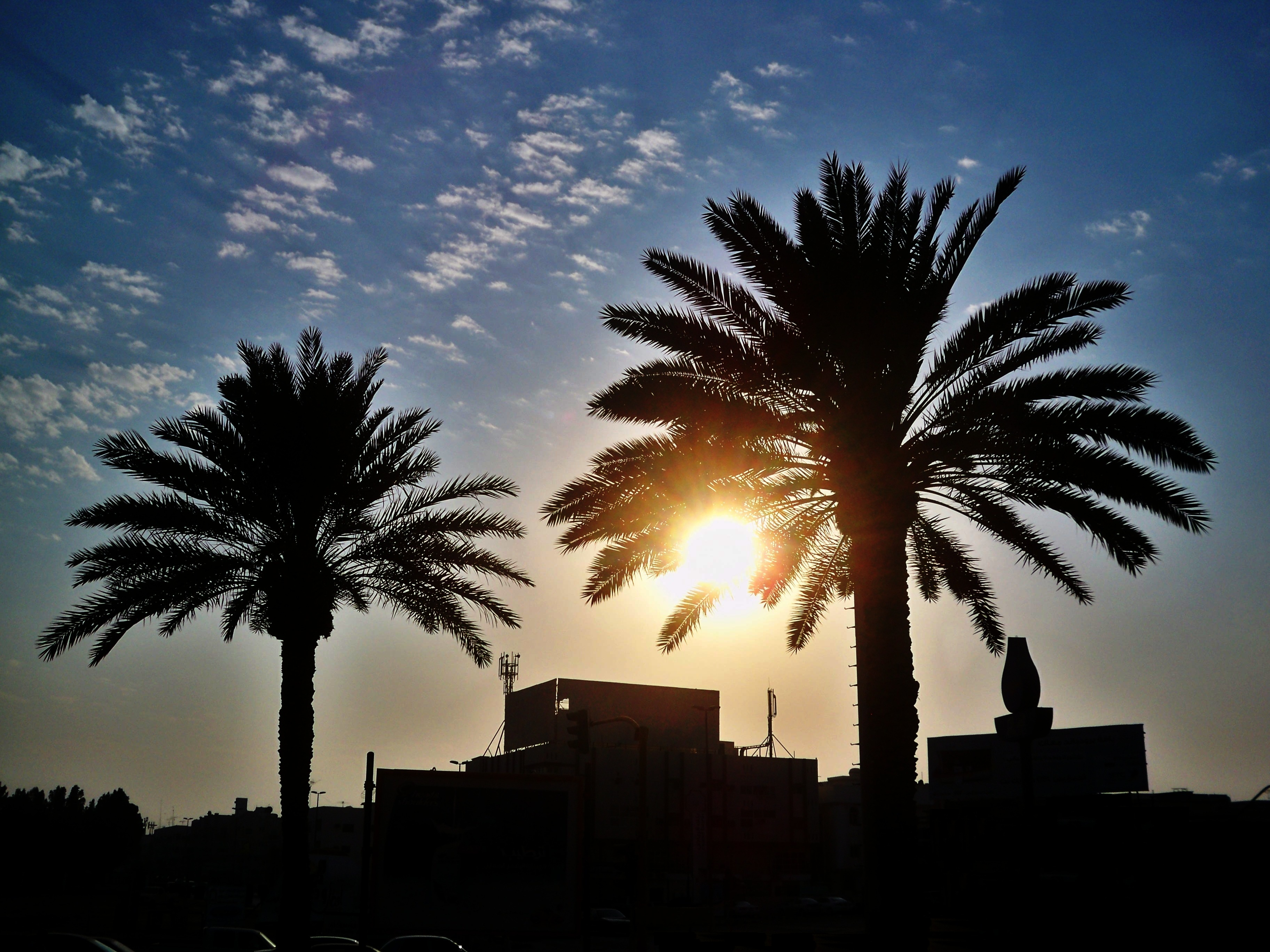
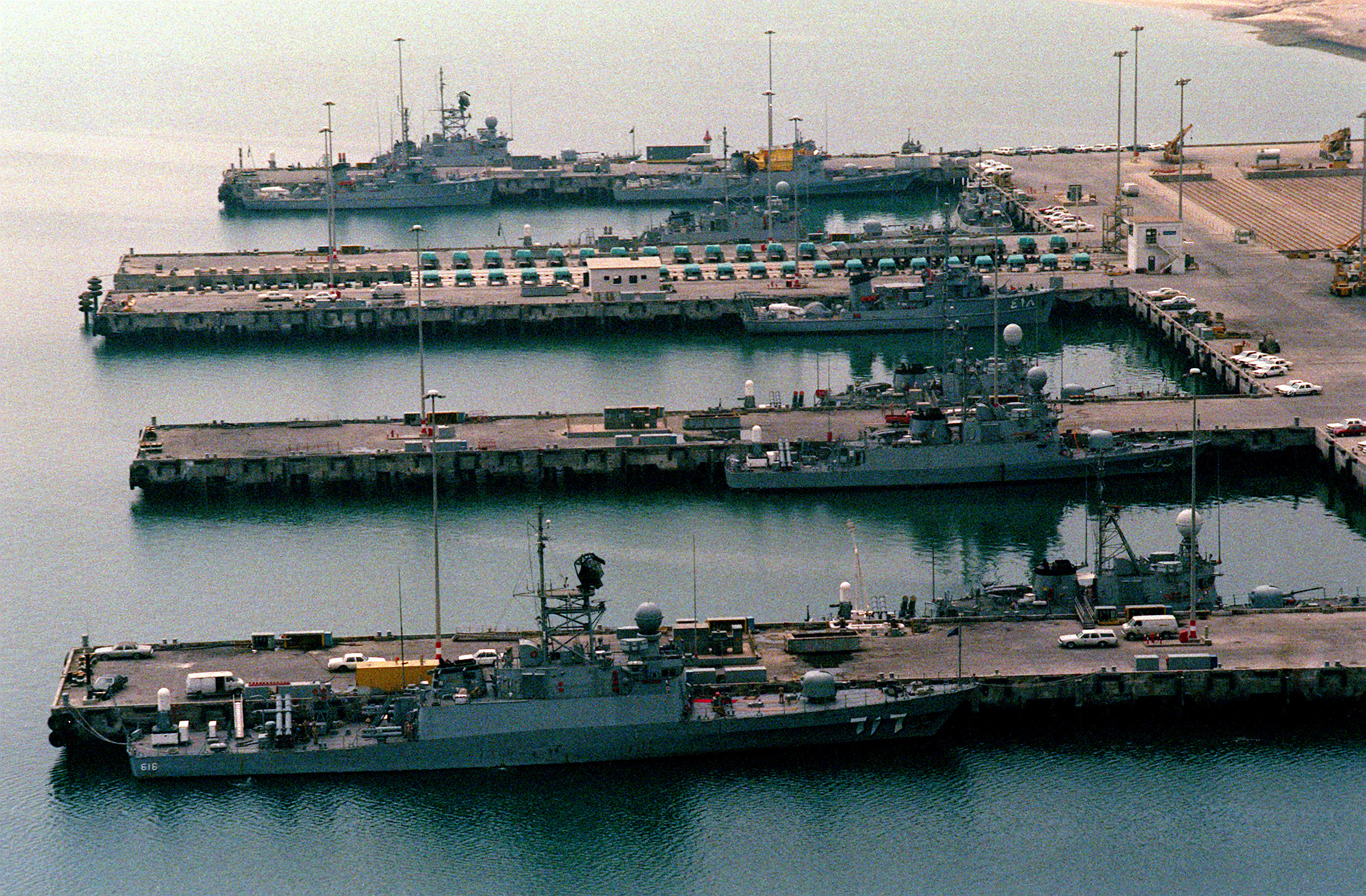
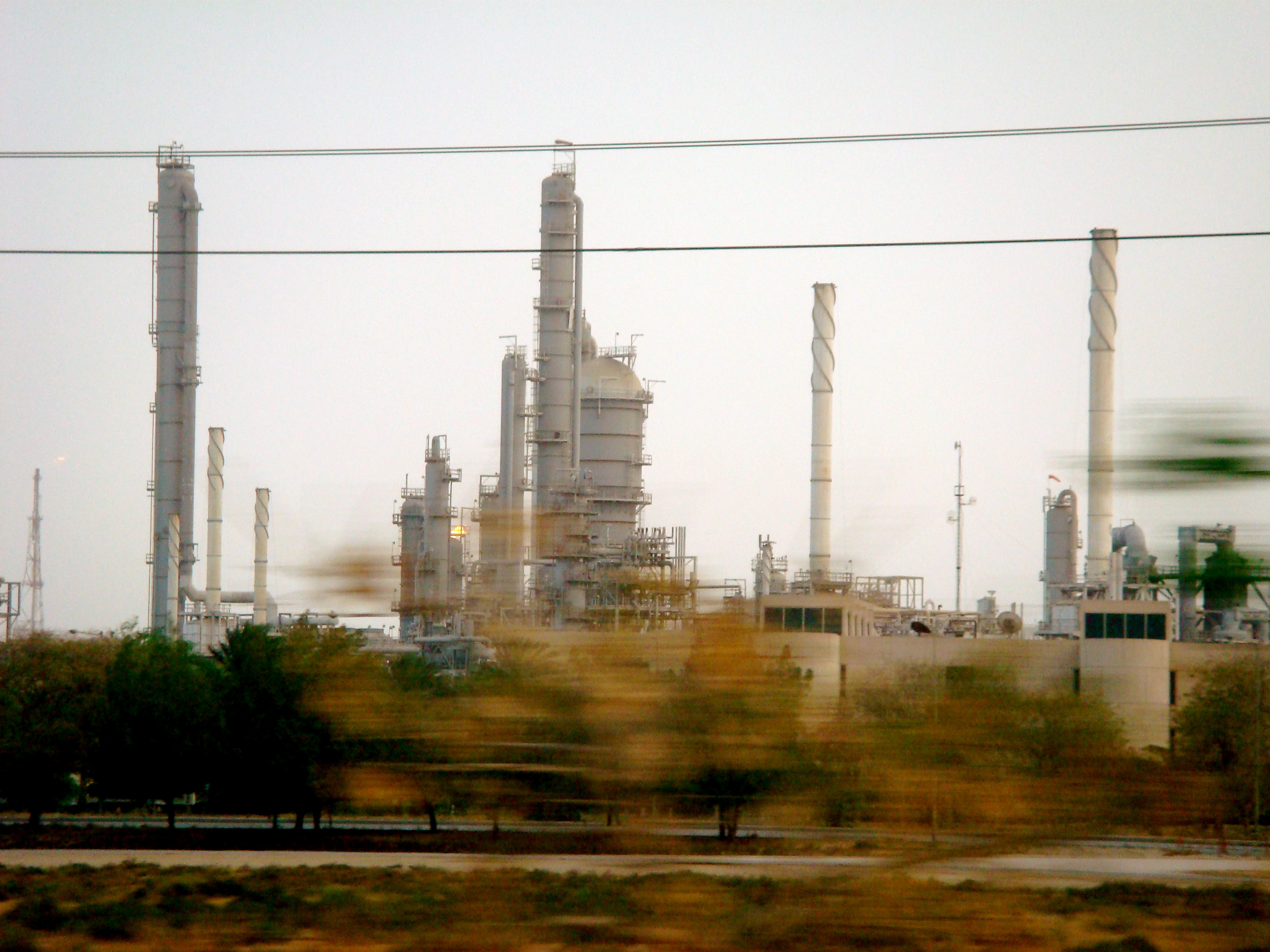

- Location within Saudi Arabia
- Coordinates: 27°00′00″N 49°39′16″E
- Country: Saudi Arabia
- Province: Eastern Province

Government
  - Type: Monarchy
  - Provincial Governor: Saud bin Nayef

Population (2022)
  - City: 474,679
  - Metro: 505,162 (Jubail governorate)
  - Nationality (2011): 73% Saudi; 17% Indian; 4% Filipinos; 3% Pakistanis; 1% Bangladeshis; 1% Americans; 1% Europeans; 2.5% Other countries
- Time zone: UTC+3 (AST)
- Postal code: 31961
- Website: www.aljubail.city

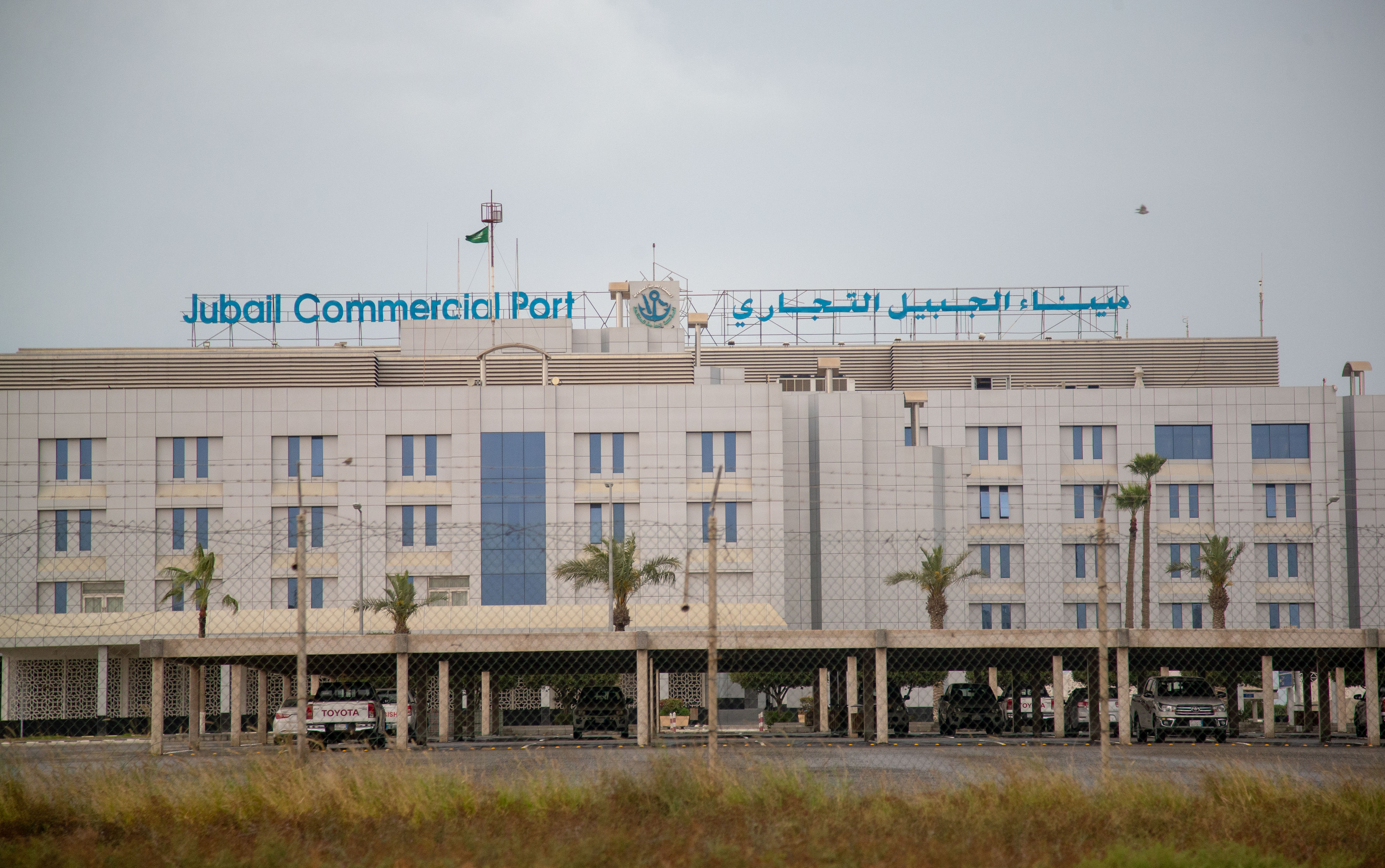
Jubail commercial port

Jubail (Arabic: الجبيل, Al Jubayl) is an industrial city in the Eastern province on the Persian Gulf of Saudi Arabia. It is the third most-populous city in the province, after the capital, Dammam, and Al Hofuf. With a total population of 474,679 as of 2022, it is Saudi Arabia’s 11th most-populous city. It is home to the Middle East's largest and world's fourth largest petrochemical company SABIC. It has the world's largest IWPP (Independent Water and Power Project) producing 2,743.6 MW of electricity and 800,000 m^{3} of water daily.

Jubail comprises the Old Town of Al Jubail (Jubail Balad), which was a small fishing village until 1975, and the Industrial Area. Jubail Industrial City is the largest civil engineering project in the world today. In 1975, the Saudi government designated Jubail as the site for a new industrial city, with rapid expansion and industrialization arising. The new industrial and residential areas were named Madīnat al Jubayl aṣ Ṣinā`īyah (Jubail Industrial City). The 2005 Census Report for Jubail Industrial City estimates the population at 224,430 residents.

== History ==
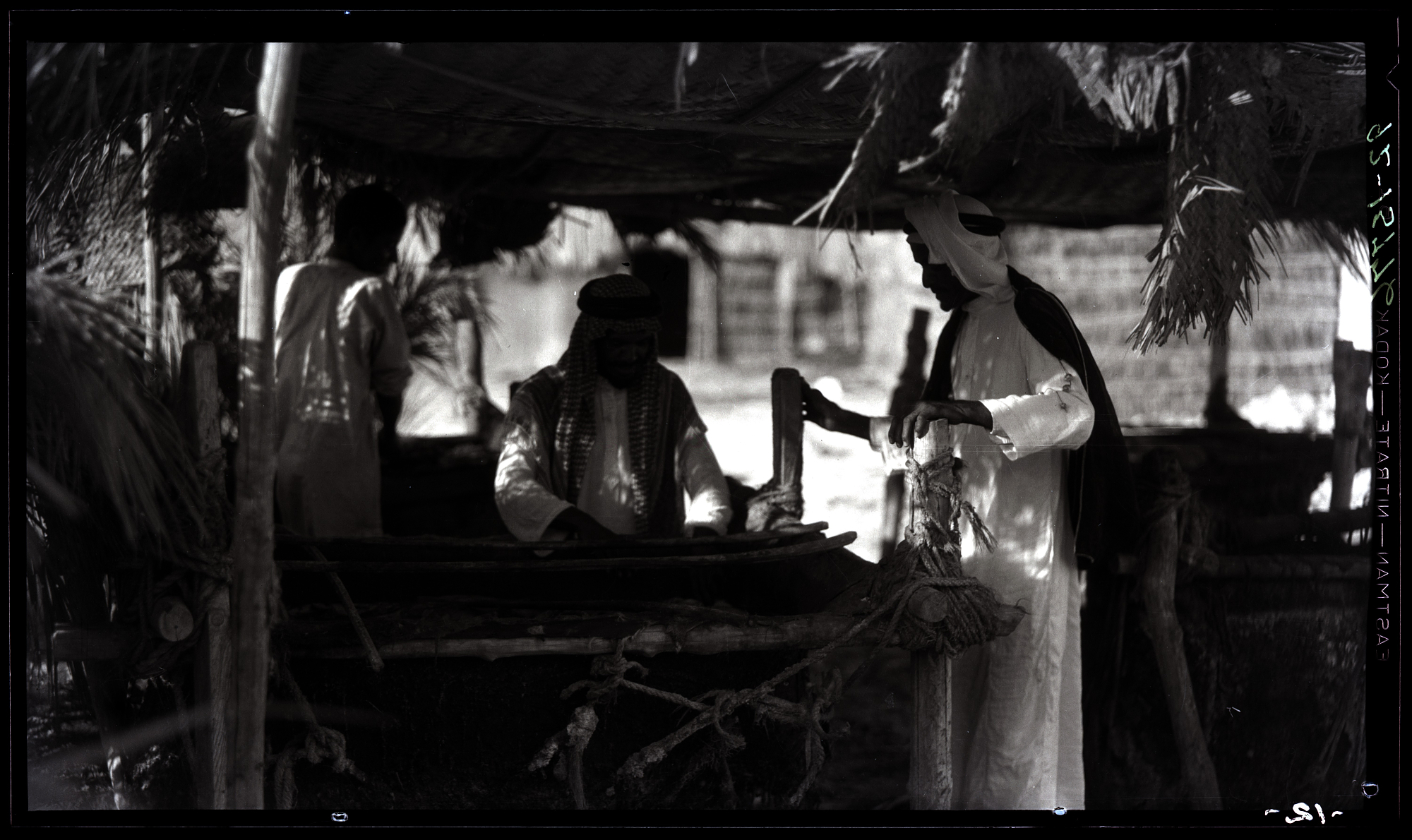
Tanning in Jubail, 1934

The town of Al-Jubail, on the Persian Gulf coast of the Kingdom of Saudi Arabia, has ancient roots. Human habitation dates back at least 7,000 years, when the people of Dilmun — whose civilization radiated up and down the coast of the Persian Gulf — established a settlement there. Archaeological place: Crease Tower or Tuwayah Tower was constructed around 1928. It was key source of water for Jubail. In September 1933, Jubail gained a measure of fame as the landing site for the first team of geologists to explore for oil in Saudi Arabia.

The origins of Jubail date back to the early Islamic period when it was known as 'Aynayn (Arabic: عينين), meaning "two springs." The settlement was known for its sweet water springs, date palm groves, and its status as a cultural and literary center.

At some point, the original settlement of 'Aynayn was abandoned. The modern town of Jubail was established around 1911 and became a center for fishing and pearling. The town came under Saudi rule in 1913 when King 'Abd al-Aziz regained the al-Hasa Province.

=== 1930s ===
Jubail experienced economic challenges during the 20th century. The global economic depression and the rise of Japan’s cultured pearl industry in the 1930s caused a decline in the traditional pearling trade, which had been a key industry for the town. At its peak, Jubail had supported over 200 pearling boats, but this number rapidly dwindled as cultured pearls became dominant.

The arrival of oil exploration teams in the 1930s briefly revitalized the town. Jubail was chosen as a base for early geological surveys due to its harbor, freshwater springs, and favorable terrain. On September 23, 1933, geologists from Standard Oil Company of California, including Robert Miller, Schuyler "Krug" Henry, and Karl Twitchell, arrived in Jubail to conduct exploratory work. However, as oil exploration activities shifted to Dhahran and Khobar, Jubail reverted to being a minor fishing center.

=== Modern development ===
Prior to its industrial transformation, Jubail was primarily a fishing community. As of 1972, the town boasted a fishing fleet of approximately 160 boats, with catches including shrimp and small sharks that were renowned as far as Kuwait and Riyadh.

Jubail's transformation began in the early 1970s when the Saudi government initiated plans to develop it into a major industrial city. This initiative was part of a broader strategy to diversify the Kingdom's economy and leverage its vast natural gas reserves. Jubail was selected as the site for a massive industrial complex due to its strategic location and existing infrastructure.

The city's redevelopment included the construction of refineries, petrochemical plants, steel mills, aluminum facilities, and desalination plants. To support this industrialization, extensive infrastructure was developed, including new ports, roads, pipelines, and an airport. Thousands of workers were relocated to Jubail to operate the facilities, and the city was redesigned to accommodate the growing population.

Today, Jubail is home to the Jubail Industrial City, one of the world's largest petrochemical industrial hubs, managed by the Royal Commission for Jubail and Yanbu. It is a cornerstone of Saudi Arabia's industrial and economic strategy, contributing significantly to the country's non-oil exports.

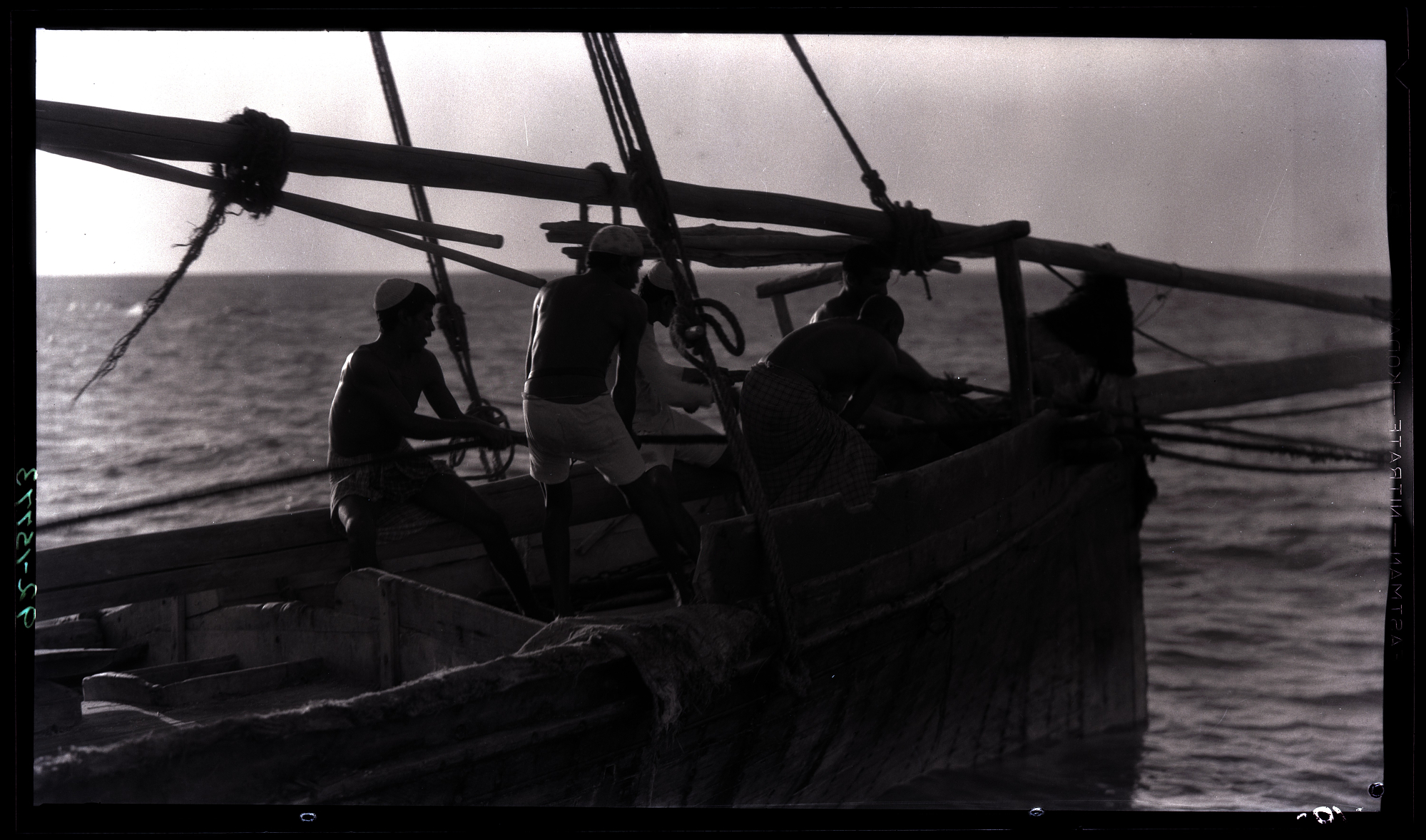
Sailboat in Jubail, 1935

Iran targeted Jubail for strikes in the 2026 Iran War.

== Jubail Industrial City ==
It is the world's largest industrial city established in 1975. It covers 1,016 square kilometers and includes industrial complexes, major harbour and port facilities. It contributes to about 7% of Saudi Arabia's GDP.

Bechtel began work on the Jubail Industrial City project more than 40 years ago and is still working in Jubail now. Bechtel has managed the Jubail project since it began in the mid-1970s, and in 2004 the Royal Commission for Jubail and Yanbu asked the company to manage Jubail II, a $3.8 billion expansion of the city's industrial and residential areas.

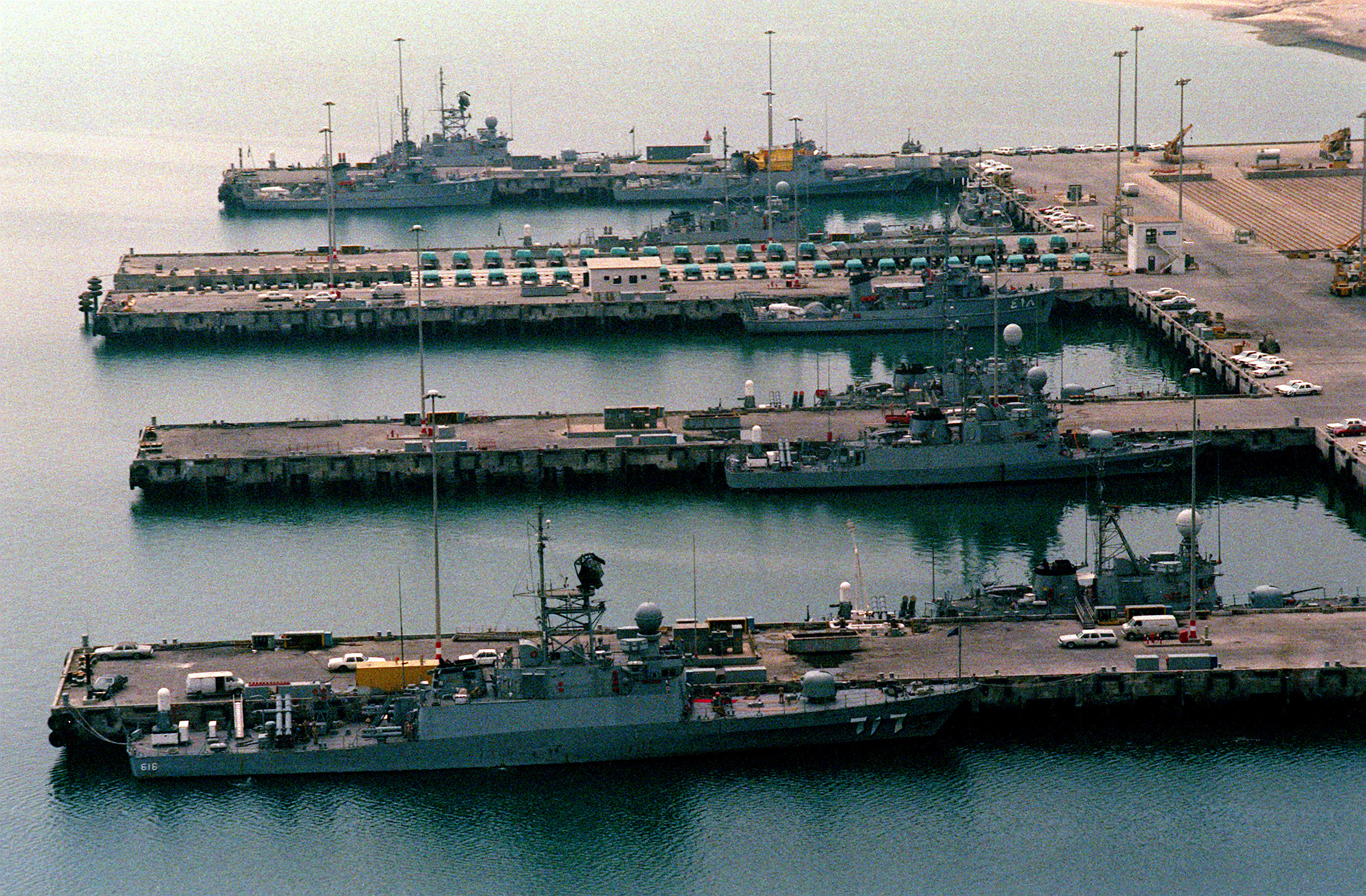
King Abdul-Aziz Naval Base

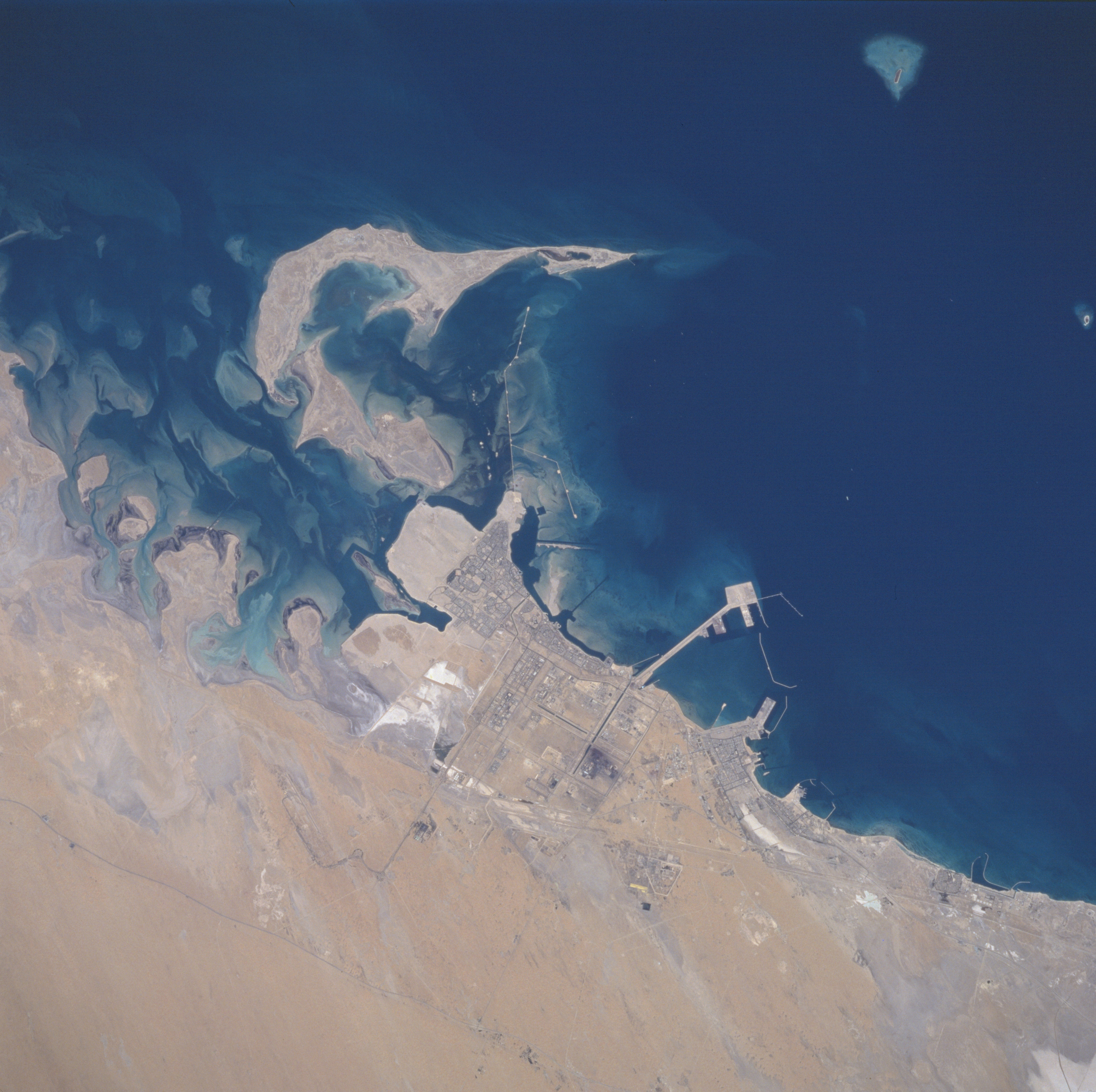
Jubail from space, June 1996

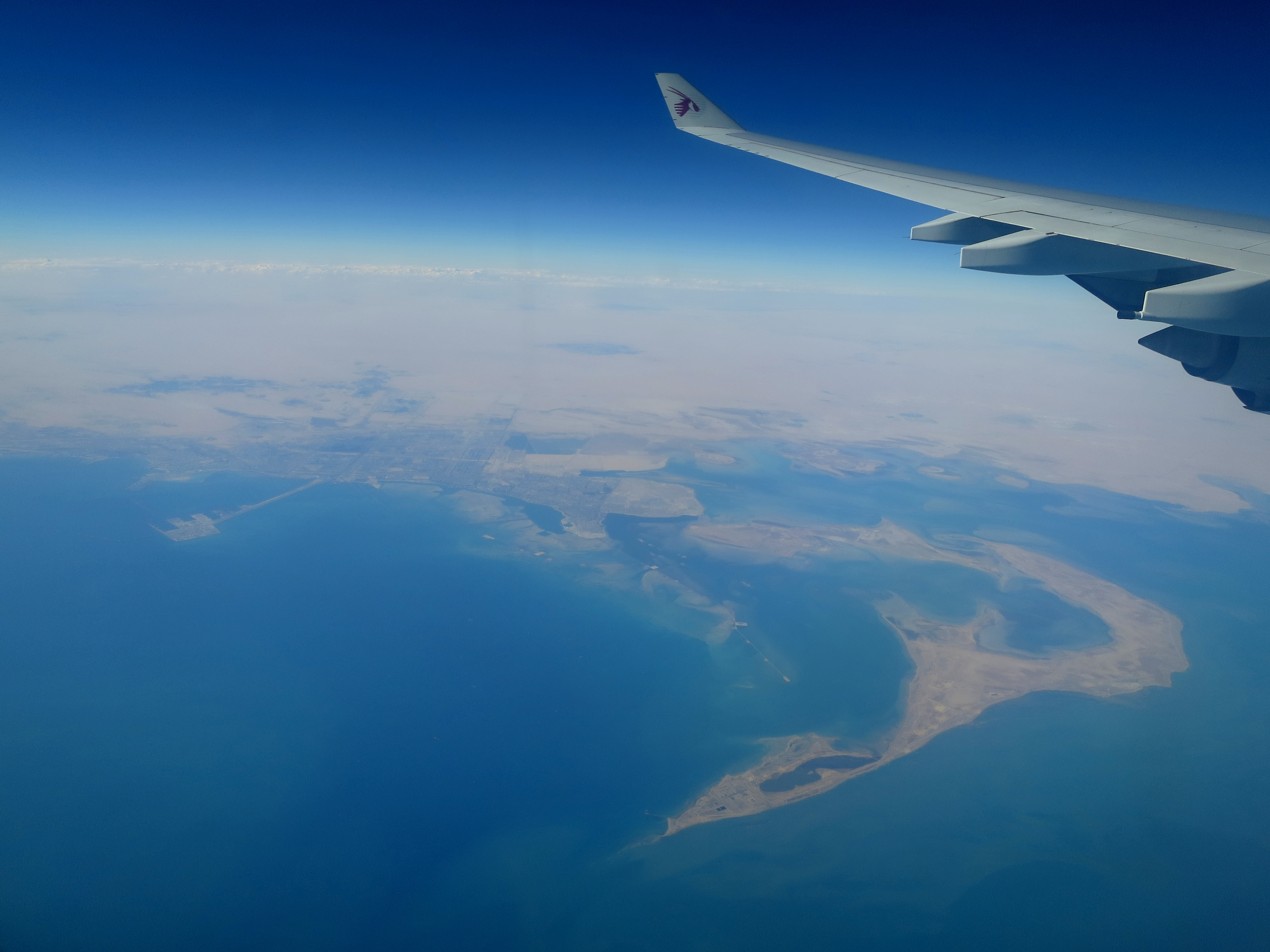
Aerial view November 2014

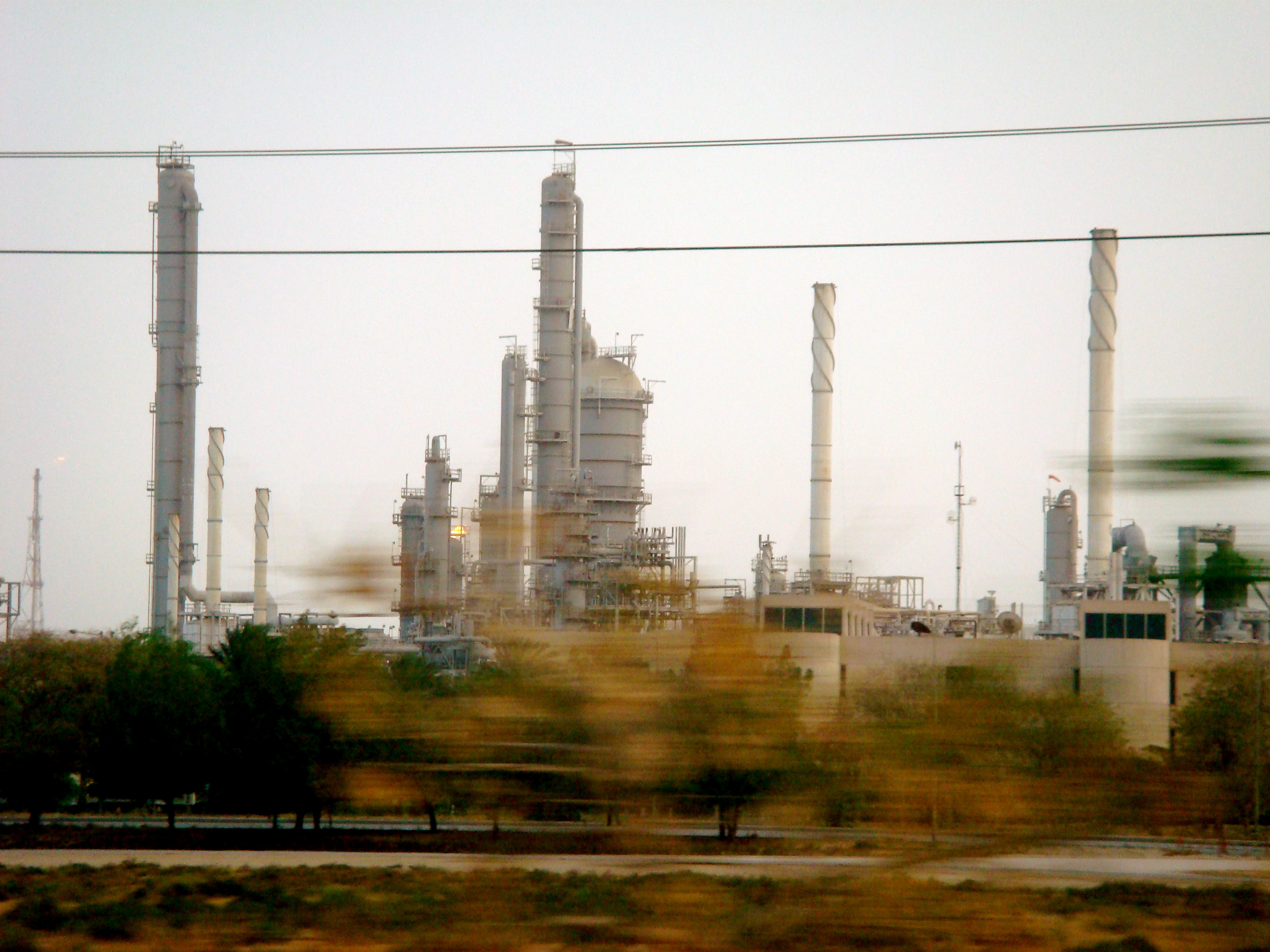
Factories in Jubail

Al-Fanateer Corniche in Jubail Industrial City

== Transportation ==
=== Highway ===
Jubail is directly connected with other cities by two major highways; Dhahran-Jubail Highway and Abu Hadriyah Highway.

One ongoing project is the Jubail-Qassim (Buraidah) Expressway 500 km (310 mi), which will reduce the distance between Jubail and Qassim (Buraidah) to around 331 km (206 mi) from the current 831 km (516 mi).

=== Railway ===
A branch of the Saudi Landbridge Project railway is proposed to connect Jubail to Dammam.

=== Seaport ===
There are two seaports in Jubail—the Jubail Commercial Seaport and the King Fahd Industrial Seaport. As of 2011, Jubail ranks 92nd in the world in terms of Total Cargo Volume with 44,700 tons.

=== Airport ===
The city is served by King Fahd International Airport.

Jubail Naval Airport is an airfield 25 kilometres (16 mi) west of Jubail City, near the industrial area. Originally constructed by the Royal Commission of Jubail and Yanbu as part of Jubail project, it was meant to be used for commercial aviation until it was decided to utilize the large nearby King Fahd International Airport. Thus, it was handed over to the Ministry of Defence and has been used as a base for the naval aviation group/eastern fleet of the Royal Saudi Navy since then. The terminal in Dammam Airport is about 60 km drive from the suburbs of Jubail, 80 km from the city center and 100 km from the Royal Commission neighborhoods.

However it was recently announced that the airport will be opened for private aviation operations starting September 2014. A project to renovate the airfield was undertaken since some of the airfield's infrastructure was incomplete, as a result of the previous change for the use of airport from commercial to military. To date, the project and renovations have not been completed.

In addition, two other airfields are located in the city; Abu Ali Airport is located in the Island of Abu Ali while the other is located in King Abdulaziz Naval Base.

== Main sights ==
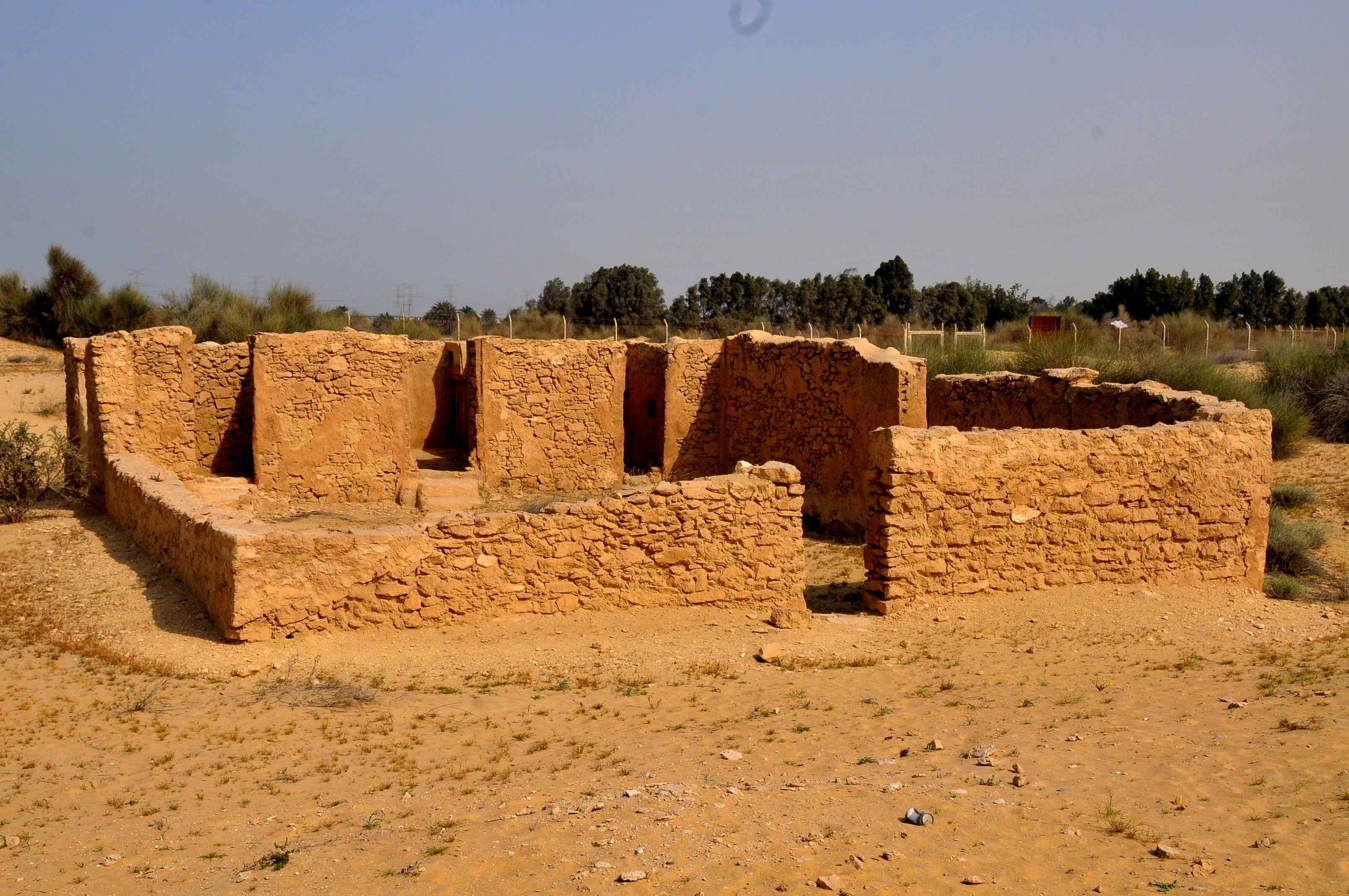
Ruins of Jubail Church, an ancient (4th-century) Nestorian church building near Jubail

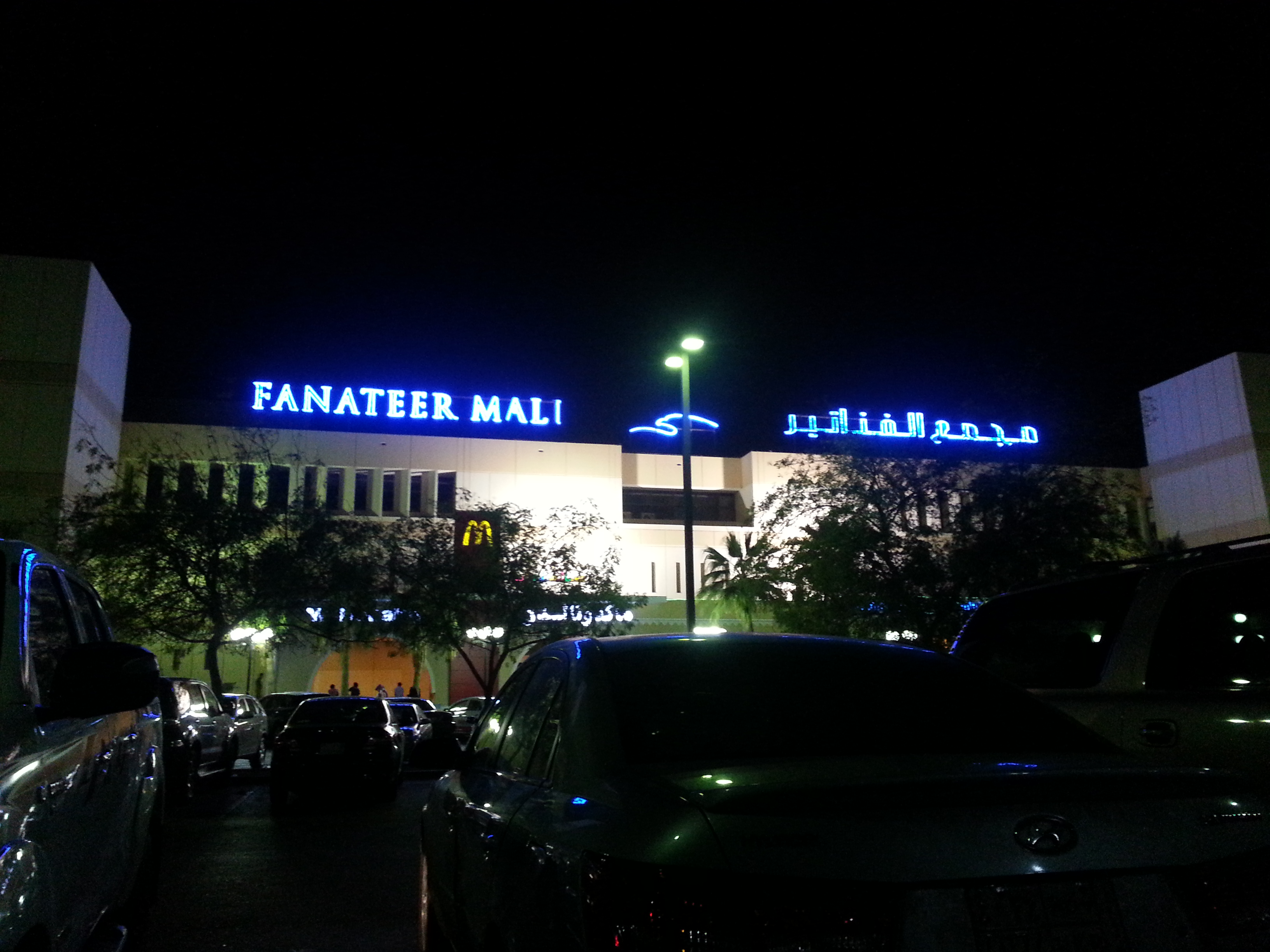
Fanateer Mall at night, 2013

Jubail has a robust market place, known as International Market. It also has several malls, such as Fanateer Mall, Galleria Mall, Jubail Center Mall, Fanateer Beach, City Max, Hyper-Panda, Panda, Banana Beach, Jubail Centre, Home Center, Red Tag, Centrepoint, Jalmudah Hills, Jubail Plaza, Jubail RTV Riding Arena and Jubail Mall.

=== Beaches ===
- Jubail Beach 27.009401°N 49.667760°E
- Al Jubail Corniche 27.036733°N 49.637234°E
- Youth Beach 27.086615°N 49.588674°E
- Al Nakheel Beach 27.117686°N 49.572271°E
- Fanateer Beach 27.144392°N 49.567130°E
- Dareen Beach 27.174105°N 49.569877°E
- Banana Beach

The Jubail desalination plant

As part of the industrial city, Jubail has a desalination plant called Saline Water Conversion Corp. (SWCC). In 2019, SWCC hit Guinness World Record as the largest producer of desalinated water worldwide. The plant hit the record as it produces 5.6 million cubic meters every day.

== Education ==
=== Schools ===
- Jubail International School
- Al Abna'a Schools
- Mariya international School
- Dunes International School
- Al Moattasem International School
- Hafeez International School
- International Indian School, Al- Jubail (IIS Jubail)
- ISG Jubail
- Jubail Academy International School
- King Fahd High School
- Pakistan International School
- Al Murjan Elementary School
- Al Ahsa Secondary School
- Andalus Elementary School
- Dana Elementary School
- Fanatir Elementary School
- Fayha Elementary School
- Khaleeg Intermediate School
- Al Deffi Secondary School
- Najd Secondary School
- Umm Alqurra Secondary School
- Zaid Bin Amr Elementary School

=== Universities and colleges ===
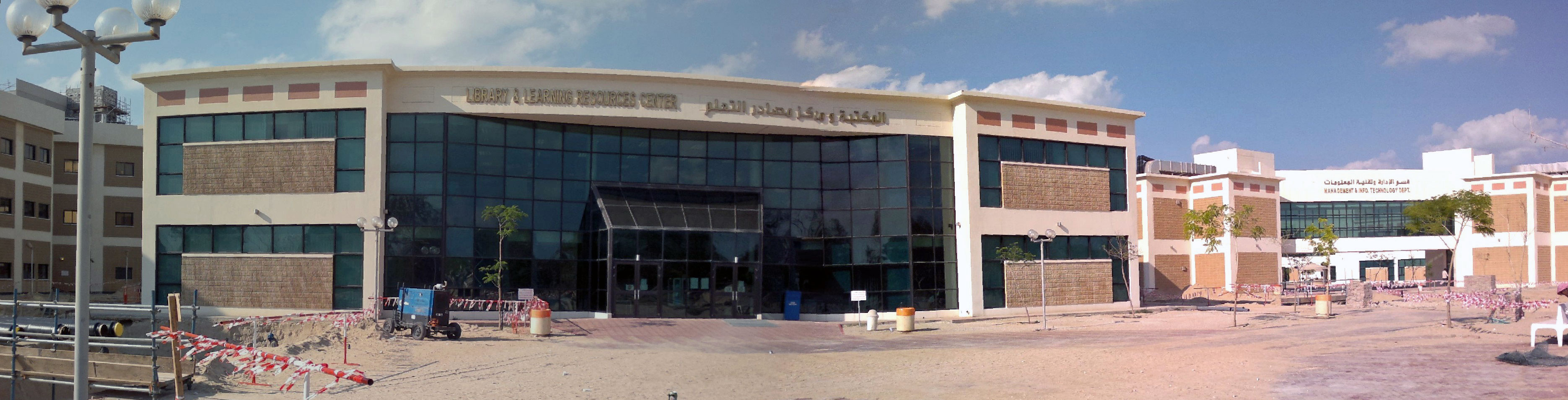
Jubail Industrial College

- Jubail Industrial College
- Jubail Technical Institute
- Jubail University College

== Hospitals, dispensaries and dental centers ==
- Al Fanateer Hospital
- Mohammed Suleiman Al Khonaini Medical Complex
- Al Khonaini Medical Complex
- Al-Fayadh Medical Clinic
- Al-Hijailan Medical Clinic
- Al-Shabani General Hospital
- Al-Shifa Hospital
- Almana General Hospital
- Almana Medical Center
- Al Naba Medical Complex
- Ar Razi Clinic
- Armed Forces Hospital
- Badr Al Khaleej Medical Center
- Danat Al Sahraa Medical Company (KIMS)
- Dina Dispensary for Medical Services
- Gulf Asian Medical Center
- Huda Younis Dental Complex
- Jubail General Hospital
- Jubail Medical Center (Mutlaq Al Otaibi Medical Service Group)
- Jubail National Dispensary
- KIMS Medical Center
- Kingdom Dental Medical Dispensary
- Lulu Dispensary
- Lulu Hospital
- Mayo Dental Center
- Mouwasat Hospital
- Ram Dental Complex
- Royal Commission Hospital

== Distances to nearby places ==
=== Eastern Province ===
- Safwa city: 56 km (35 mi)
- Qatif: 64 km (40 mi)
- Ras Tanura: 71 km (44 mi)
- Saihat: 76 km (47 mi)
- Dammam: 96 km (60 mi)
- Khobar: 104 km (65 mi)
- Abqaiq: 160 km (99 mi)
- Al-Ahsa: 222 km (138 mi)

=== Other provinces ===
- Riyadh: 510 km (320 mi)
- Buraydah: 768 km (477 mi)
- Arar: 967 km (601 mi)
- Ha'il: 938 km (583 mi)
- Medina: 1,263 km (785 mi)
- Mecca: 1,333 km (828 mi)
- Jeddah: 1,418 km (881 mi)

=== Other cities of Eastern Arabia ===
- (Bahrain) Manama: 166 km (103 mi)
- Kuwait City: 342 km (213 mi)
- (Qatar) Doha: 496 km (308 mi)
- (United Arab Emirates) Abu Dhabi: 865 km (537 mi)
- (United Arab Emirates) Dubai: 977 km (607 mi)
- (Oman) Muscat: 1,374 km (854 mi)

== Climate ==
Jubail has a hot desert climate (Köppen climate classification BWh).

Climate data for Jubail
Month	Jan	Feb	Mar	Apr	May	Jun	Jul	Aug	Sep	Oct	Nov	Dec	Year
Mean daily maximum °C (°F)	26.0 (78.8)	32.0 (89.6)	36.0 (96.8)	41.0 (105.8)	46.0 (114.8)	48.0 (118.4)	49.0 (120.2)	50.0 (122.0)	47.0 (116.6)	44.0 (111.2)	34.0 (93.2)	29.0 (84.2)	40.2 (104.3)
Daily mean °C (°F)	15.7 (60.3)	18.5 (65.3)	23.0 (73.4)	26.2 (79.2)	32.5 (90.5)	35.9 (96.6)	37.6 (99.7)	37.4 (99.3)	34.5 (94.1)	30.4 (86.7)	23.9 (75.0)	19.7 (67.5)	27.9 (82.3)
Mean daily minimum °C (°F)	8.0 (46.4)	9.0 (48.2)	13.0 (55.4)	13.0 (55.4)	20.0 (68.0)	24.0 (75.2)	27.0 (80.6)	28.0 (82.4)	22.0 (71.6)	20.0 (68.0)	14.0 (57.2)	12.0 (53.6)	17.5 (63.5)
Source: Wunderground King Fahad Airport (2023)

== See also ==
- List of cities and towns in Saudi Arabia
