= Operation Vigilant Warrior =

Military operation

- Part of Iraqi no-fly zones
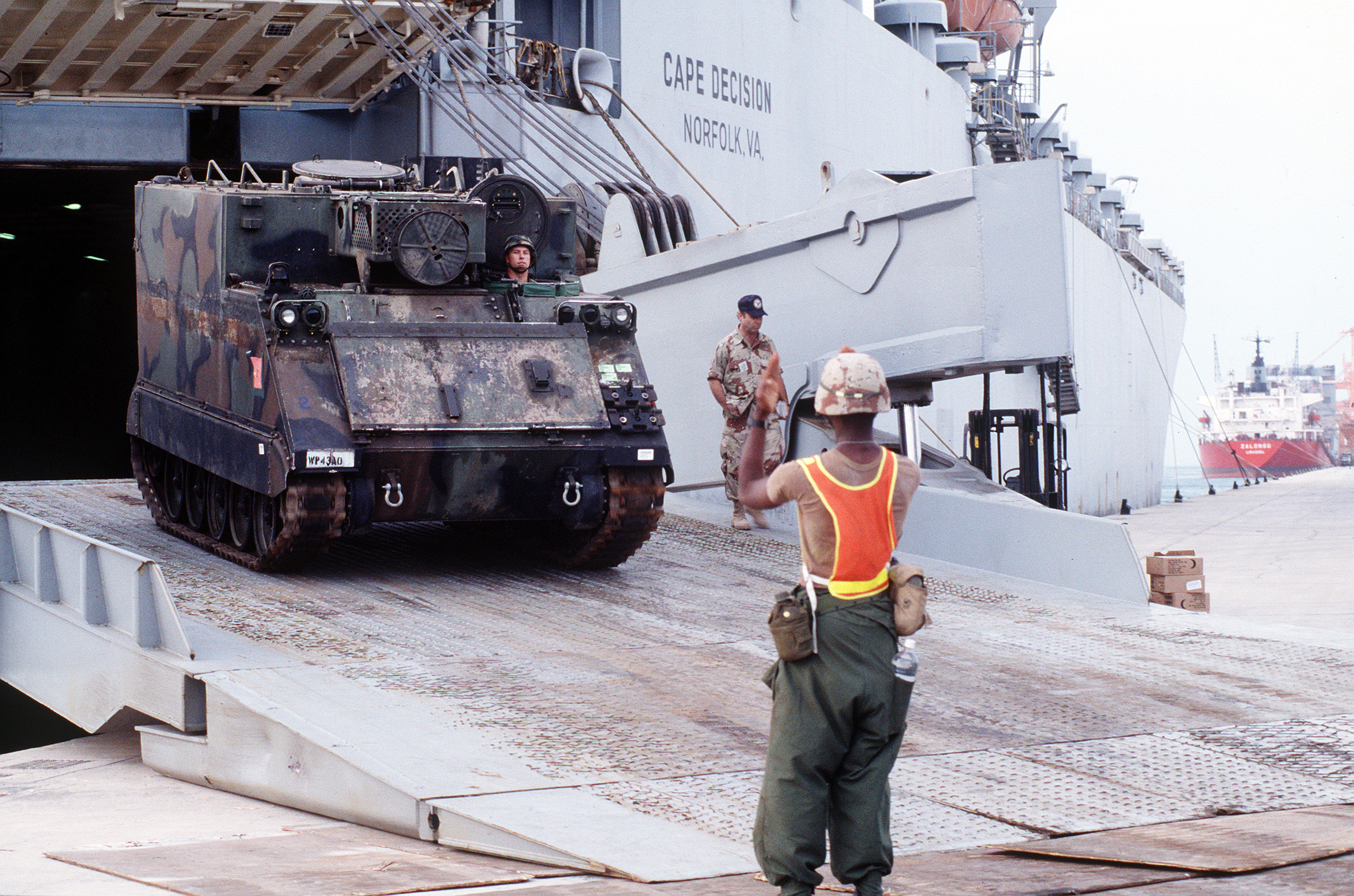
- An M577 command and control vehicle rolls off the Military Sealift Command ship MV Cape Decision
Date	8 October 1994 to 15 December 1994
Location	Iraq-Kuwait border
Result	U.S. military operation successful in keeping Iraq out of Kuwait

Operation Vigilant Warrior (Arabic: عملية المحارب اليقظ) was a military operation from 8 October 1994 to 15 December 1994 by the United States in response to two divisions of Iraqi Republican Guard troops moving toward the Kuwaiti border. A quick response by U.S. president Bill Clinton allowed USCENTAF command and staff to deploy to Riyadh within days.

== History ==
On 3 October 1994, Company C, Second Battalion, 5th Special Forces Group (Airborne); (C/2/5 SFG(A)); was deployed on IRIS GOLD 95-1 for presences forward and pre-mission training with selected elements of the Kuwait Ministry of Defence. The training mission rapidly transitioned to defense of Kuwait operation establishing a Combat Air Support (CAS) umbrella over the entire northern third of the State of Kuwait employing five each Special Forces, A-Teams, task organized and deploying 15 forward air control (FAC) Teams.

Over a 16-day period C/2/5 SFG (A) provided; composition and disposition of all forces arrayed in the Kuwait Defense Plan (KDP); de-confliction of the main battle area; anti-fratricide capability; and real time ground truth in the battle space.

C/2/5 SFG (A) maintained the CAS umbrella continuously until elements of 1st Brigade of the 24th Infantry Division (Mechanized) arrived in Kuwait and established an operational capability on or about 19 October 1994.

Operational Outcome: Army Pre-positioned Stocks (APS) concept could not adequately respond to tactical threats emerging in the Persian Gulf area.

Strategic Outcome: The Strategic Operational gap analysis indicated in order to protect U.S. National Interest on the Arabian Peninsula; requires establishment of a U.S. Army brigade combat team (BCT) in the State of Kuwait.

On the evening of 7 October 1994, 1st Brigade of the 24th Infantry Division (Mechanized) based at Fort Stewart, Georgia, went on alert. The following day, lead elements of that Brigade, consisting of several line companies each from the 2/7 Infantry Battalion and 3/69 Armor Battalion and 1/41 Field Artillery Battalion plus the 2/7 Infantry Battalion Headquarters deployed by air on orders to Camp Doha, Kuwait. Those elements completed the air movement within 48 hours. Within 72 hours, that reinforced brigade drew pre-positioned equipment stored at Camp Doha. In addition two Patriot missile batteries from Fort Polk, Louisiana, were dispatched to theater.

On 8 October, 1st Force Service Support Group (FSSG), I Marine Expeditionary Force, was put on alert. The 1st FSSG Forward (FWD) was manned up to deploy as the lead element for the 1st FSSG. The FSSG FWD deployed 120 Marines and equipment from March Air Force Base, California, to Dhahran, Saudi Arabia, via U.S. Air Force (USAF) cargo aircraft on 28 October 1994. The unit then traveled north by convoy to the port of Jubail. At the same time, the 3rd Brigade, 24th Infantry Division (Mechanized) deployed from Fort Benning, Georgia, to the port of Ad-Dammam, which would draw pre-positioned afloat equipment.

Also on 8 October, the USAF 23rd Wing's 75th Fighter Squadron Tigersharks and its full complement of A-10 Thunderbolt II attack aircraft initially deployed from Pope AFB, North Carolina to Dhahran AB, Saudi Arabia, followed by the first forward deployment to Ahmed al Jabber AB, Kuwait. This allowed better face-to-face coordination with Tactical Air Control Party (TACP) assets further forward deployed at Camp Doha, Kuwait, and points North. They initiated the first of a series of 120-day rotations for the A-10 community that continued until operation Iraqi Freedom commenced.

The United Kingdom's contribution was two Royal Navy warships, HMS Cardiff and HMS Cornwall, doubling their deployment of Royal Air Force Tornado GR1 combat aircraft (originally six) and increasing their troop numbers to 1,000. Elements of 45 Commando Royal Marines were airlifted into Kuwait. The Commandos operated alongside the 1st Brigade of 24th Infantry Division.

Iraq recalled its ground forces during the last weeks of October. With no remaining need for the combat troops, retrograde began within a few days. The Marines departed from Dhahran, Saudi Arabia, on 5 November 1994. Much of the 24th Infantry Division turned in the pre-positioned equipment and rotated out of Kuwait before Thanksgiving Day, but trail elements remained until the first days of December.

== Debate over Iraqi intentions ==
There is significant debate over Iraqi intentions during the October 1994 crisis. Iraqi president Saddam Hussein's son-in-law Hussein Kamel stated after his defection to Jordan in 1995 that Saddam had intended to invade Kuwait a second time but was forestalled by a rapid U.S. response to reinforce the kingdom. Others have argued that Saddam never intended to actually invade Kuwait and the movements were intended as a provocation to draw attention to Iraq's plight under the international sanctions regime.

Former Republican Guard general Ra'ad al-Hamdani claimed in an interview after the 2003 invasion that Saddam had decided in September 1994 to invade Kuwait but that he had opposed Saddam during a meeting on 11 September 1994.

Iraq formally recognized Kuwait's independence at the end of the crisis on 10 November 1994.

== Awards and recognition ==
The Joint Meritorious Unit Award given went to HQ United States Military Training Mission Riyadh, Saudi Arabia, 8 October 1994 through 15 December 1994, for Operation Vigilant Warrior. U.S. servicemembers who participated were authorized the Southwest Asia Service Medal but not the Kuwait Liberation Medal (Saudi Arabia) or the Kuwait Liberation Medal (Kuwait) due to these events taking place after the end dates of those specific medals.

President Clinton visited the deployed troops in late October. On 28 October, he spoke to the members of the 1st Brigade, 24th Infantry Division at their positions in the desert to the northwest of Kuwait City. Clinton emphasized the speed at which the brigade deployed deterred a repeat of the 1990 invasion of Kuwait. Clinton stated, "You got here in a very big hurry. And because of that, Iraq got the message in a very big hurry. It withdrew its forces that were massed near the Kuwaiti border." And to the joy of the deployed troops, he also announced they would be home before Christmas and that they would receive additional combat zone deployment allowances (amounting to $300 per month for enlisted soldiers).

== See also ==
- Gulf War
- Iraq War
