= Yanbu Commercial Port =

Port on Red Sea

- Interactive map of Yanbu Commercial Port
- Location in Saudi Arabia

Location
- Country: Saudi Arabia
- Location: Yanbu, Red Sea
- Coordinates: 24°04′N 38°03′E
- UN/LOCODE: SAYNB

Details
- Size: 3.892.265.66 m2
- No. of berths: 12

Statistics
- Website mawani.gov.sa/en-us/saports/yanbut/pages/default.aspx

Yanbu Commercial Port is among the ancient ports on the Red Sea. Its strategic importance comes from the fact that the port is a main gateway to the Muslim holy city of Medinah, as well as being a minor alternative to oil exports through the Strait of Hormuz.. It is a natural port surrounded by land and coral reef.

The port, like many other Saudi ports, has undergone many development projects since the establishment of Saudi Arabia. The port sector, including Yanbu Commercial Port, is administered by the Saudi Ports Authority.

Yanbu Commercial Port's operations grow faster as in 2018 only the port operated 3.33 million tons of cargo. The port includes a 7,200-square-metre (78,000 sq ft) terminal to receive pilgrims.

== Oil terminal ==
As of 2025, the port has three deepwater piers available for oil and gas condensate shipping. The Saudi Aramco Yanbu Refinery is located adjacent to the port as well as the western terminus of the East–West Crude Oil Pipeline transporting oil from oil fields in eastern Saudi Arabia.

== See also ==
- King Fahad Industrial Port (Yanbu)
- Saudi Ports Authority
- Yanbu
