= King Fahd Industrial Port (Yanbu) =

King Fahad Industrial Port (Yanbu)
- Interactive map of King Fahad Industrial Port (Yanbu)
- Location within Saudi Arabia

Location
- Country: Saudi Arabia
- Location: Yanbu, Red Sea
- Coordinates: 23°56′N 38°15′E
- UN/LOCODE: SAYBI

Details
- Owned by: Saudi Ports Authority
- Size: 50 km2
- No. of berths: 34

Statistics
- Website www.ports.gov.sa

King Fahad Industrial Port (Yanbu) is a Saudi port located in Yanbu city of Saudi Arabia on the Red sea coast. It is the largest port for loading crude oil and petrochemicals in the Red Sea.

== Specification ==
King Fahad Industrial Port has a total length of 25 km and an area of 50 km^{2}. The port has 34 berths with a capacity of 210 million tons per year. There are three terminals in the port: the General Cargo and Containers Terminal, the Bulk Cargo Terminal, and the Crude Oil Terminal.

The city of Yanbu receives up to 7 million barrels of oil per day (BPD) of Arab Light oil from the Abqaiq oil field in Saudi Arabia's Eastern Province on the Persian Gulf coast through the 1,200 km (750 mi) East–West Crude Oil Pipeline, providing an alternative to the Strait of Hormuz. The port usually handles 1–1.5 million BPD, but has an export capability of 3 million BPD.

During the 2026 Iran war, a missile had targeted the port, but was intercepted. A drone crashed in the SAMREF refinery, causing minor damage. Yanbu increased oil export to 3.8 mBPD (4.3 for all of Saudi Arabia)—less than the 7 mBPD that ARAMCO exported through the Strait of Hormuz before Iran closed it.

== See also ==
- Saudi Ports Authority
- Yanbu Commercial Port
