= 2026 East–West Crude Oil Pipeline attack =

2026 drone attack on Saudi Arabia's East–West oil pipeline amid the Iran war

- Part of the 2026 Iran war
- Smoke rising from the pipeline on 10 September 2026
- Date: 10–11 September 2026
- Location: East–West Crude Oil Pipeline, Riyadh and Medina regions, Saudi Arabia
- Caused by: Attack amid the wider Iran war and disruption of shipping through the Strait of Hormuz
- Methods: Multiple drone strikes on pipeline pumping stations
- Status: Pipeline shut down as a precaution
- Result: Pipeline shut; Saudi oil trade disrupted; oil price raised; no retaliation

Parties
Saudi Arabia	Iran-aligned militias in Iraq (alleged, denied) Houthis (alleged)

Casualties and losses
- Several people injured; no deaths reported

On 10–11 September 2026, a series of drone strikes launched from Iraqi territory hit Saudi Arabia's East–West Crude Oil Pipeline amid the wider 2026 Iran war. Saudi Arabia shut down the pipeline as a precautionary measure following the attack, temporarily removing its main alternative route for exporting crude oil while the Strait of Hormuz remained effectively closed by Iran.

== Background ==
With Iran effectively shuttering the Strait of Hormuz amid the ongoing war between the United States and Iran, Saudi Arabia had rerouted about 5 million barrels of oil per day that would otherwise have moved through the Gulf, sending it instead via the 1,200 km (750 mi) East–West pipeline to the Red Sea port of Yanbu. Saudi Aramco CEO Amin H. Nasser had said the previous month that the pipeline had played a bigger role in mitigating the oil supply disruption caused by the Iran war than the release of emergency crude reserves. Earlier in the war, in April 2026, attacks on Saudi energy facilities, including a strike on one East–West pipeline pumping station, had already cut the kingdom's oil production capacity by around 600,000 barrels per day. Iran-allied militants had stepped up attacks on Saudi Arabia in the days before the September strikes, including Houthi attacks from Yemen that hit energy facilities and other civilian sites, injuring more than 70 people.

== Attack ==
Drones targeted the pipeline in the Riyadh and Medina regions on the morning of 10 September 2026, causing fires and damage to pump stations and injuring several people, the Saudi government said. Two US officials told CNN that pump stations located next to the pipeline had been struck, and satellite imagery from the Copernicus Sentinel-3 satellite showed a black smoke plume over the pipeline route between Medina and Mahd Al-Dhahab, with NASA's FIRMS system also detecting clustered thermal anomalies in the area. The Saudi Ministry of Energy confirmed on 11 September that the pipeline had been shut down "as a precautionary measure".

The Saudi Ministry of Foreign Affairs condemned "the attack on the East-West Pipeline in the Riyadh and Madinah regions by several drones coming from Iraq, which resulted in injuries and some damage that is currently being addressed". Though the origin of the attackers was not officially confirmed, Behnam Ben Taleblu, senior director of the Iran programme at the Foundation for Defense of Democracies, said Iran-aligned militia groups in Iraq had used drones in past attacks on Saudi Arabia, and may have done so again as part of a broader Iranian strategy of using proxies to pressure Arab states to reject a US military presence in the region. The Iraqi Prime Minister's Office said early on 13 September that a military commander who led operations in Maysan Governorate had been dismissed after investigations confirmed the drone attacks had been launched from a location within that southern Iraqi province.

The Iraqi militias have denied having any involvement in the attack, stating that the allegations were "a source of pride if we had carried out such an action", but "not something we claim".

== Aftermath ==
Saudi Arabia said it had opted against retaliation following a request from the Iraqi prime minister, while adding that the kingdom reserved the right to "take all measures necessary" to protect its interests. Iraq's government condemned the attack, and a statement from Sabah al-Numan, spokesperson for the commander-in-chief of the Iraqi armed forces, affirmed Iraq's "rejection of any aggression that threatens the Kingdom's security and stability". Iraq welcomed Saudi Arabia's decision to hold off on retaliation and said it appreciated Riyadh's response to its efforts to contain the situation.

With the pipeline, which had been moving an estimated 4 million to 5 million barrels per day, shut down and no ready alternative to redirect the same volume of eastern crude to Yanbu, oil prices broke above $100 a barrel for the first time in months, closing the week more than 8 percent higher. The International Energy Agency said Saudi crude supply had fallen to its lowest level in more than three decades, a decline it attributed partly to separate Houthi-linked attacks on shipping transiting the Strait of Bab al-Mandab.

On 22 September 2026, the pipeline restarted operations at very low volume, adding that it would likely take at least six to eight weeks to regain the full capacity.

== See also ==
- East–West Crude Oil Pipeline
- 2019 Afif attack
- 2026 Strait of Hormuz crisis
- Houthi blockade of Saudi Arabia
