= Ottoman maritime law =

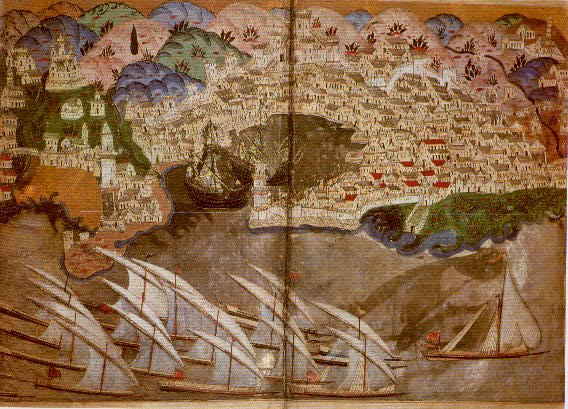
Ottoman ships in front of the city of Toulon, 16th Century

Ottoman maritime law, in its most recent form, is based on the Commercial Code of 1850 and Maritime Code of 1863, codified during the Tanzimat reforms.

== Scope of jurisdiction ==
Since the 15th century, the Ottoman Empire had held interest in protecting their commercial and military assets, in accordance with the doctrine set forth by Mehmed II. Beginning with the Aegean Sea, Ottoman admiralty law expanded to have jurisdiction over seas such as the Black Sea, Red Sea, Indian Ocean, and many other bodies of water around the Mediterranean. During the Tanzimat period, much of Ottoman maritime law was based directly off French Code de Commerce, as well as earlier French ordinances, which outlined rules regarding bookkeeping, jurisdiction, and procedure for merchants within the empire. While the Ottoman Capitulations promoted free trade, the Black Sea was more heavily regulated, drawing in wealth through the many customs and duties throughout the region. Throughout the late 18th century, the Ottoman Empire took multiple actions to clarify and defend their territories from European interests, creating a line around surrounding peninsulas and islands.

== Structure ==
Admiralty law in Turkey underwent several changes in structure throughout the empire's lifespan. Until the second accession of Mehmed II, Ottoman interests did not focus on becoming a seafaring empire. Once the navy was established, presence in the Barbary coast and surrounding waters were established, though with no legal document to define borders or boundaries. Before the 19th Century, towns, villages, and coastal settlements often created their own laws of the sea, with the intention of protecting their ports and land. This reactionary approach to maritime law would set the precedent for Turkish jurisprudence of the sea, and up until the reform of law under French systems, Ottoman maritime law was largely free of centralized structure. Merchants were permitted to pass through waters for trade, however beyond the port of Jeddah, non-Turkish ships were barred passage.

=== Piracy and privateers ===
Once Mehmed II made efforts for commercial trade with neighboring states, the threat of piracy became a larger concern. The 15th century expansion of trade in the Mediterranean led to an increase in pirate activity, namely by the Barbary corsairs. With this consistent threat, multiple treaties were signed between Italy and Turkey to curtail the efforts of the pirates. Given that the corsairs targeted Christian ships and crew, Christian powers in Europe (such as France) blamed the rampancy of attacks on Ottoman authority, going so far to claim that there was a conspiracy against Catholics.

Throughout the 17th and 18th centuries, the Mediterranean was filled with conflict between warring European States, which in turn damaged Ottoman commerce. Namely, privateers from the British empire disrupted trade, sparking a series of policies aimed at protecting surrounding waters by the ḳapūdān-ı deryā. These capitulations were noted by the British as some of the earlier published legal documents aimed at global trade, and to their dismay, restricted freedoms rather than giving them. These laws resulted in increase seizure of British and French vessels in the Mediterranean, sparking legal disputes between the countries as well as restitution towards the Ottomans.

== History ==
=== Expansion and peak (1453-1566) ===
During the late 15th and 16th Centuries, the Ottoman Empire had been forced to focus on the ever-growing presence of piracy within their domain. As early as 1482, anti-piracy clauses within Ottoman treaties began to appear, especially with documents related to Venetian trade in the Mediterranean.

=== Stagnation and reform (1566-1827) ===
Until the Tanzimat reforms, there were no special courts for maritime law, and any dispute would be brought towards a Qadi, who would oftentimes seek out the professional opinion of those involved in maritime trade. During this era, Ottoman maritime law was customary, so only those directly related to commerce and shipping would have knowledge of standard procedures. While Qadis oversaw many cases related to wreckage, payments, collisions, and other incidents, provincial courts or even the Kazasker would sometimes handle maritime cases, typically dealing with piracy.

=== Decline and modernization (1828-1908) ===
In the wake of the multiple conflicts faced by the Ottoman Empire, control over distant waters dissipated, with a multitude of treaties signed relinquishing Turkish control. This period saw great loss of Turkish influence over shipping water, and reduction of benefits over foreign use of their ports and waterways.

==== Treaty of Edirne (Adrianople) ====
Following the Russo-Turkish War of 1828-29, Turkey signed the Treaty of Edirne, giving up the Danube, and areas in the Black Sea, turning them over to Russia.

==== Treaty of Commerce and Navigation with the United States ====
As early as 1799, the United States had sent ambassadors to Turkey to discuss trade agreements. In 1830, the U.S. and Turkey signed the Treaty of Commerce and Navigation, which outlined extraterritorial rights over sailors, purchasing of American-built ships, use of navies, and permitting passage of vessels through each other's canals. This treaty favored American interests, which were only expanded upon in the 1862 when a second treaty was signed.

== Bibliography ==
- Faroqhi, Suraiya N., and Kate Fleet, eds. The Cambridge History of Turkey. of Cambridge History of Turkey. Cambridge: Cambridge University Press, 2012.
- Fleet, Kate. "Ottoman Commercial History." Oxford Research Encyclopedia of Asian History. 28 Jun. 2021; Accessed 12 Feb. 2025. https://oxfordre.com/asianhistory/view/10.1093/acrefore/9780190277727.001.0001/acrefore-9780190277727-e-482.
- Gordon, Leland J. “Turkish-American Treaty Relations.” The American Political Science Review 22, no. 3 (1928): 711–21. https://doi.org/10.2307/1945626.
- Panzac, Daniel. “International and Domestic Maritime Trade in the Ottoman Empire during the 18th Century.” International Journal of Middle East Studies 24, no. 2 (1992): 189–206. http://www.jstor.org/stable/164294.
- Talbot, Michael et al. “Ottoman Seas and British Privateers: Defining Maritime Territoriality in the Eighteenth-Century Levant.” Well-Connected Domains. vol. 57. N.p., 2014. 54–70. Web.
- Talbot, Michael and Işıksel Güneş British-Ottoman Diplomacy and the Making of Maritime Law. Ottoman History Podcast August 21, 2015 https://www.ottomanhistorypodcast.com/2015/08/british-ottoman-diplomacy-and-making-of.html
- The Editors of Encyclopædia Britannica. "Treaty of Edirne." Encyclopædia Britannica, September 7, 2024. https://www.britannica.com/event/Treaty-of-Edirne.
- “Treaty of Commerce and Navigation Between the United States of America and the Turkish Republic.” The American Journal of International Law 25, no. 2 (1931): 116–19. https://doi.org/10.2307/2212916.
- White, Joshua M. “LITIGATING DISPUTES OVER SHIPS AND CARGO IN EARLY MODERN OTTOMAN COURTS.” Quaderni Storici 51, no. 153 (3) (2016): 701–25. http://www.jstor.org/stable/44807442.
- White, Joshua M. Piracy and Law in the Ottoman Mediterranean. 1st ed. Stanford University Press, 2018. https://doi.org/10.2307/j.ctvqr1fh9.
