= Yuc =

Yuc or YUC can refer to:

- Yucatán, a state of Mexico
- Yuchi language, a Native American language spoken in Oklahoma, U.S., by ISO 639 code
- Yanbu University College, a university located in Yanbu Al-Sinaiyah, Saudi Arabia

== See also ==
- Yuck (disambiguation)
