= East–West Crude Oil Pipeline =

Oil pipeline in Saudi Arabia

- The East-West Crude Oil Pipeline (left) and the UAE's Habshan–Fujairah oil pipeline (right)

Location
- Country: Saudi Arabia
- Province: Eastern Province; Riyadh Province; Medina Province
- Start: Abqaiq
- To: Yanbu

General information
- Type: Crude oil
- Status: Operational
- Owner: Saudi Aramco
- Commissioned: 1981

Technical information
- Length: 1,200 km (750 mi)
- Maximum discharge: 7 million barrels per day (1,100,000 m^{3}/d)
- Diameter: 1,220–1,420 mm (48–56 in)
- No. of pumping stations: 13

The East–West Pipeline, also known as the Petroline, is a 1,201-kilometre-long (746 mi) pipeline in Saudi Arabia that runs from the Abqaiq oil field in the Eastern Province (near Bahrain and Qatar on the Persian Gulf coast) across the width of the Arabian Peninsula, to Yanbu at the Red Sea. It was built during the Iran–Iraq War in the 1980s to allow Saudi oil exports to bypass the tanker war taking place in the Strait of Hormuz.

== Pipeline description ==
Saudi Aramco's East-West Pipeline consists of two pipes: one with a diameter of 142 centimetres (56 in) and another, originally built to transport natural gas liquids, with a diameter of 122 centimetres (48 in). The pipelines had a combined capacity of 5 million barrels per day [Mbbl/d] (790,000 m^{3}/d) in 2018. In 2026, the second pipeline was converted from natural gas liquids to crude oil, increasing the system's stated capacity to 7 Mbbl/d (1,100,000 m^{3}/d). The pipeline connects oil production facilities in eastern Saudi Arabia with Yanbu on the Red Sea coast, providing an alternative route for exporting crude oil from the kingdom's western coast.

At Yanbu, the pipeline supplies crude oil to three refineries and to export facilities. Up to 1 Mbbl/d (160,000 m^{3}/d) can be supplied to the refineries, while exports through the King Fahd Industrial Port (Yanbu) have included about 1.1–1.4 Mbbl/d (170,000–220,000 m^{3}/d) of Arab Light crude, with a stated loading limit of 3 Mbbl/d (480,000 m^{3}/d).

Yanbu's two oil-loading terminals, Yanbu North and Yanbu South, have a nominal combined loading capacity of about 4.5 Mbbl/d (720,000 m^{3}/d) and a tested capacity of about 4 Mbbl/d (640,000 m^{3}/d). In 2026, the shipping and trading market intelligence firm Vortexa estimated that loading capacity could fall to about 3 Mbbl/d (480,000 m^{3}/d) under wartime conditions.

== History ==
External videos
- East West Petroline

The pipeline was built in the 1980s, "amid fears that the Iran-Iraq war would cut off shipping through the Strait of Hormuz." The pipeline has been converted at times to carry natural gas, and later converted back to carry crude oil.

In May 2019, the Houthi drone attack on Afif temporarily shut the pipeline.

During the 2026 Iran war and the closure of the Strait of Hormuz to non-Iranian vessels, it was converted to full capacity on 11 March 2026. After conversion, the amount of oil transferred using the Bab-el-Mandeb strait rose by 21% in comparison to February 2026, all of it bound to Asia. On 9 April, throughput of the pipeline was reported to have been reduced by 700,000 barrels per day (110,000 m^{3}/d) by an Iranian drone attack on a pumping station. It was said to be restored to full capacity three days later. Saudi Aramco maintains "zero-hour response" teams that use drones, pre-positioned repair materials, and contingency plans to rapidly assess and repair infrastructure following attacks, according to its CEO.

=== Pipeline attacks ===
On 10 September 2026, a pumping station along the pipeline was hit by a drone attack, causing a fire. Because of this and other attacks, on 11 September 2026, Saudi Arabia shutdown the entire pipeline as a precaution. The attacks originated from the Maysan Governorate of Iraq, and the government responded by removing the Maysan operations commander from his post. The attacks caused damage to pumping stations associated with the pipeline, with satellite imagery showing fires at multiple locations along the pipeline route including three pumping stations. Saudi officials said emergency and specialized technical teams were deployed to secure the pipeline and assess its safety. The shutdown halted crude oil loadings at Yanbu and led Saudi Aramco to cancel some crude cargoes to European customers. On September 18, Reuters reported that at least two European refiners had been told they would receive no Saudi crude in October. Aramco subsequently increased crude exports from its eastern Gulf terminals and used ship-to-ship transfers near Oman to partially offset the disruption to Red Sea exports. On 22 September 2026, the pipeline restarted operations at a lower volume, adding that it would likely take at least six to eight weeks to regain the full capacity.

== See also ==
- Habshan–Fujairah oil pipeline, a 2012 pipeline in UAE that bypasses the Strait of Hormuz
- Houthi–Saudi Arabian conflict
- Trans-Arabian Pipeline (Tapline), a pipeline that ran from the Persian Gulf to Lebanon from 1950 to 1976
