= Yanbu =

Yanbu Governorate محافظة ينبع
- City
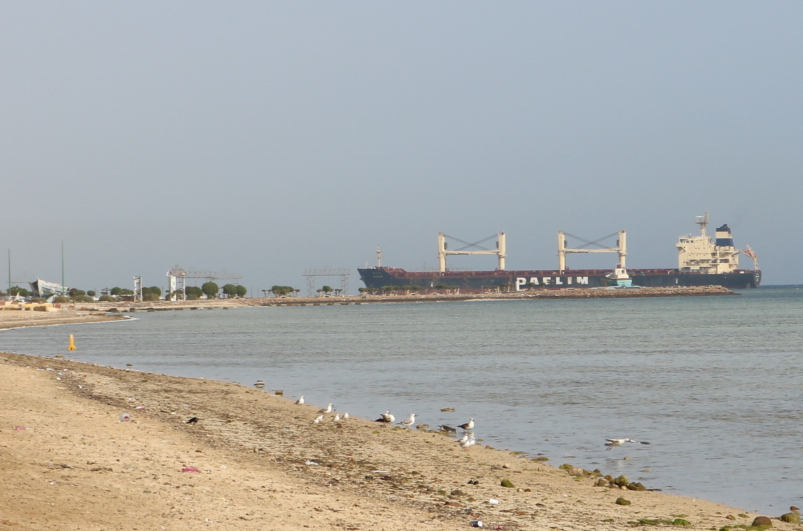
- Yanbu's beach

- Location of Yanbu Governorate within Medina Province

- Location within Saudi Arabia
- Coordinates: 24°5′22″N 38°3′43″E
- Country: Saudi Arabia
- Province: Medina Province
- Region: Hejaz
- Established: 491 BCE
- Seat: Yanbu City

Government
  - Type: Royal Commission / Municipality
  - Body: Royal Commission for Yanbu (Upper body); Yanbu Municipality (Lower body)

Area
  - City: 606 km^{2} (234 sq mi)
  - Metro: 10,340 km^{2} (3,990 sq mi)

Population (2022 census)
  - City: 331,916
  - Density: 548/km^{2} (1,420/sq mi)
  - Metro: 359,631 (Yanbu governorate)
- Time zone: UTC+03:00 (SAST)
- Area code: 014

Yanbu (Arabic: ينبع, romanized: Yanbuʿ, lit. 'Spring'), colloquially sometimes referred to as Yambu (Arabic: يمبع, romanized: Yambuʿ), is a city and governorate in the Medina Province of western Saudi Arabia, located on the Red Sea coast. It is a major port and industrial center, known for its oil refineries and the Yanbu Industrial City. Yanbu is home to the province's only two ports, the Yanbu Commercial Port and the King Fahd Industrial Port, and is the second most populated city in the province after Medina.

== History ==
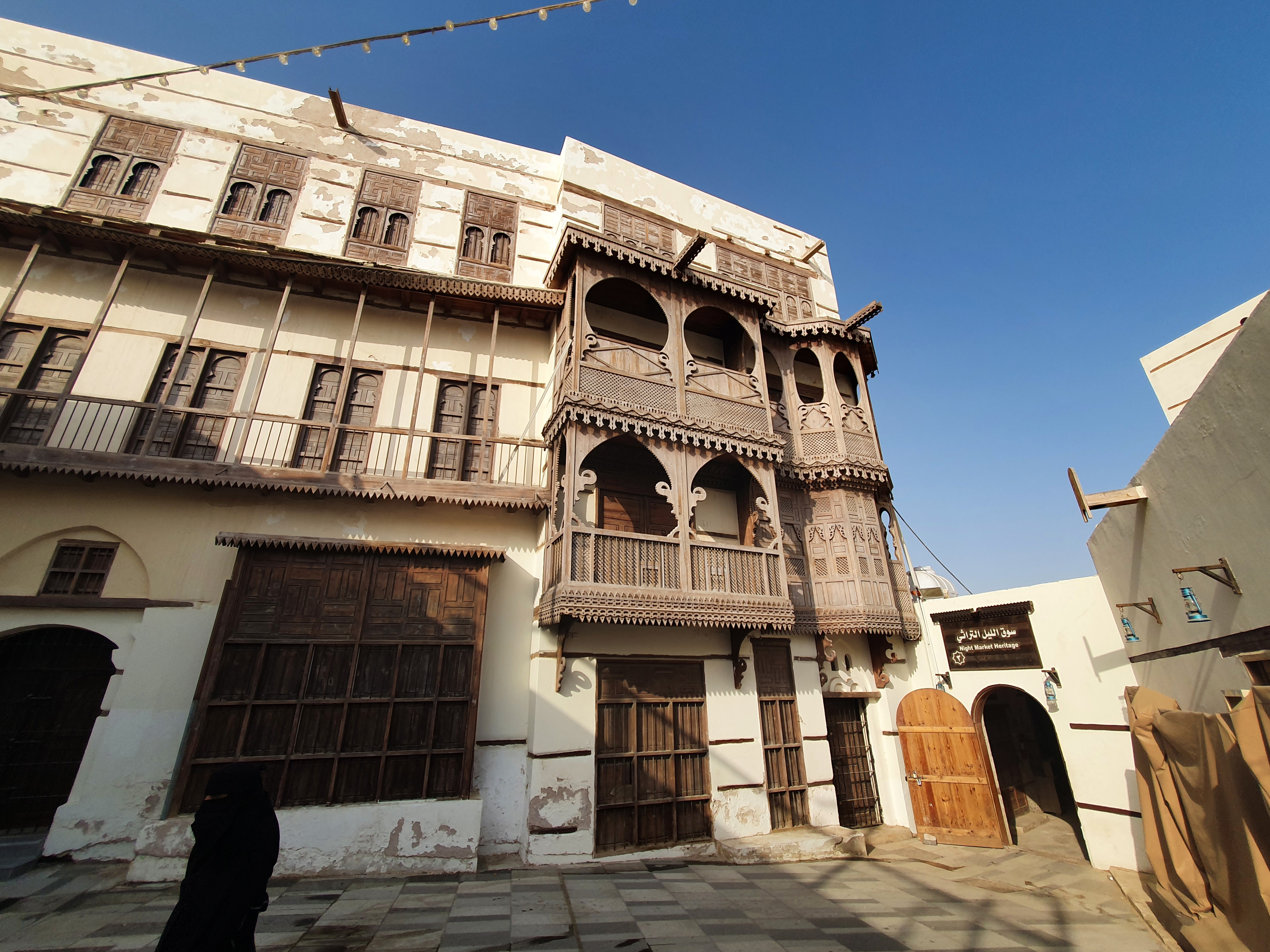
Old Yanbu

=== Pre-modern era ===
Yanbu's history dates back at least 2,500 years, when it was a staging point on the spice and incense route from Yemen to Egypt and the Mediterranean region.

Sharm Yanbu (Arabic: شرم ينبع), historically known as Charmuthas, which is a small peninsula located to the north of Yanbu was mentioned by the Greek historian Diodorus Siculus.

The Invasion of Dul Ashir took place in Yanbu two or three months after prophet Muhammad's return from Buwat. He appointed Abu Salamah Ibn Abd al-Assad to take his place in Medina while he was away commanding another raid. Between 150 and 200 followers joined this operation to al-Ushayra, Yanbu in either the month of Jumada al-awwal or Jumada al-Thani.

In this operation, Muhammad entered into an alliance with Banu Madlaj, a tribe inhabiting the vicinity of al-Ushayra. He also concluded another treaty that was made with Banu Damrah previously. All those treaties established good political connections for him.

=== Modern era ===
Yanbu served as a supply and operational base for Arab and British forces fighting the Ottoman Empire during World War I. On 27 July 1916 the Ottoman garrison surrendered in the Capture of Yanbu to the Arab revolutionary forces. It remained a small port town until 1975, when the Saudi government designated it as one of the country's two new industrial centers (the other being Al Jubayl in the Eastern Province). Extensive government and private development have taken place at the port and surrounding area, which is based on the petrochemical industry.

During the 2026 Iran war, an Iranian missile attacked a refinery near Yanbu, causing some parts of Yanbu to be destroyed.

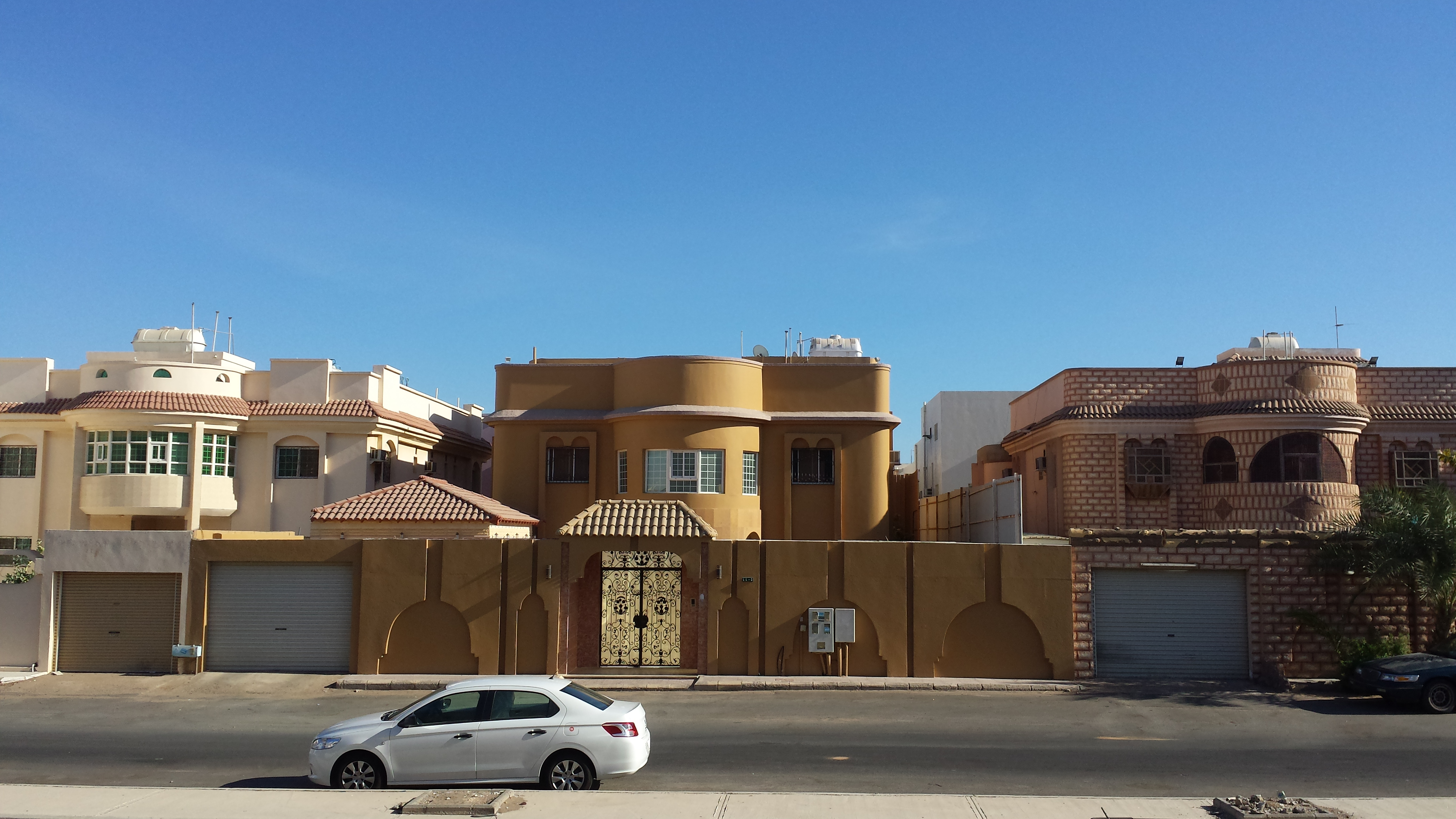
Residential areas in Yanbu

== Geography ==
The city is divided into three primary sections, which are located about fifteen minutes (drive by car) away from each other. Yanbu is the Second-largest Saudi Arabian city by the Red Sea, after Jeddah.

=== Yanbu Al-Bahr ===
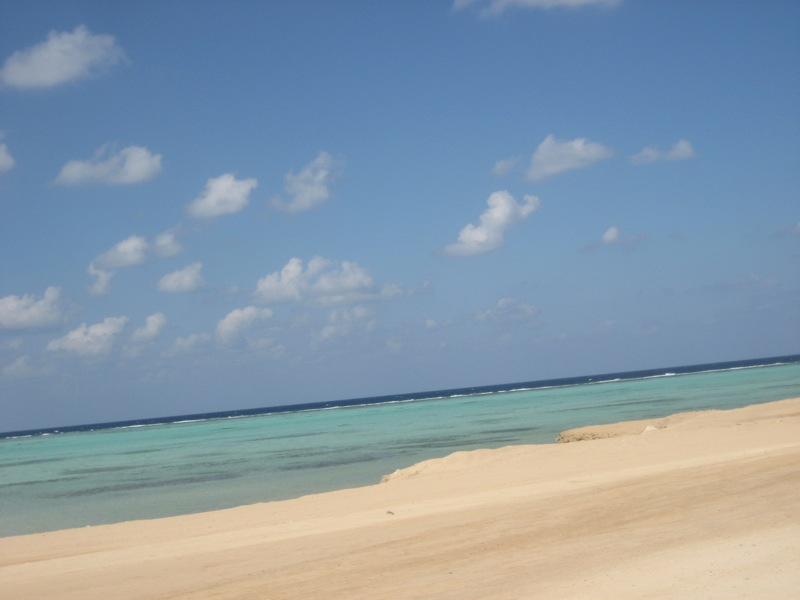
A Red Sea beach with turquoise waters at Yanbu

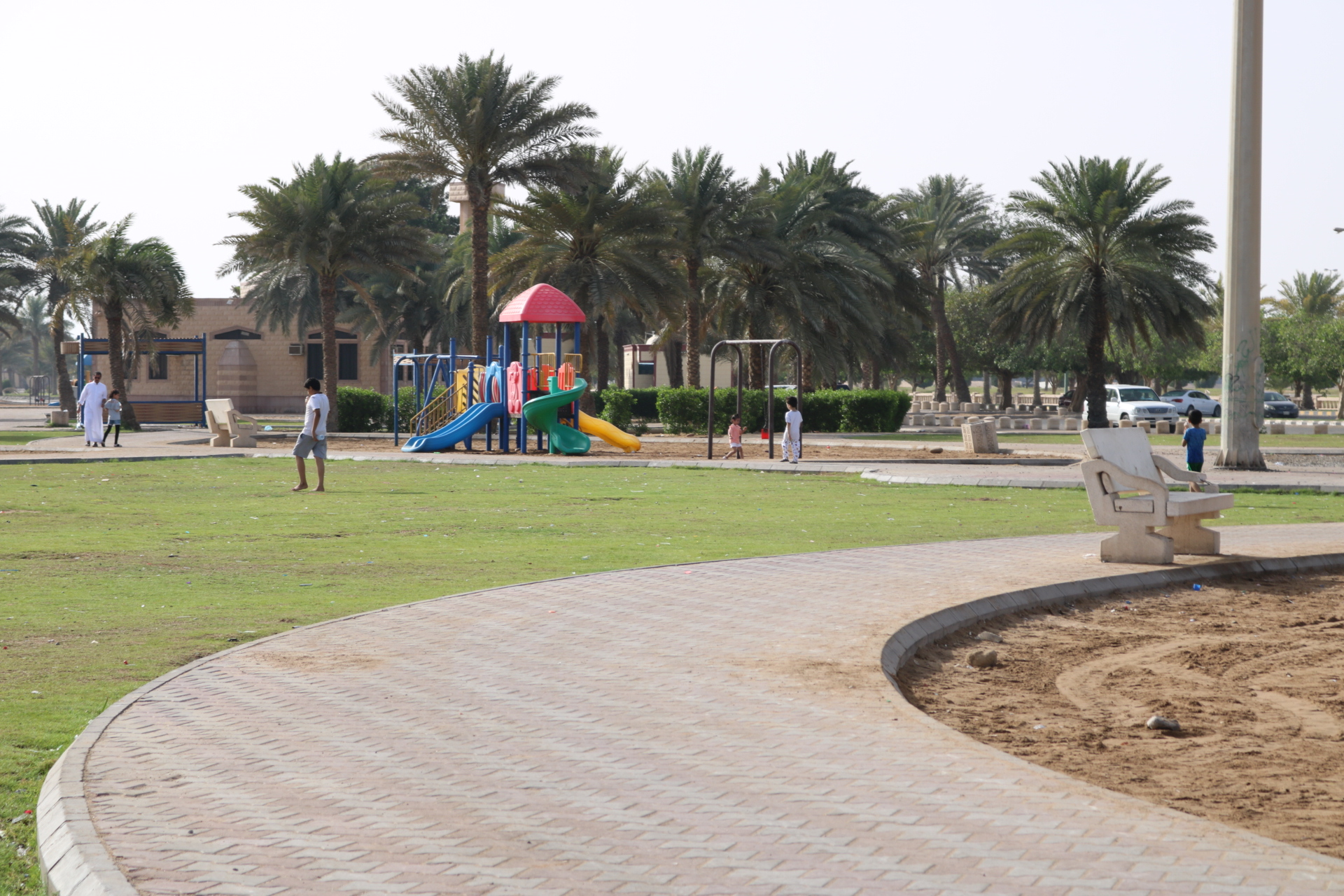
A park at Yanbu

Also known as Yanbu Al-Bahar ("spring by the sea") is the most northern part of Yanbu. The downtown area of Yanbu Al-Bahr (which is also called Al-Balad) contains most of the population. Most of the restaurants here cater to the various ethnic groups in the area, although some also cater to residents in the Royal Commission. The area also contains some international chain restaurants, as well as some coffee shops. There is also a shopping mall and various shopping centers located here as well. The city has many popular local brand hotels, including international brand like Holiday Inn Hotel, ibis Hotel, Radisson Blu Hotel and Novotel Hotel is located at the edge of this area, as is Prince Abdulmohsen Bin Abdulaziz International Airport. Arabian Homes also have a gated private residential community compound catering to the expat population, and is located next to the Holiday Inn. Most of the residents tend to be lower and middle-class Saudi citizens, and well as mostly South Asian and lower and middle-class Arab and other Middle Eastern expatriates. Every year there is a flower festival at the outskirts of Yanbu that has attracted many viewers around Saudi Arabia and neighboring countries.

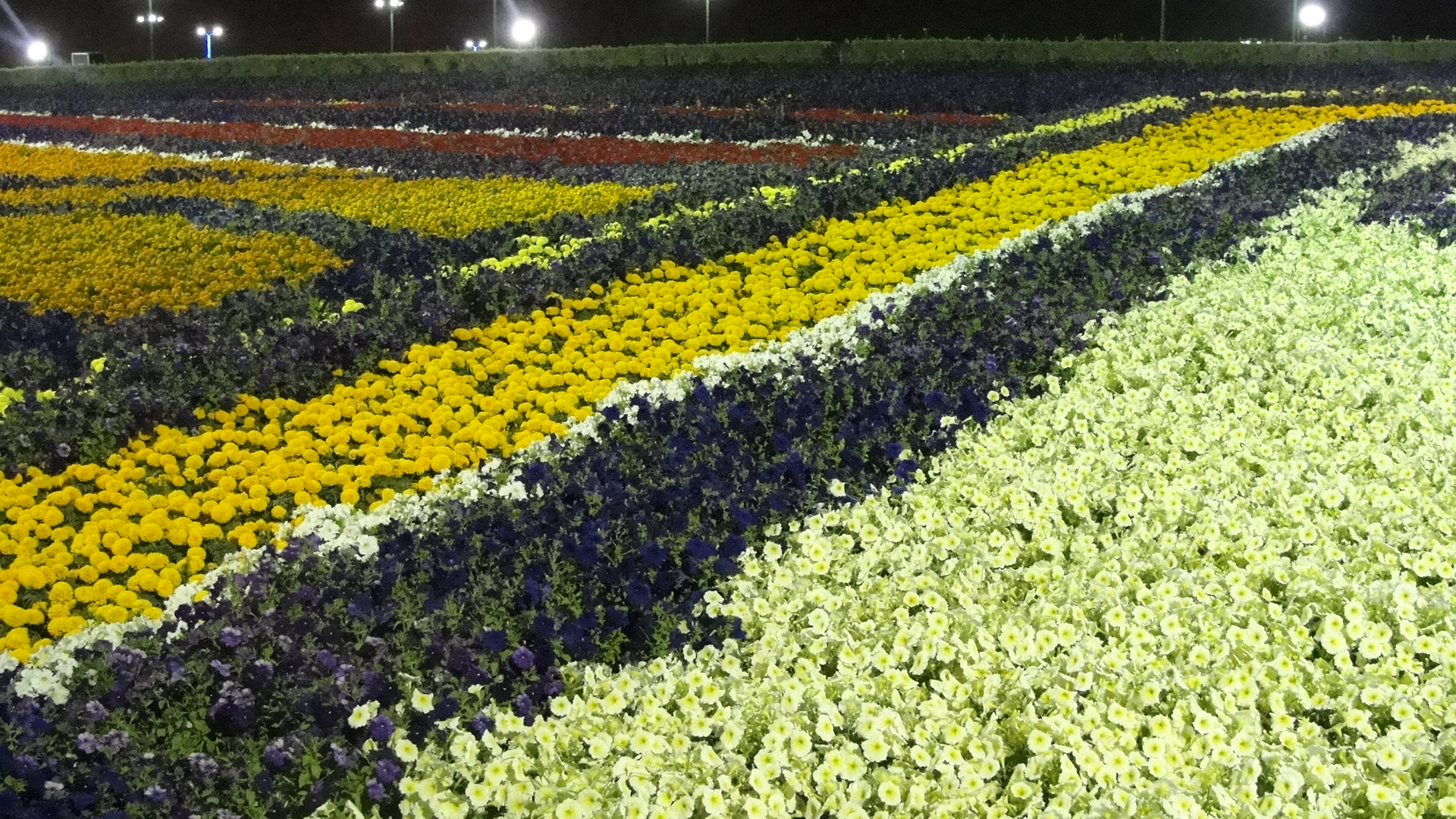
Yanbu flower festival

Currently, the government is attempting to improve the old, historical area in downtown Yanbu, as many historical buildings are located there. Many are still in a serious state of disrepair. While most of Yanbu Al-Balad has a rather old, worn-out feel to it, parts of the city, particularly at the edges of the city, are starting to modernize, as new shopping centers, as well as a new shopping mall, have been built. Jarir Bookstore had also opened a branch in Yanbu Al-Balad.

=== Yanbu Al-Nakhal ===
(The Palms) is a separate area, 47 kilometers from the city. The most notable village in Yanbu Al Nakhal is Jabriyya, where the local government office for the town is located. The village has a general hospital, a bank, three ATM machines, four filling stations, a fire station, two notable malls, several recreational facilities among other things. The Radwah Mountain is very visible anywhere in the town.

However, the town has neither hotels nor international schools, and locals and expatriates seeking foreign education for their children had to send them to international schools in the main city center, Yanbu Al Bahr, or in the Royal Commission.

=== Yanbu Al-Sina'iya ===
Yanbu Al-Sina'iya (literally "the industrial Yanbu") is the industrial city, established in 1975 by royal decree to create a Royal Commission to manage the effort to build a new modern city. It is the southernmost part of Yanbu city. Yanbu Al-Sina'iya is divided into two parts, the industrial area to the south, and a residential area (referred to as the Royal Commission by many locals) directly north and adjacent to the industrial area. The industrial area within Yanbu Al-Sina'iya is the area of all the major refineries and petrochemical installations and is still undergoing major growth. This area of Yanbu was a strip of undeveloped coastal desert land on the Red Sea and has been transformed into an industrial city.

Yanbu Al-Sina'iya's residential section is near the Royal Commission Headquarters. It has amenities such as many international chain and local restaurants, two shopping malls, various shopping centers, supermarkets of various sizes, hospitals, banks, and coffee shops. The Movenpick Hotel, Yanbu's newest hotel, is located here, as is The Cove, a gated private residential housing compound built around a large private lagoon. Yanbu Al Sinaiyah is home to Yanbu Industrial College, created for training and imparting knowledge for the students and workforce of the industry. Yanbu International School was also located here, prior to its closing in 2018.

The majority of Yanbu's Western expatriate population is found living in the Royal Commission. The rest of the residents of Yanbu Al-Sina'iya tend to be upper-middle and upper-class Saudi citizens, upper-class Asians, and upper-class Arab and Middle Eastern residents. The residential area of Yanbu Al-Sina'iya has a more modern, clean, and organized feel to it than the downtown area. It is also greener.

A new waterfront project has been launched in the coastline of Yanbu Industrial City. The total area of this project is 12 km. The project consists of four phases. The first phase is made of a campground equipped with the needed facilities. The second phase is made up of gardens, marina and a number of islands. The third phase has a recreation area, hotel and other facilities. The fourth phase has an aquarium.

=== Climate ===
Yanbu has a hot desert climate (Köppen climate classification BWh) with very hot summer-like weather year round.

Climate data for Yanbu'al Bahr (1991-2020)
Month	Jan	Feb	Mar	Apr	May	Jun	Jul	Aug	Sep	Oct	Nov	Dec	Year
Record high °C (°F)	35.0 (95.0)	37.3 (99.1)	40.0 (104.0)	44.4 (111.9)	49.0 (120.2)	49.6 (121.3)	51.0 (123.8)	49.5 (121.1)	49.0 (120.2)	47.4 (117.3)	44.7 (112.5)	42.0 (107.6)	51.0 (123.8)
Mean daily maximum °C (°F)	27.6 (81.7)	28.9 (84.0)	31.5 (88.7)	34.8 (94.6)	38.5 (101.3)	40.7 (105.3)	40.5 (104.9)	40.8 (105.4)	40.2 (104.4)	37.2 (99.0)	33.1 (91.6)	29.7 (85.5)	35.3 (95.5)
Daily mean °C (°F)	20.8 (69.4)	21.9 (71.4)	24.3 (75.7)	27.7 (81.9)	31.1 (88.0)	32.9 (91.2)	33.4 (92.1)	33.9 (93.0)	32.8 (91.0)	30.2 (86.4)	26.1 (79.0)	22.6 (72.7)	28.2 (82.8)
Mean daily minimum °C (°F)	14.3 (57.7)	15.3 (59.5)	17.4 (63.3)	20.8 (69.4)	24.1 (75.4)	25.7 (78.3)	27.0 (80.6)	27.9 (82.2)	26.5 (79.7)	23.9 (75.0)	19.7 (67.5)	16.2 (61.2)	21.6 (70.8)
Record low °C (°F)	4.7 (40.5)	6.5 (43.7)	8.7 (47.7)	11.5 (52.7)	15.6 (60.1)	18.0 (64.4)	21.3 (70.3)	20.4 (68.7)	19.0 (66.2)	14.3 (57.7)	12.0 (53.6)	7.8 (46.0)	4.7 (40.5)
Average precipitation mm (inches)	6.5 (0.26)	1.8 (0.07)	1.2 (0.05)	0.3 (0.01)	0.6 (0.02)	0.0 (0.0)	0.0 (0.0)	0.1 (0.00)	0.0 (0.0)	3.6 (0.14)	12.1 (0.48)	13.2 (0.52)	39.5 (1.56)
Average precipitation days (≥ 1 mm)	0.6	0.2	0.3	0.1	0.1	0.0	0.0	0.1	0.0	0.4	1.1	0.6	3.4
Average relative humidity (%)	51	54	52	55	56	57	58	59	60	60	57	54	56
Source 1: World Meteorological Organization
Source 2: Deutscher Wetterdienst (humidity 1970–1979)

== Economy ==
Yanbu is an important petroleum shipping terminal and is home to three oil refineries, a plastics facility, and several petrochemical plants. The city hosts two major seaports: the Yanbu Commercial Port and the King Fahd Industrial Port. These ports make Yanbu the country's second-largest port city after Jeddah and the principal maritime gateway for the holy city of Medina, located 160 km (99 mi) to the east.

Yanbu's natural harbour is protected on both sides by wide coral reefs, which remain largely untouched and are considered popular diving areas. Three major oil pipelines cross the desert from the oilfields in eastern Saudi Arabia and terminate at the Red Sea in Yanbu, supporting its role as a major hub for oil export and petrochemical industries.

== Education ==
=== Universities and Colleges ===
Yanbu is home to several institutions of higher education. Among them:

- The College of Computer Science & Engineering at Yanbu (CCSEY) is affiliated with Taibah University and offers undergraduate programs in computer science, engineering, and related fields.
- Yanbu Industrial College provides vocational and technical education, including programs in engineering, business, and applied sciences.
- Yanbu University College offers a range of bachelor's degree programs in arts, sciences, and professional disciplines.
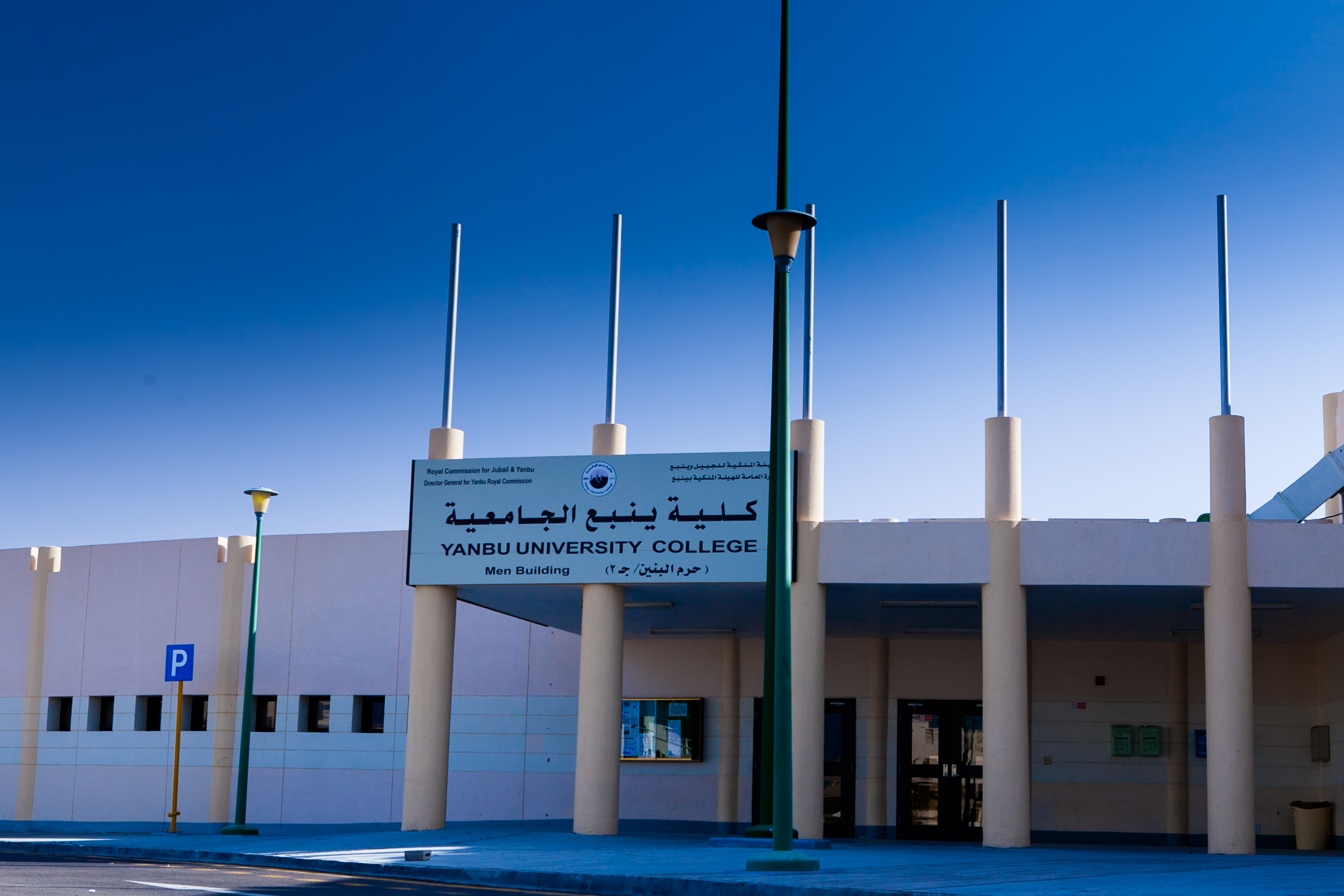
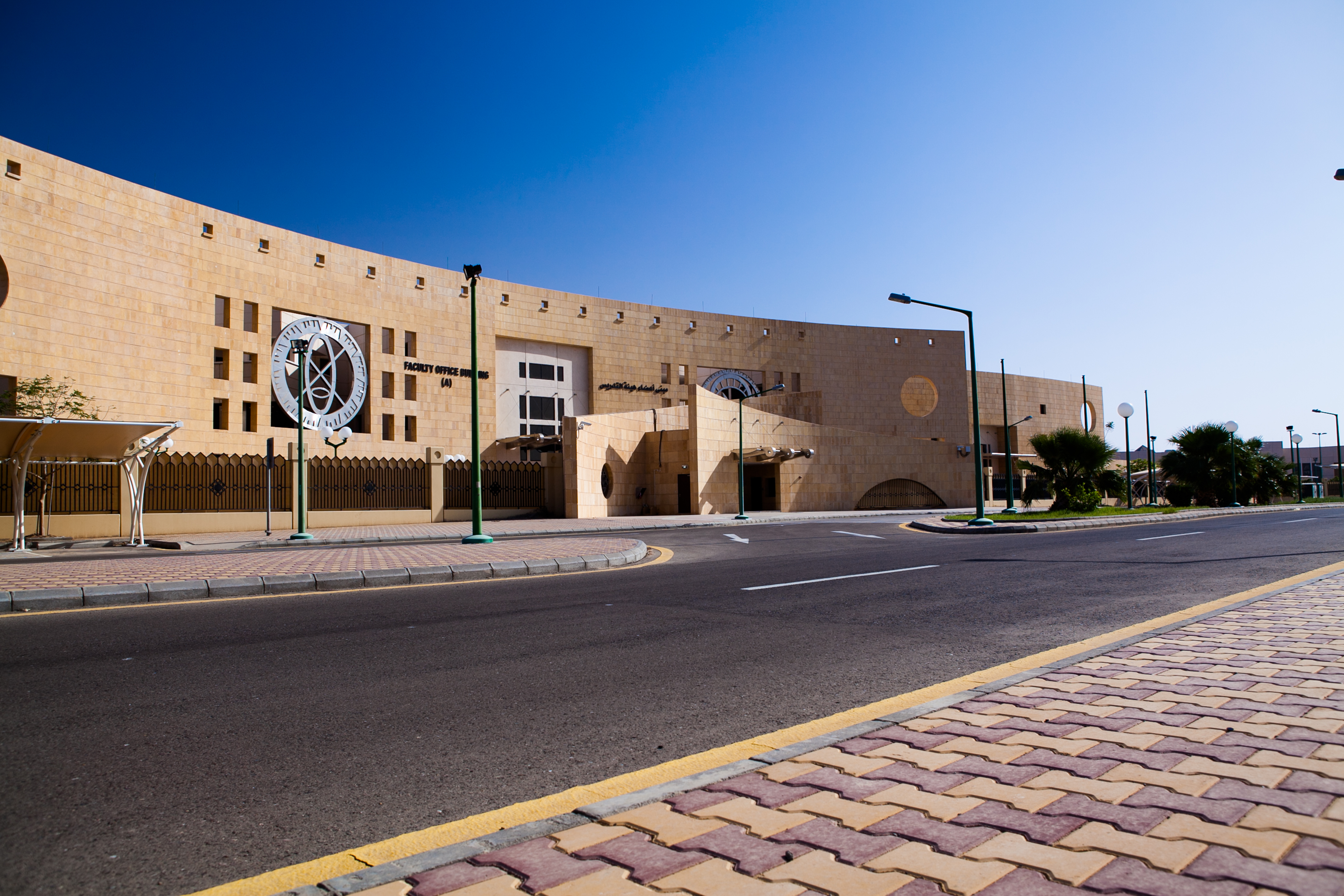
Yanbu University College campuses for men (up) and women (down)

=== Colleges of Technology ===
In addition to universities, Yanbu hosts technical and vocational institutions affiliated with the Technical and Vocational Training Corporation (TVTC), which provide diplomas and training programs for men and women in industrial and technological fields.

=== Public Schools ===
All public schools in Yanbu, from primary to secondary levels, are supervised by the Ministry of Education.

=== Private and International Schools ===
Yanbu also has several private and international schools. Notable institutions include:

- Al-Isra International School
- Al Manar International School -Yanbu
- Al-Tawhid International School
- Naba'a Al-Maarifa Private Schools
- Radhwa International School Yanbu
- Yanbu Elite International School
- Yanbu International School (closed as of 31 July 2018)

== Hospitals ==
- Al-Ansari Hospital
- Yanbu National Hospital
- Royal Commission Medical Center
- Al Amal Hospital

== Sports ==
Yanbu is home to two sports clubs: Al-Majd Club and Radwa Club.

== Tourism ==
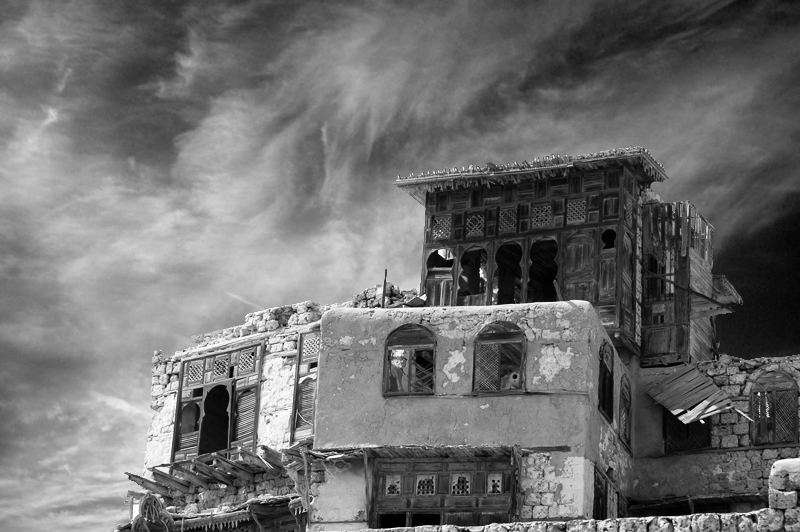
Traditional old houses in the city of Yanbu

Although Yanbu is primarily known for its industrial activities, it has been developing as a tourist destination in recent years. The city's coastline is used for scuba diving, swimming, and recreational activities along its white sandy beaches. Among its recreational areas is China Herbal Park, a coastal park covering approximately 4 km^{2}.

In 2020, Saudi Arabia's Ministry of Tourism announced plans to renovate the former residence of T. E. Lawrence in Yanbu. Lawrence, a British officer, lived in the city during World War I, and the restoration aims to preserve the site as a cultural and tourist attraction.

== Transportation ==
=== Airport ===
Yanbu is served by the Prince Abdulmohsen Bin Abdulaziz International Airport, which was upgraded in 2009. Domestically, it offers flights to Dammam, Jeddah, and Riyadh. International services connect Yanbu with Alexandria and Cairo in Egypt, Istanbul in Turkey, Dubai and Sharjah in the United Arab Emirates, and Doha in Qatar.

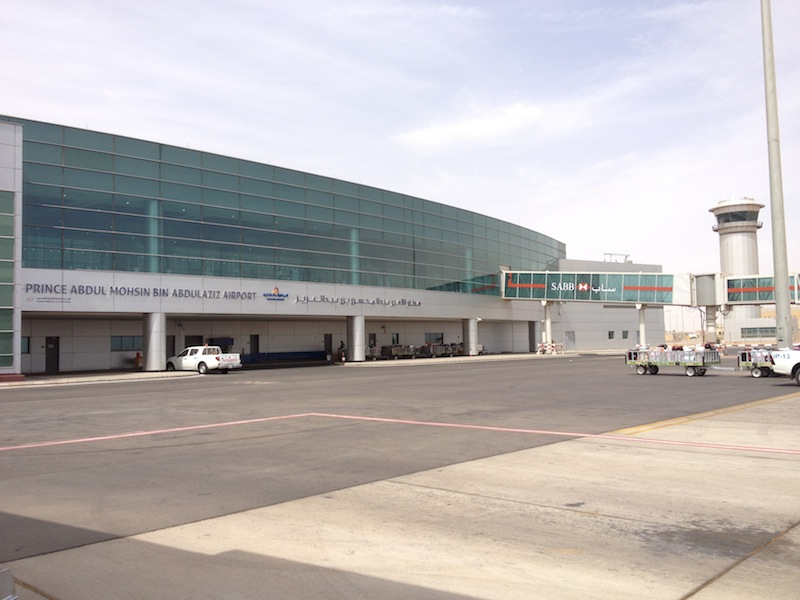
The new Yanbu Terminal and air traffic control tower (far right)

All international flights are operated by foreign carriers, while domestic services are provided by Saudia and Flynas.

=== Ports ===
Yanbu has the only two ports in the Medina Province: the Yanbu Commercial Port and the King Fahd Industrial Port. Both are managed by the Saudi Ports Authority.

Since the Strait of Hormuz crisis has begun in March 2026, the Saudi company Maaden aims to resolve the supply chain bottleneck caused by this crisis. It transports goods by rail and truck to Yanbu to ship them from there.

== See also ==
- Saudi Ports Authority
- 2004 Yanbu attack
- Capture of Yanbu (1811)
- Yanbu University College
- Yanbu Industrial College
- Radhwa International School
