= 2019 Afif attack =

2019 Houthi drone strike in Saudi Arabia

The 2019 Afif attack occurred in May of that year and was an attempt by the Houthi military power to harm Saudi Arabia's economic interests, specifically the East–West Crude Oil Pipeline. The Houthis flew seven drones in the attack on a pumping station at Afif, which is located in the greater region of Riyadh, 250 miles away from the capital. The targets are 800 kilometers north of the Saudi border with Yemen.

The attack was noted in a report issued by UN Secretary-General António Guterres on 9 June 2020 as part of his Iran arms embargo duties to the UNSC.

== See also ==
- 2026 East–West Crude Oil Pipeline attack
