= Yanbu Industrial College =

Technical college in Saudi Arabia

- Director: Dr. Fahad Aloufi
- Location: Yanbu Industrial City, Saudi Arabia; 23°59′6.73″N 38°12′9.04″E
- Website: http://www.rcyci.edu.sa/en/yic/

Yanbu Industrial College (Arabic: كلية ينبع الصناعية) is a technical college in Saudi Arabia. It was established in 1989 to achieve the objectives of the Royal Commission, in developing human resources and to provide the Saudi manpower with high technical education and training, so that they can properly manage the Kingdom's growing economy in its various sectors.

Yanbu Industrial College is located at the center of Yanbu Industrial City, about 350 km north of Jeddah on the Red Sea side.

YIC offers a range of technical and vocational programs at the diploma and bachelor's degree levels. The college has six academic departments, including Chemical Engineering Technology, Mechanical Engineering Technology, Electrical Engineering Technology, Information Technology, Business Administration, and Applied Sciences.

YIC has partnerships with leading companies and organizations in the industrial sector, both in Saudi Arabia and internationally. These partnerships provide students with opportunities to gain real-world experience through internships, apprenticeships, and other work-based learning programs.

== See also ==
- Higher Education in Saudi Arabia
- List of universities and colleges in Saudi Arabia
- Saudi Aramco
- Yanbu, Saudi Arabia
- Industrial City

== Sources ==
- YIC official website
- SPA
- ACBSP
