= College of Computer Science & Engineering at Yanbu =

College in Yanbu, Saudi Arabia

- كلية علوم وهندسة الحاسبات بينبع
- Type: Public
- Established: 2010
- Dean: Zuhair Malki
- Location: Yanbu, Saudi Arabia

College of Computer Science & Engineering at Yanbu (CCSEY) was established in Yanbu, Saudi Arabia, in 1430 Hejri, related to 2010, one of the Taibah University colleges in Yanbu branch, CCSEY is located in Yanbu AL-Bahar, in Medina Region, Yanbu the coastal city which is overlooking the Red Sea. the College offers diploma and undergraduate programs in different computer areas, the number of CCSEY students are nearly 500 students, 25 faculty members, and 25 employees.

In 2013 CCSEY started transferring into Learning organization to adapt to the Knowledge Society age, first through its Strategic Plan, and then by adopting the Cisco Networking Academy curriculum (In the academic year 2014-2015), in order to expand employment options for its graduates and help advance their careers.

== See also ==
- List of universities in Saudi Arabia
