= Charmutha =

Ancient Red Sea harbor

Charmutha (Χαρμουθᾶς), also Sharmutha was an ancient Arabian harbor located on the shores of the Red Sea, along the coasts of the Arabian Peninsula. Its exact position, between the city of Yanbu and the bay of Jeddha, is disputed.

According to Diodorus the Sicilian, Charmutha was one of the most renowned ports of antiquity. Its cothon resembled that of Carthage and consisted of two basins, the first rectangular, the second circular. It was large enough to accommodate 2,000 boats. There was a wooded island with the possibility of market gardening, fed by many freshwater canals.
