= King Abdulaziz Port =

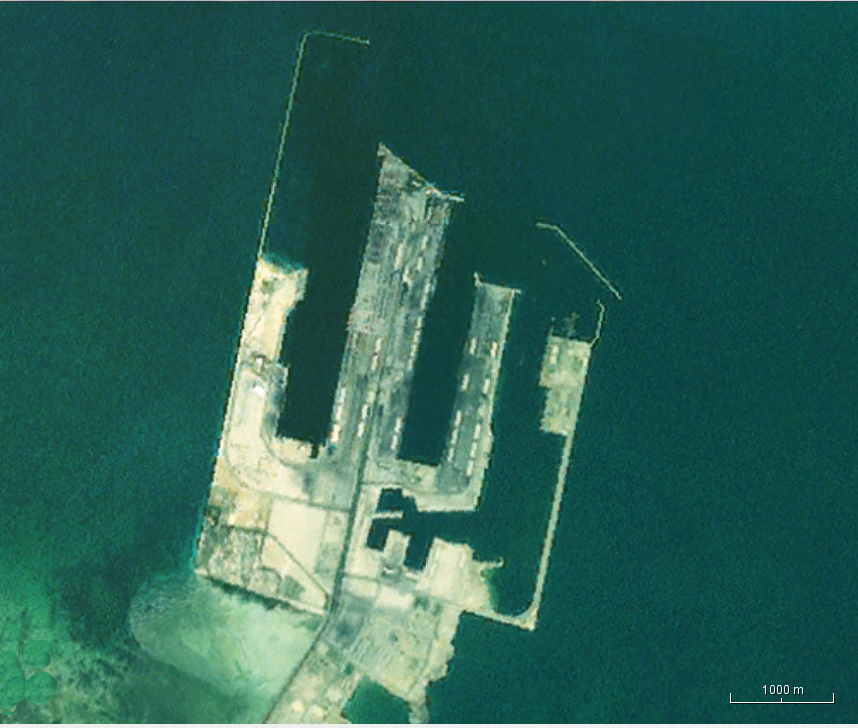
- Landsat view of the port.
- Interactive map of King Abdulaziz Port

Location
- Country: Saudi Arabia
- Location: Dammam, Eastern Province
- Coordinates: 26°29′19″N 50°12′4″E
- UN/LOCODE: SADMM

Details
- Owned by: Saudi Ports Authority
- Type of harbour: Coastal Breakwater
- Land area: 19,000 hectares (190 km^{2})
- No. of berths: 39
- Port Director General: Fahad Alamer

Statistics
- Vessel arrivals: 2,022 (1994)
- Annual cargo tonnage: 25.9 million (2011)
- Main exports: Petrochemicals, industrial products
- Main imports: Food and foodstuffs, construction materials, consumer goods
- Website mawani.gov.sa/en-us/saports/dammam/pages/default.aspx

King Abdulaziz Port, also known as Dammam Port, is a port in the city of Dammam, Saudi Arabia. It is the largest port in the Persian Gulf, and the third largest and third busiest port in the Middle East and North Africa (MENA) region, after the Jeddah Islamic Port. King Abdul Aziz Port is a major export center for the oil industry, and also a key distribution center for major landlocked cities in the country, particularly the capital cities of provinces, such as Riyadh which is linked to Dammam by a railway line.

The port is part of the Maritime Silk Road that runs from the Chinese coast to the south via the southern tip of India to Mombasa, from there through the Red Sea via the Suez Canal to the Mediterranean, there to the Upper Adriatic region to the northern Italian hub of Trieste with its rail connections to Central Europe, Eastern Europe and the North Sea.

Following the discovery of large oil reserves in the Eastern Province in 1938, the small coastal village of Dammam rapidly developed into a major regional city and important seaport. It became a centre for natural gas and petroleum reserves and the commercial hub of eastern Saudi Arabia. The majority of the modern city of Dammam and its suburbs were built after the 1940s. Rapid expansion brought the cities of Dammam and Khobar within a few minutes drive by the 1980s. Further population growth and economic expansion resulted in the cities of Dammam, Khobar and Dhahran being merged into the Dammam Metropolitan Area. Several major projects to develop the port were initiated in 2013.

Dammam port's facilities were expanded as part of Saudi Arabia's Second Five Year Plan (1975–80). Sixteen new piers were constructed at the port as part of the development. In 1975, the port imported 2.486 million tons of goods or about 40% of Saudi Arabia's total imports for that year. Imports through Dammam port reached 14.515 million tons in 1982. A total of 3,228 ships visited the port in 1987, and 7.322 million tons of goods were imported.

== Container terminals ==
There are two container terminals at the King Abdul Aziz Port. Both terminals operate 24 hours a day, with shift breaks, and breaks for meals and prayer.

The older terminal is operated by International Port Services (IPS), a subsidiary of Hutchison Port Holdings (HPH). The container terminal is a joint venture between HPH and the Saudi company Maritime Company for Navigation (MACNA). The IPS Terminal has three rail tracks and rail stacking area parallel to the tracks. All containers bound for the Riyadh Dry Port are directly shifted to the rail stack, where they are loaded on to freight trains.

The ground breaking ceremony for the second container terminal was held on 6 October 2012. The terminal opened in April 2015. The port unloaded 19.36 million tons in 2008, recording a 15.72% growth over the 16.73 million tons of unloaded tonnage the previous year. In 2008, Dammam handled 1.2-1.3 million TEUs or about 25% of all goods entering and exiting Saudi Arabia.

== Railway line ==
The Saudi Railways Organization's cargo line begins at the King Abdul Aziz Port and passes through Al-Ahsa, Abqaiq, Al-Kharj, Haradh and Al-Tawdhihiyah, before terminating at the dry port in Riyadh. The 556 kilometer line serves is a major transport route for goods arriving at Dammam to reach the Saudi Arabian capital of Riyadh.

Berths 4 to 13 of the King Abdul Aziz Port are connected to the rail system and are utilized for general cargo.
