= Taibah University =

University in Medina

- جامعة طيبة
- Type: Public
- Established: 10 July 2003; 23 years ago
- President: Dr. Nawal AlRasheed
- Location: taibah university, Saudi Arabia
- Website: www.taibahu.edu.sa

Taibah University (Arabic: جامعة طيبة) is a public research university located in Medina, Saudi Arabia established in 2003. Taibah University has witnessed an enormous increase in the number of its students (both male and female students). The university started as a branch of King Abdulaziz University (KAU) (Arabic: جامعة الملك عبد العزيز) in 1978. In 2003, there were 7,761 enrolled students. Today, there are 20,815 students enrolled.

When the Royal Decree was issued to transform the branches of King Abdulaziz University and the Imam Mohammad Ibn Saud Islamic University into a university, there were only 5 schools

- College of Education
- College of Science
- College of Computer Science and Engineering (CCSE)
- College of Engineering
- College of Medicine

Taibah University (Arabic: جامعة طيبة) was the first university in Saudi Arabia where Computer Science and Engineering was a standalone college and not a part of engineering or applied sciences programs and is also the first and only university in Medina that has a college of medicine as of 2026.

The university has a dedicated College of Islamic Sharia and Law, as well as several other departments that offer courses in Islamic studies and Arabic language. In addition, the university has a number of research centers and institutes that focus on Islamic and cultural studies.

Dr. Nawal al-Rasheed has been the director of Taibah University since November 1st, 2023.

== Academic programs and degrees ==
There are 156 academic programs, out of which 94 are graduate programs. The seven degrees awarded by Taibah University are Diploma, Associate, Bachelor's, General Diploma, Higher Diploma, Master's, and Doctorate.

== Establishment ==
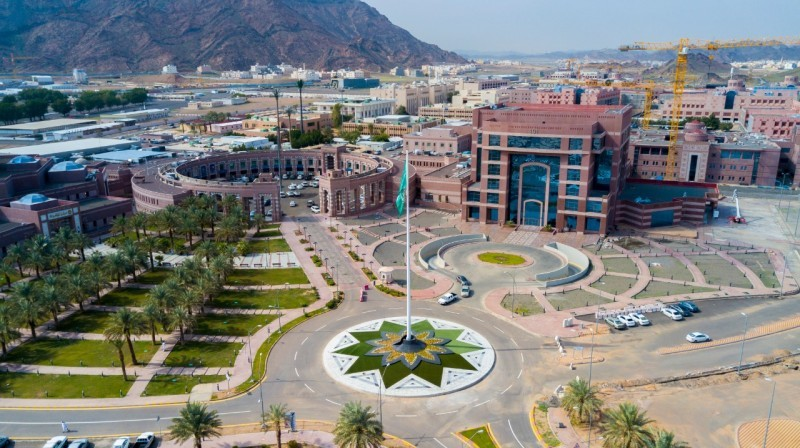
University campus

Royal Decree number 22042 was issued to convey the Council of Higher Education's decision to integrate the campuses of Muhammad bin Saud University and King Abdulaziz University into one independent university in Medina.

== Schools ==
Taibah University includes 28 colleges:

- College of Medicine Rehabilitation Sciences
- College of Applied Medical Sciences
- College of Pharmacy
- College of Dentistry
- College of Medicine
- College of Law
- College Business Administration
- College of Applied Medical Sciences, AL-Ola
- College of Engineering
- College of Computer Science and Engineering (CCSE)
- College of Science
- College of Education
- College of Arts and Humanities
- College of Arts and Humanities, Yanbu
- College of Applied Science
- College of Community Services
- Community College - Khaybar
- College of Health Sciences
- College of Family Sciences
- College of Sciences, Yanbu
- College of Engineering, Yanbu
- College of Science & Computer Engineering, Yanbu
- College of Applied Medical Sciences – (Yanbu Campus)
- College of Business Administration, Yanbu
- College Of Science and Arts at Al-Ola

== Publications ==
It publishes the Journal of Taibah University for Sciences (IF: 1.863). It is being published from 2006 by Elsevier.

== See also ==
- List of universities in Saudi Arabia
