= Abqaiq oil field =

Oil field in Saudi Arabia

Coordinates: 25.9333°N 49.6667°E

Abqaiq
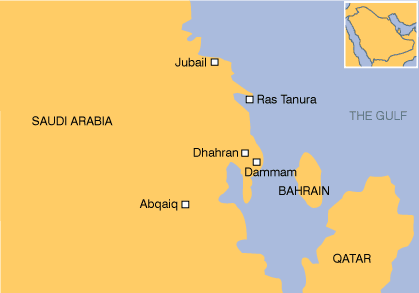

- Location within Saudi Arabia
- Country: Saudi Arabia
- Region: Eastern Province
- Offshore/onshore: onshore
- Operator: Saudi Aramco

Field history
- Discovery: 1940
- Start of production: 1940

Production
- Estimated oil in place: 3020 million tonnes (~ 3.58×10^{9} m^{3} or 22500 million bbl)

The Abqaiq oil field is an oil field located in Eastern Province. It was discovered in 1940 and developed by Saudi Aramco. It began production in 1940 and produces oil. The total proven reserves of the Abqaiq oil field are around 22.5 billion barrels (3.020 billion tonnes), and production is centered on 400,000 barrels per day (64,000 m^{3}/d). Much of its production is carried through the East-West Crude Oil Pipeline.
