= King Fahd Industrial Port (Jubail) =

King Fahad Industrial Port (Jubail)

Location
- Country: Saudi Arabia
- Location: Jubail, Red Sea
- Coordinates: 27°1′N 49°40′E
- UN/LOCODE: SAKFH

Details
- Owned by: Saudi Ports Authority
- No. of berths: 34

Statistics
- Website www.ports.gov.sa

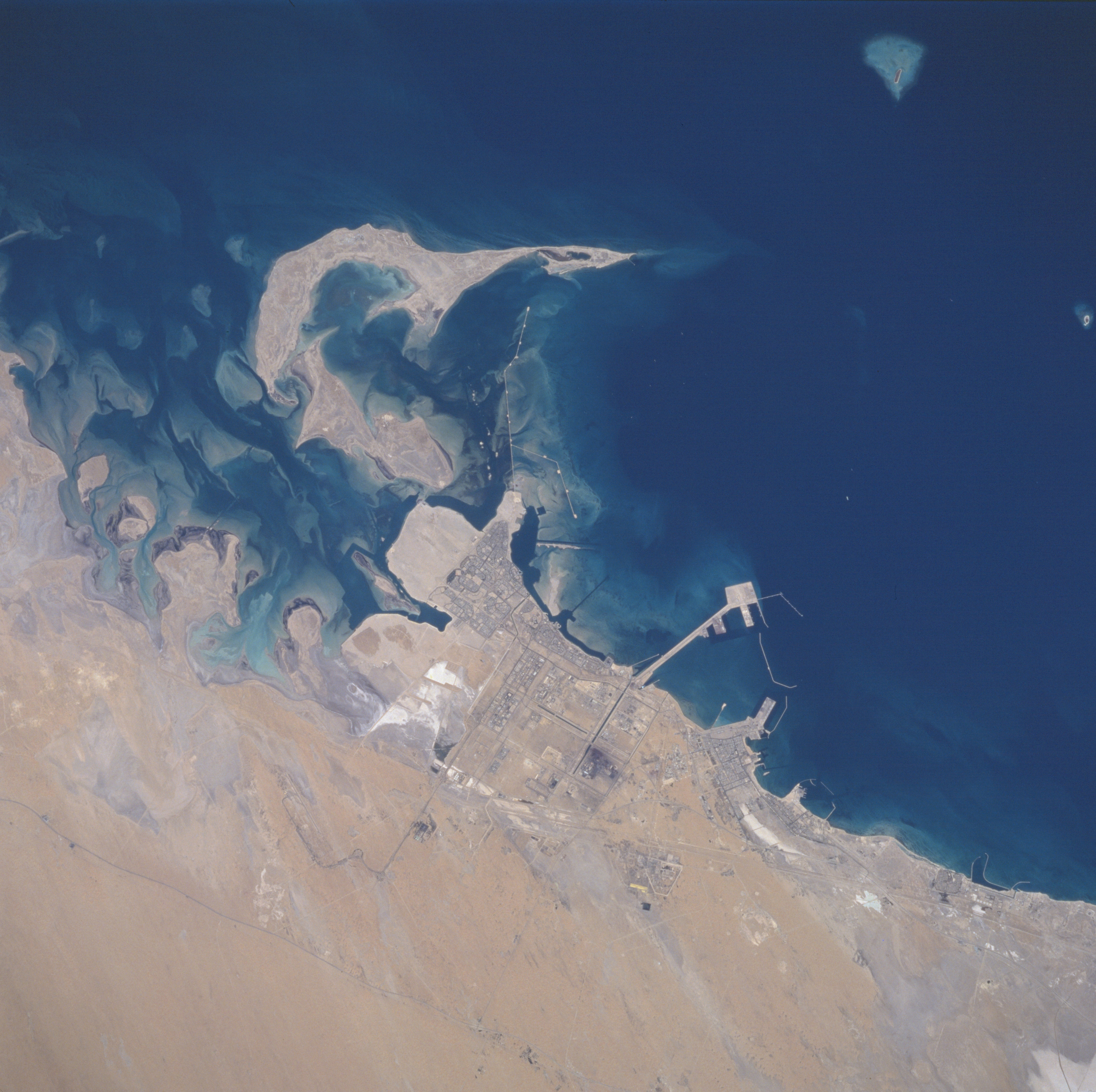
An aerial view of al-Jubayl Port

The King Fahad Industrial Port (Jubail) is a Saudi port located in Jubail city of Saudi Arabia. The port was established in 1974 to serve Jubail Industrial city and now is considered as one of the largest industrial ports in the world.

== Specification ==
King Fahad Industrial Port in Jubail has 34 berths with a capacity of 70 million tons per year. There are five terminals in the port; General Cargo Terminal, Marine Equipment, Bulk Cargo Terminal, Petrochemical & Petroleum products Terminal, and Open Sea Tanker Terminal.

== See also ==
- Saudi Ports Authority
