= Saudi Ports Authority =

Government agency of Saudi Arabia

Saudi Ports Authority الهيئة العامة للموانئ
- Formation: 1976; 50 years ago
- Type: Port authority
- Headquarters: MAWANI Building, Al-Dhabab Street, Riyadh
- Region served: Saudi Arabia
- President: Suliman bin Khalid Almazroua
- Budget: SAR 1.710 billion (US$456 million)
- Website: Official Website (English)

Saudi Ports Authority (MAWANI) (Arabic: الهيئة العامة للموانئ) is a government agency that supervises the ports of Saudi Arabia. It was founded in 1976 as an independent agency of the Prime Minister's office, to bring together the governance and operations of the multiple ports of the country to one office. Over time the actual operation of the ports was devolved by government contract to independent port operating companies.

== Ports ==
The Saudi Ports Authority (MAWANI) supervises the following major commercial and industrial ports in Saudi Arabia:

- Jeddah Islamic Port
- King Abdulaziz Port
- King Fahd Industrial Port (Yanbu)
- King Fahd Industrial Port (Jubail)
- Jubail Commercial Port
- Yanbu Commercial Port
- Jazan Port
- Neom Port
- Ras Al-khair Port
- king Abdullah port

== See also ==
- Transport in Saudi Arabia
- Saudi Red Sea Authority
- Port authority
- Port operator
- Oil tanker
