= Yanbu University College =

Public university in Yanbu Al-Sinaiyah, Saudi Arabia

- كلية ينبع الجامعية
- Former name: University College - Yanbu
- Type: Public
- Established: 2005; 21 years ago
- Director: Dr. Sameer Ali Alsibiani
- DMD (Academic): Dr. Samir Alsobhi
- Location: (Saudi Arabia) Yanbu, Al-Medina Province, Saudi Arabia
- Nickname: YUC
- Website: http://www.rcyci.edu.sa/en/yuc-m

Yanbu University College (YUC) is a public university located in Yanbu Al-Sinaiyah, Saudi Arabia. YUC is a non-profitable government institution founded in 2005 by the Royal Commission for Jubail and Yanbu. It offers bachelor degrees in the fields of Management Science, Computer Science, Information Technology, Interior Design Engineering and Applied Linguistics.

== Academics ==
The medium of instruction in undergraduate programs is English.

The grading system is the standard Grade Point Average (GPA) 0 to 4.0 scale with classes of:

Grade	Letter Grade	GPA
Exceptional	A+	4.00
Excellent	A	3.75
Superior	B+	3.50
Very Good	B	3.00
Above Average	C+	2.50
Good	C	2.00
High-Pass	D+	1.50
Pass	D	1.00
Fail	F	0.0

Applicants are required to pass an English examination to determine the level of English course they are going to have in their preparation year.

=== Admission ===
For how Yanbu University college (male campus) calculate their balanced score, it comprises 50% for the high school certificate and 50% for the general capabilities test.

As for YUC (female campus), the balanced score comprises 20% for high school certificate, 30% general capabilities test, and 50% for the collective test performances (test of high school's maths, physics, chemistry and Biology). Both the general capabilities test and the collective test are evaluated by Qiyas.

=== Library ===
The libraries in YUC (Male and Female Campuses) which are located to all classrooms as well as the laboratories and it is an “open-stack” library, that allows students and faculty members free access to its resources.

The current number of books (hard copy) for YUC (male campus) is 4500 books, and for YUC (female campus) is 3200 books, categorized in computer science, computer engineering, social science, applied science, religion, accounting, management science, languages and literature and reference collection books. Also the library has over 600,000 total e-sources like e-books/e-journals (Arabic) 100,000, for the e-journals (English) 3,204 and for e-books database (English) 533,449.

Also the seating capacity for YUC (male campus) is 81, and for the female campus is 225.

== Campus life ==
=== Student clubs ===
==== Yanbu University college (Male Campus) ====
- Computer Club
- Supply Chain Club

==== Yanbu University College (Female Campus) ====
- Ata’a Club
- Computer Club
- Ghars Club
- Management Club
- Toastmasters Club
- Design Club
- Translation Club
- Fashionista Club
- Culture Club
- English Express Club
- Photography Club
- Sports Club
- Fun House Club
- Happiness Club

== Academic Departments ==
There are two departments of the Yanbu University College (Male), and four departments for Yanbu University College (Female) that offer degree programs, each with its own internal structure and activities. Teaching at YUC male and female is structured around these departments of study. A student is registered in one of the departments depending on the program the student is interested in pursuing. In addition to these departments, the Department of General Studies and Yanbu English Language Institute (YELI) offer courses which students need to take in order to complete their degrees.

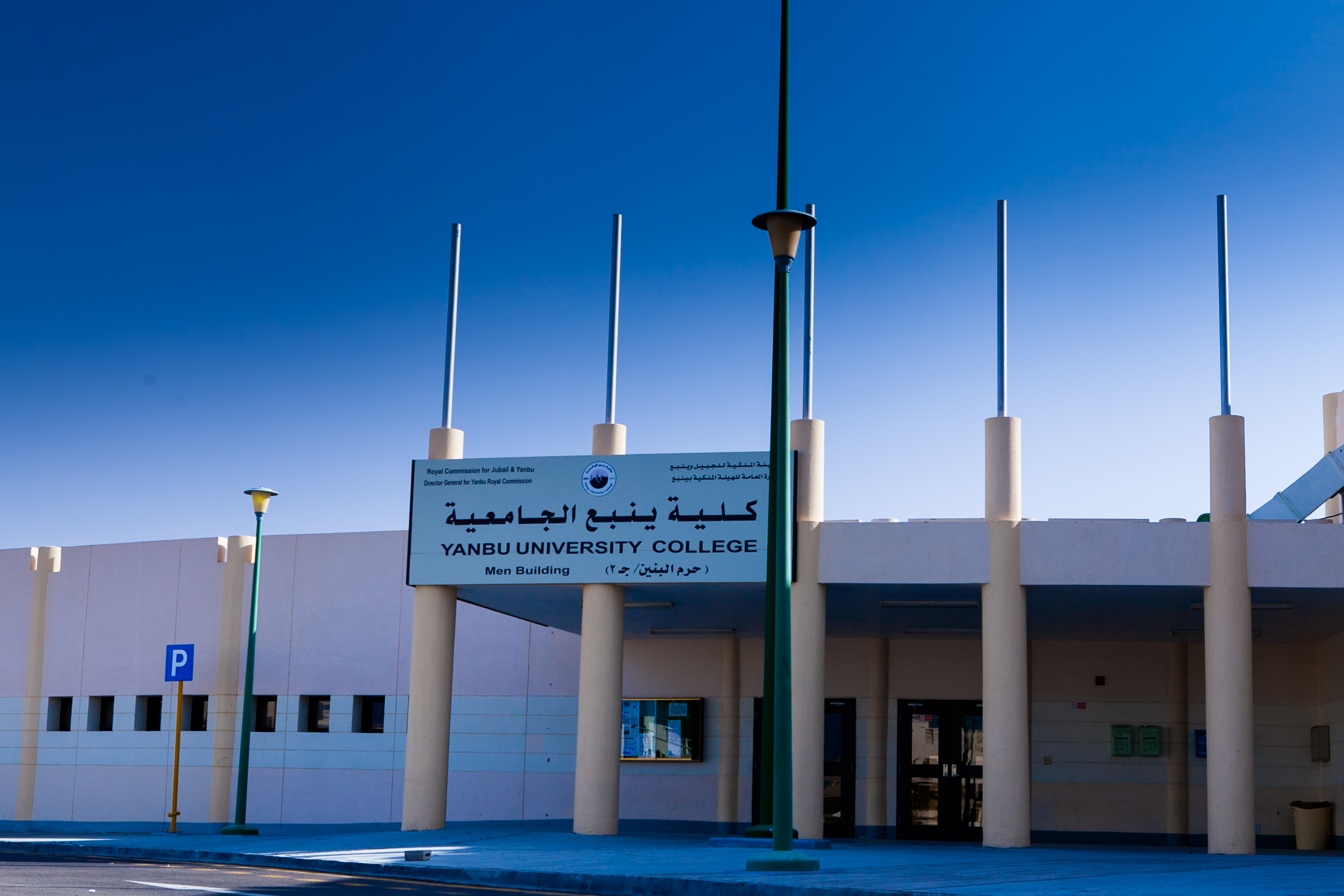
Yanbu University College (Male Campus)

=== Yanbu University College (Male Campus) ===
==== Department of Computer Science and Engineering ====
- BS in Computer Engineering
- BS in Computer Science
- AD in Information and Computing Technology

==== Department of Management Sciences ====
- BS in Management Information System
- BS in Business Management (HRM)
- BS in Business Management (Marketing)
- BS in Accounting
- BS in Business Management (Supply Chain Management)
- AD in Office Management Technology
- AD in Material Management Technology
- AD in Accounting and Financial Management Technology

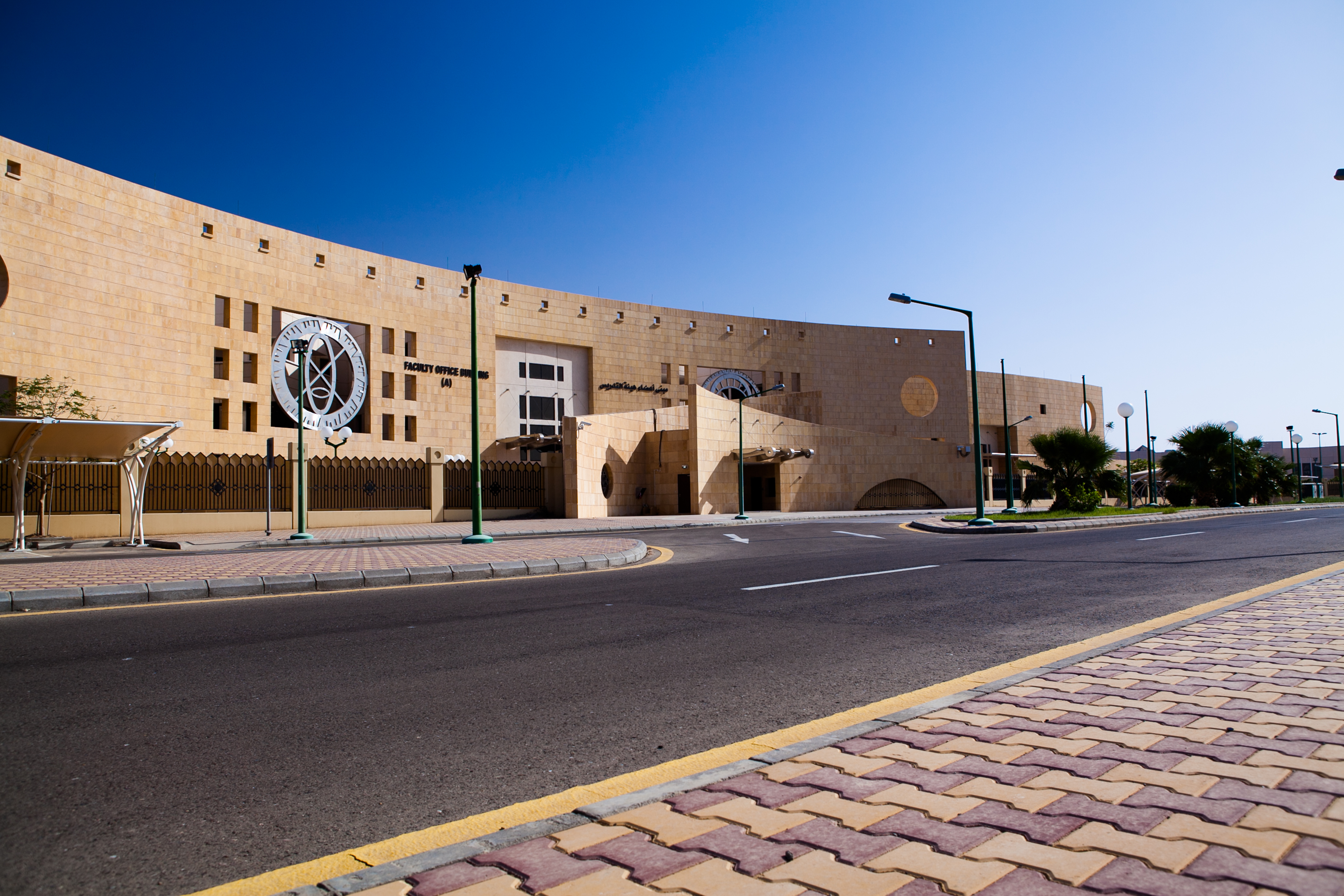
Yanbu University College (Female Campus)

=== Yanbu University College (Female Campus) ===
==== Management Science ====
- BS-Management Information System
- BS-Accounting
- BS -Business Management (Human Resources Management)

==== Applied Linguistics ====
- Bachelor of Science in Applied Linguistics

==== Internal Design Engineering ====
- Bachelor of Science in Interior Design Engineering

=== Computer Science and Engineering ===
- BS in Computer Science
- BS in Computer Engineering

== Accreditations And Alignments ==
Yanbu University College, Management Science Department got first accreditation by ACBSP in 2006 for their diploma programs. In 2016 Management Science Department got the certificate of the renewal of the previous accreditations, and This time the BS programs also got accredited. The full list of Accredited programs are as follows:

- BS in Management Information System
- BS in Business Management (Human Resource Management)
- BS in Business Management (Marketing)
- BS in Accounting
- BS in Business Management (Supply Chain Management)
- AD in Office Management Technology
- AD in Material Management Technology
- AD in Accounting and Financial Management Technology

Yanbu University College has been implementing Quality Management system in all of its academic areas. And the acknowledgment of these quality management system awarded ISO 9001-2008 standard to YUC in 2014.

Accreditations underway:

- NCAAA
- ABET

Alignment of academic programs to professional bodies:

- BS in BM (HRM) program is aligned to SHRM (Society of Human Resources Management)
- BS in BM (Supply Chain Management) program is aligned to CILT (Chartered Institute of Logistics and Transport)
- BS in BM (Accounting) program is aligned with SOCPA (Saudi Organization for Certified Public Accountants)

== See also ==
- List of universities and colleges in Saudi Arabia
