= Jeddah Islamic Port =

Largest port of Saudi Arabia

- Interactive map of Jeddah Islamic Port

Location
- Country: Saudi Arabia
- Location: Jeddah, Makkah Province
- Coordinates: 21°29′1.8348″N 39°10′24.2646″E

Details
- Opened: 646 A.D.
- Owned by: Saudi Ports Authority
- Type of Harbor: Terminal
- Size: Large
- No. of berths: 62 (2023)

Statistics
- Annual cargo tonnage: 130 million
- Website mawani.gov.sa/ports

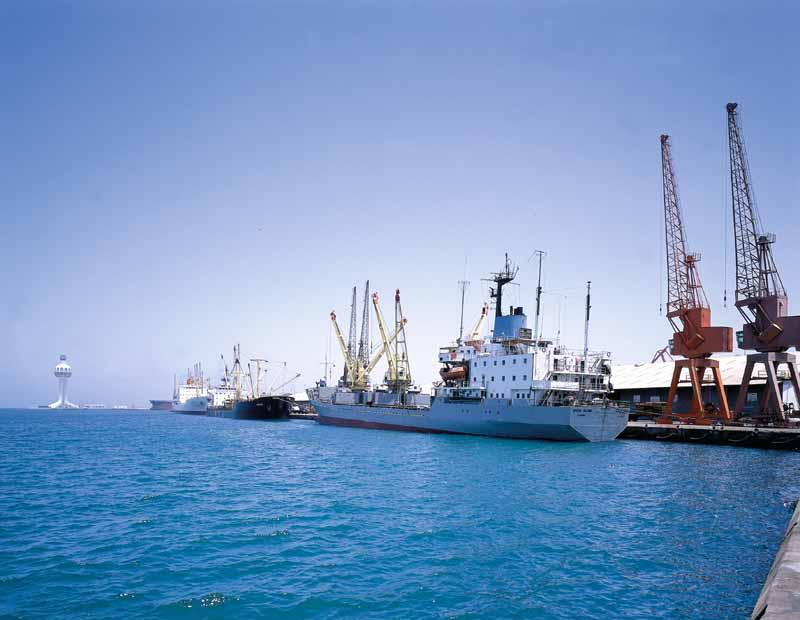
A general view of the seaport

Jeddah Islamic Port is a Saudi Arabian port, located in Jeddah on the Red Sea, at the middle of an international shipping route between the east and west via the Suez Canal. It is the second-largest and second-busiest port in the Arab world (after the Port of Jebel Ali in Dubai, UAE). The city of Jeddah is the second-largest city in Saudi Arabia (after the capital Riyadh), and is Saudi Arabia's commercial capital.

== Overview ==
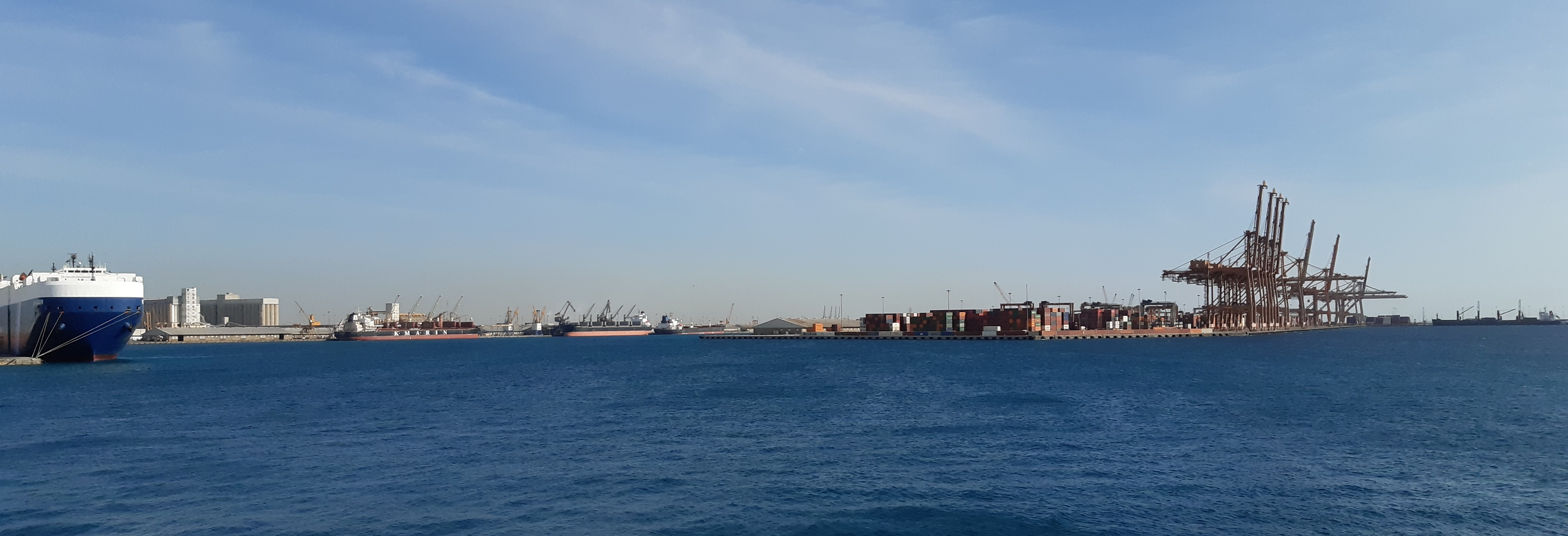
Jeddah Islamic Port

The port lies on Saudi Arabia's Red Sea coast. It is the principal port serving the holy cities of Mecca and Medina. The port serves the commercial centres through which 65% of Saudi Arabia's imports by sea are being handled. The importance of Jeddah Port increased and reached its maximum limit when Saudi Arabia was developing into a modern country.

The port was established in 646 A.D. during the reign of the Caliph Uthman ibn Affan, and today has 62 berths in service. It occupies an area of 12 square kilometers and its deep water quays provide an overall berthing length of 11.2 kilometers with a maximum draft of 16 metres. The port can accommodate the latest generation of large container vessels with a capacity of 19,800 TEUs.

Jeddah Seaport is the western terminus of the Saudi Landbridge Project, the eastern terminus being Dammam.

The port is part of the 21st Century Maritime Silk Road that runs from the Chinese coast to Singapore, towards the southern tip of India to Mombasa, from there through the Red Sea via the Suez Canal to the Mediterranean, there to the Upper Adriatic region to the northern Italian hub of Trieste with its connections to Central Europe and the North Sea.

In order to improve the operating efficiency of the seaport, three new ships-to-shore cranes have been added.

== See also ==
- Mecca
- Red Sea
