= Tarout Castle =

- قلعة تاروت
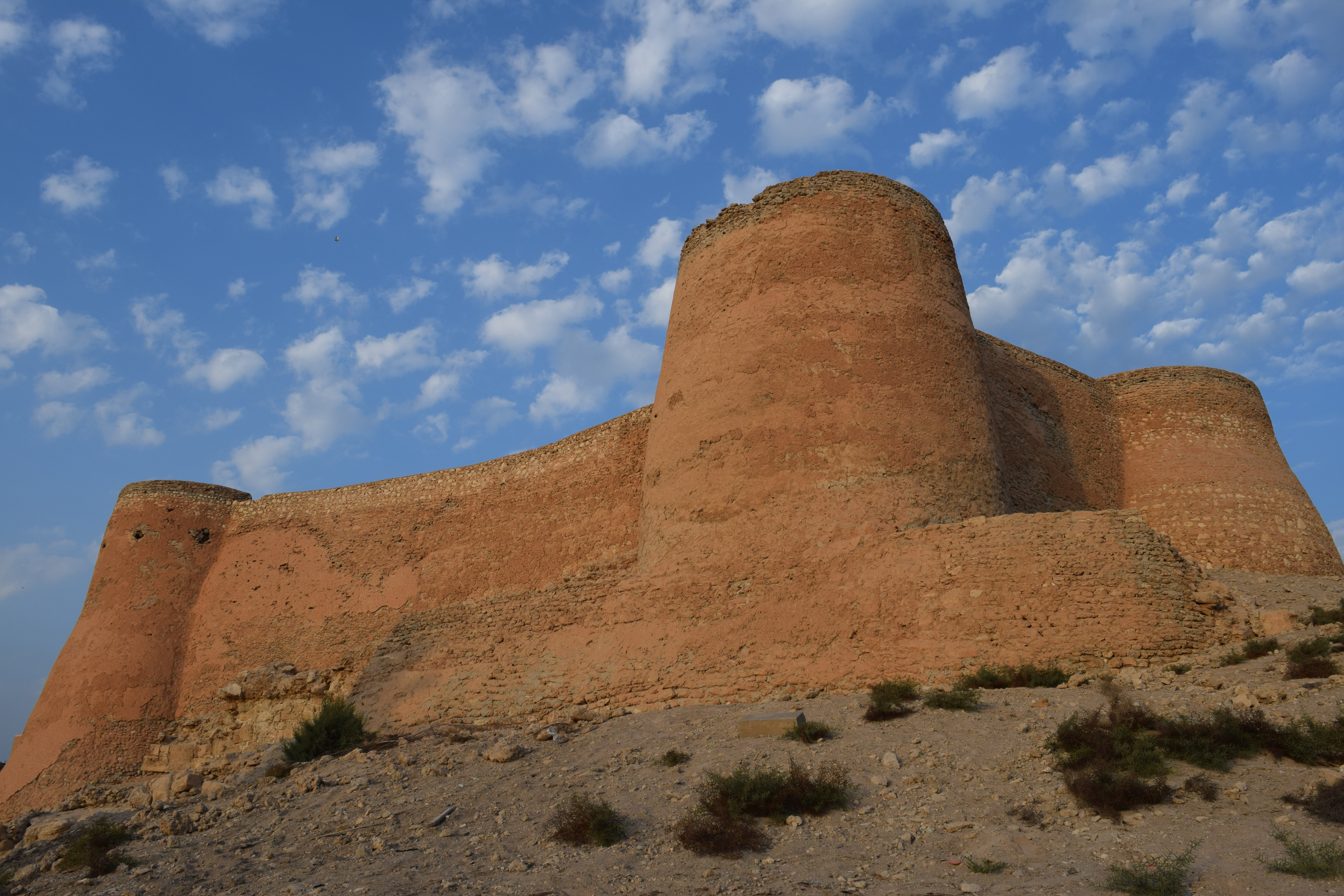
- The north part of the castle, September 2016
- Interactive map of the Tarout Castle area

General information
- Location: Tarout Island, Qatif, Saudi Arabia
- Coordinates: 26°34′09″N 50°04′06″E

Tarout Castle (Arabic: قلعة تاروت, romanized: Qalʿat Tārūt), also known as Tarut Palace, Tarut Fort, Portuguese Fort, is an archaeological site in Qatif, Saudi Arabia. It is situated on a hill in the center of Tarut Island, located southwest of Deira, in the eastern part of Qatif Governorate, Saudi Arabia. The hill, known as Tall Tawt, is estimated to be 5,000 years old. The castle itself is believed to date back to the time of the Uyuni state and was later used as a Portuguese defensive point.

The Portuguese renovated the castle in the 16th century, specifically on 29 March 1544 CE (1 Jumada al-Awwal 951 AH), during their occupation of the Persian Gulf. The fort was constructed on the remains of a temple dedicated to the Phoenician goddess Astarte or Inanna, from whom the name "Tarut Island" is derived. The ruins and foundations of the original temple remain visible beneath the castle.

Several statues and pottery pieces dating back to earlier periods have been discovered within Tarut Castle, including artifacts from the Sumer era, the Fatimid Caliphate, and the Dilmun civilization. However, the castle is currently facing several challenges, the structural cracking of its towers, which poses a risk of collapse. Additionally, the drying up of Ain al-Awda, a spring located within the castle, has been attributed to continuous oil extraction in the area. The castle remains closed to the public and is not officially open for visitors or tourists.

Nevertheless, Tarut Castle continues to attract interest from foreign researchers and expeditions, including the Danish archaeological expedition and the renowned researcher Jeffrey Beebe.

== Etymology ==
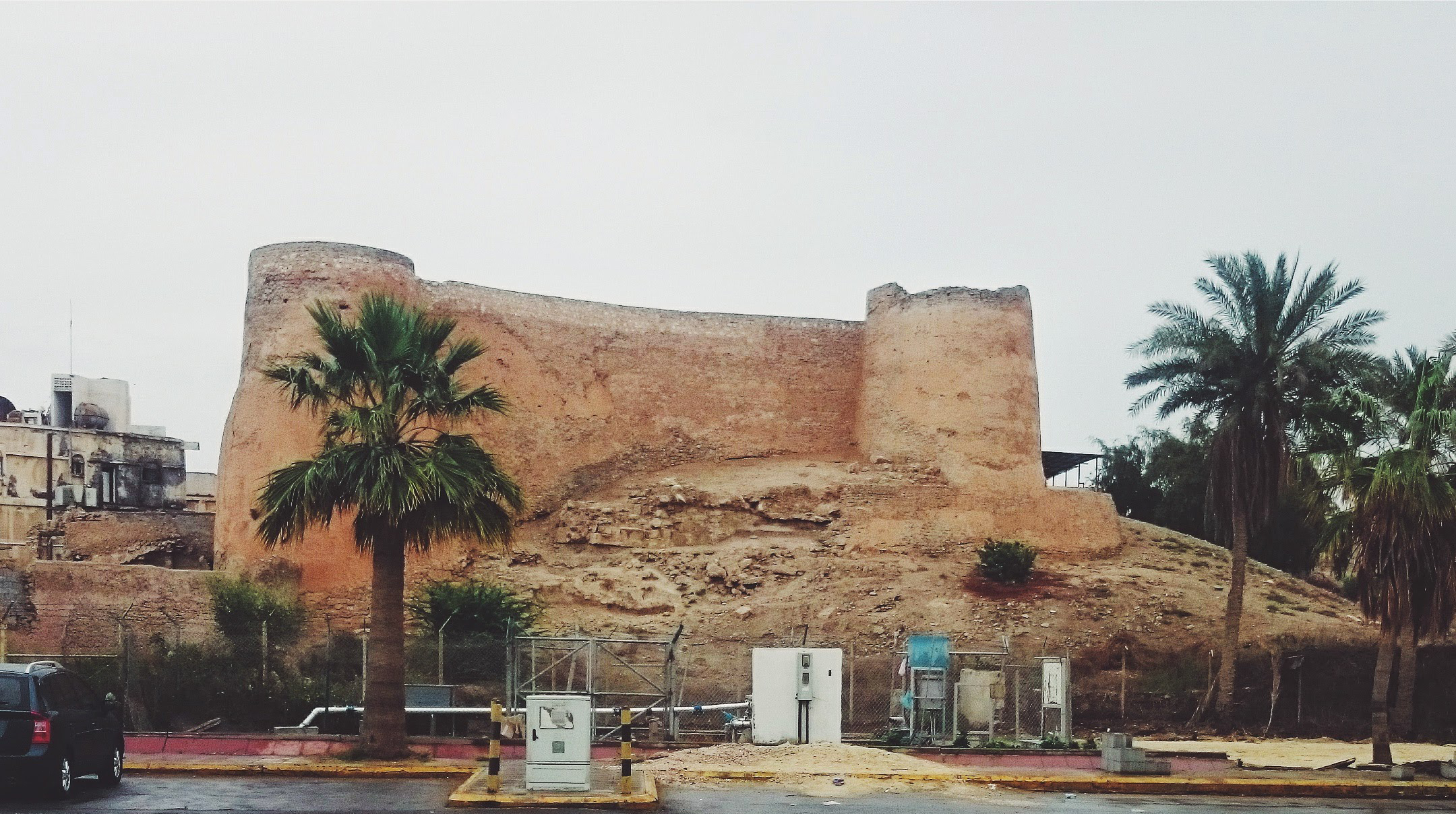
The western aspect of Tarut Castle, as observed on the 23rd of March, 2015.

The castle is often referred to as the Portuguese Fort due to its association with Portuguese conquerors, but it is also known as Tarut Castle, named after the site on which it was constructed. The name "Tarut" is derived from the Sumerian goddess Inanna, whose earliest appearances date back more than 5,000 years, recorded in cuneiform inscriptions in Sumer, southern Iraq. Inanna was symbolized by the octagram, which was used to represent the planet Venus. Over time, her worship spread from the Sumerians to the Akkadians, who called her Ishtar, and later to the peoples of southern Arabia, who referred to her as Athar or Attar. The Canaanites and Hebrews knew her as Ashra or Astarte.

The exact reason for the name Tarut is unclear. It may be linked to the construction of a temple dedicated to Ishtar on the site or because the region was historically known as Tarut, reflecting a strong connection between the environment and the goddess during that time. The ancient inhabitants of the island believed that the goddess Ishtar played a role in agriculture and water supply. Given the island's fertility and abundance of water, these beliefs likely shaped their view of Ishtar.

According to legend, the people of ancient Tarut envisioned the goddess as a beautiful young woman who wandered gracefully through the palm groves. As she moved, springs of water would flow behind her, nurturing the land and ensuring bountiful crops. For them, Ishtar was the goddess of fertility, love, and sex. Supporting this belief is the discovery of a pure gold statue representing Ishtarot in one of the island's groves, symbolizing the goddess's importance to the island's ancient culture.

== Geography ==
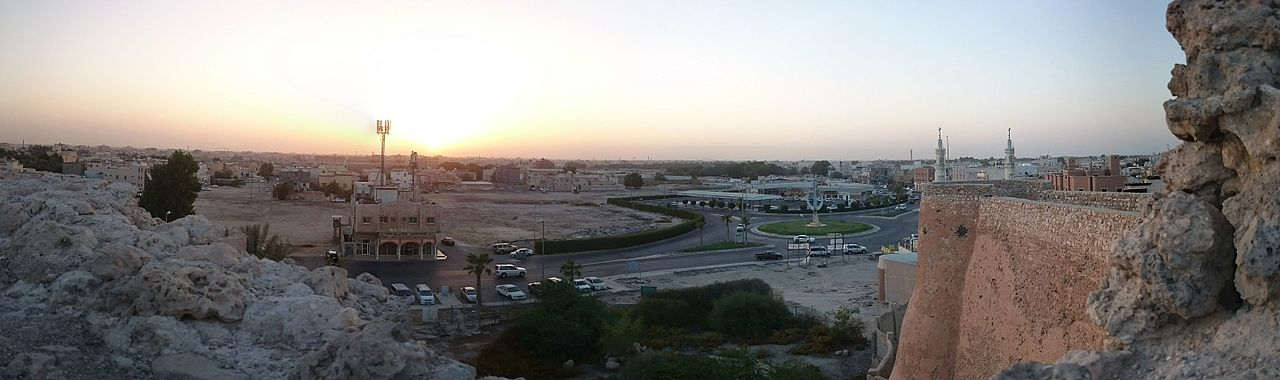
The view from one of the castle's towers.

Tarut Castle is located northwest of the Deira neighborhood on Tarut Hill, in the center of Tarut Island, within the Qatif Governorate in eastern Saudi Arabia. The castle's strategic position was intended to serve as an impregnable fortress, offering protection to the Deira neighborhood in the event of external threats or attacks.

== Archaeology ==
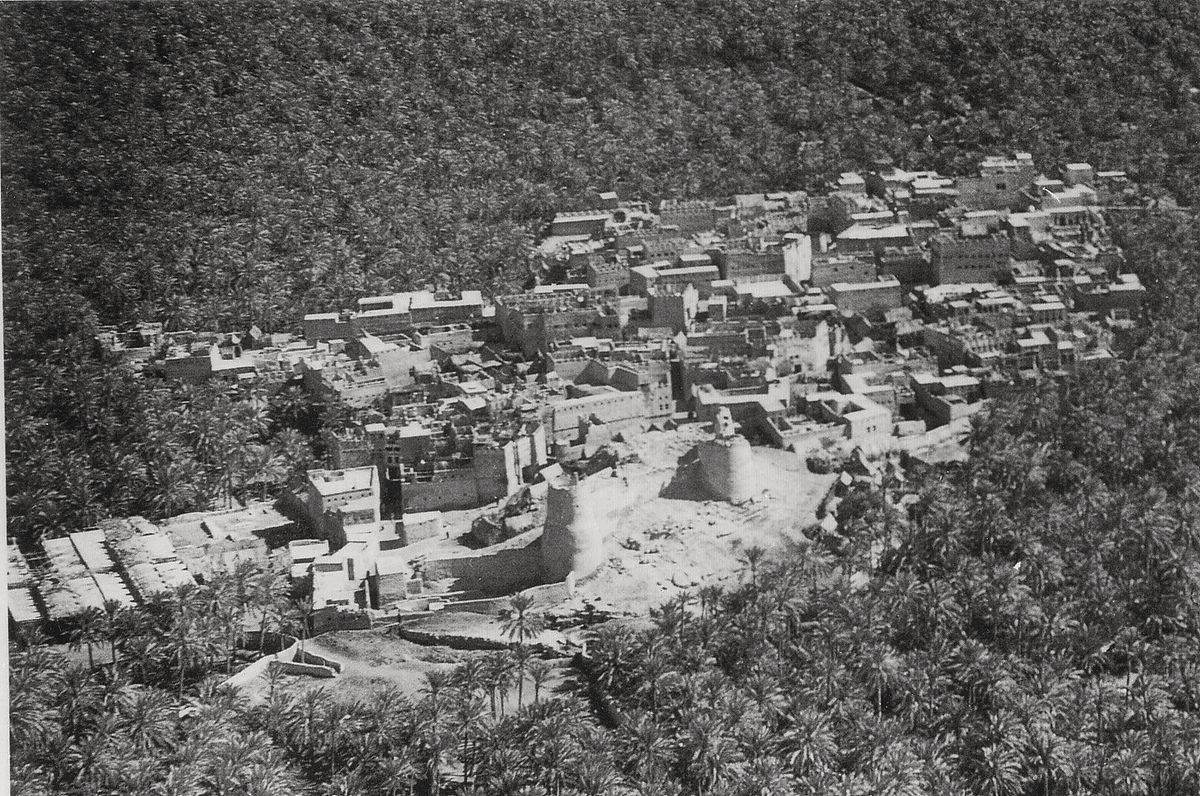
Aerial view of Deira neighborhood with Tarut Castle in the foreground, date unknown.

Archaeological excavations at Tarut Hill indicate that settlement began as early as the Ubaid period in the fifth millennium BC and continued until the third millennium BC, making it one of the oldest inhabited sites in the Arabian Peninsula. The limited size of the hill and the presence of a prominent fortress suggest that Tarut was more than just a village. Field surveys have shown that the hill is composed of a mixture of clay, dust, and large limestone fragments. Beneath the foundations of the citadel, evidence of ancient structures from the third millennium BC has been uncovered, including monolithic and polished stone pieces, believed to be remnants of an ancient building or multiple structures.

The archaeological findings are distributed across four distinct historical periods, representing different stages of settlement on the site. The oldest remains date back to the second Ubaid period (4300–4000 BC), with continuous habitation until the third millennium BC, a time marked by the rise of the Dilmun civilization during the late Barbar period. The historical span of the castle's existence is therefore estimated to range between 4300 BC and 500 BC.

The King Abdulaziz Darat holds numerous artifacts unearthed from the Tarut Fort archaeological site, including a golden statue of Ashtarot, discovered in one of the palm groves on Tarut Island. A wide range of items has been excavated in Tarut, such as statues, copper and pottery vessels, and traditional weapons. Notably, a bowl from the Indus Valley civilization, currently exhibited at the National Museum of Riyadh. The most recent discovery is an ancient war cannon, now displayed at the Dammam Regional Museum.

One of the most important discoveries is a limestone statue found beneath the foundations of Tarut Castle. The statue, which bears characteristics of Sumerian civilization art, depicts a standing, bare-bodied man, measuring 94 cm in height, with his hands crossed in a reverential posture. Three belt-like symbols are carved around the waist. The statue is dated to the Dawn of the Second or Third Dynasties, in the middle of the third millennium BC. It is speculated that the statue may have been a gift from a Mesopotamian to a prominent figure in the Dilmun civilization, symbolizing friendship and goodwill.

In the lower layers of the Tarut Castle mound, archaeologists made a significant discovery: large pottery vessels with triangular bodies and rims, characteristic of the Jemdet Nasr civilization (3100–2900 BC) from the Mesopotamian Valley. Additionally, orange-yellow pottery from the Dawn of the Dynasties period (2900–2350 BC) was unearthed beneath the castle's foundations.

Pottery from the third millennium BC, known as Dilmun pottery, has also been confirmed through field surveys and excavations at Qal'at Tarut Hill. The Dilmun pottery found in the Eastern Province shows a wide variety of forms, including cylindrical, bell-shaped, and ribbed jars with deep, semi-straight sides, as well as smaller vessels such as curved-sided plates and cups. These artifacts highlight the diversity and craftsmanship of the region's ancient civilizations.

== General design ==
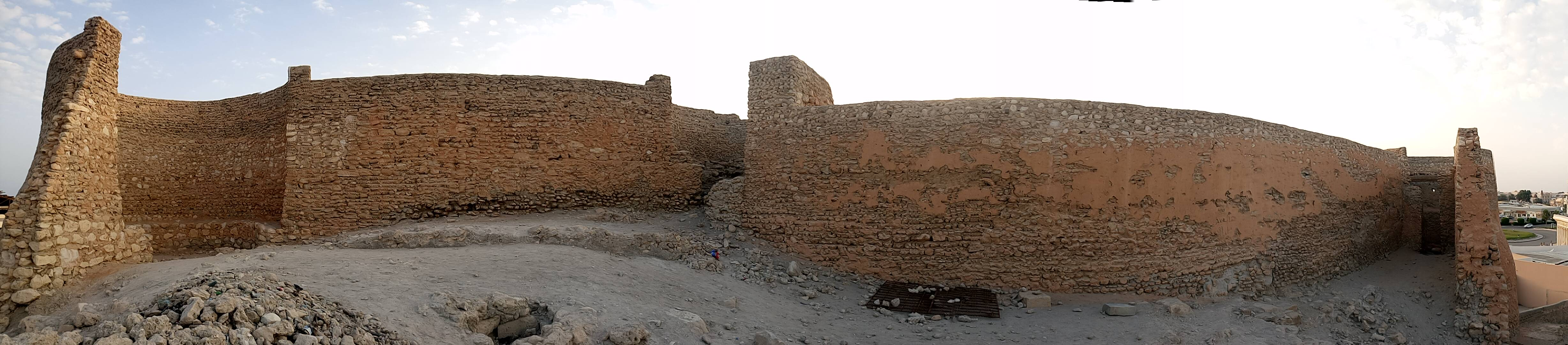
An interior view of the castle showing the corridors between the three towers.

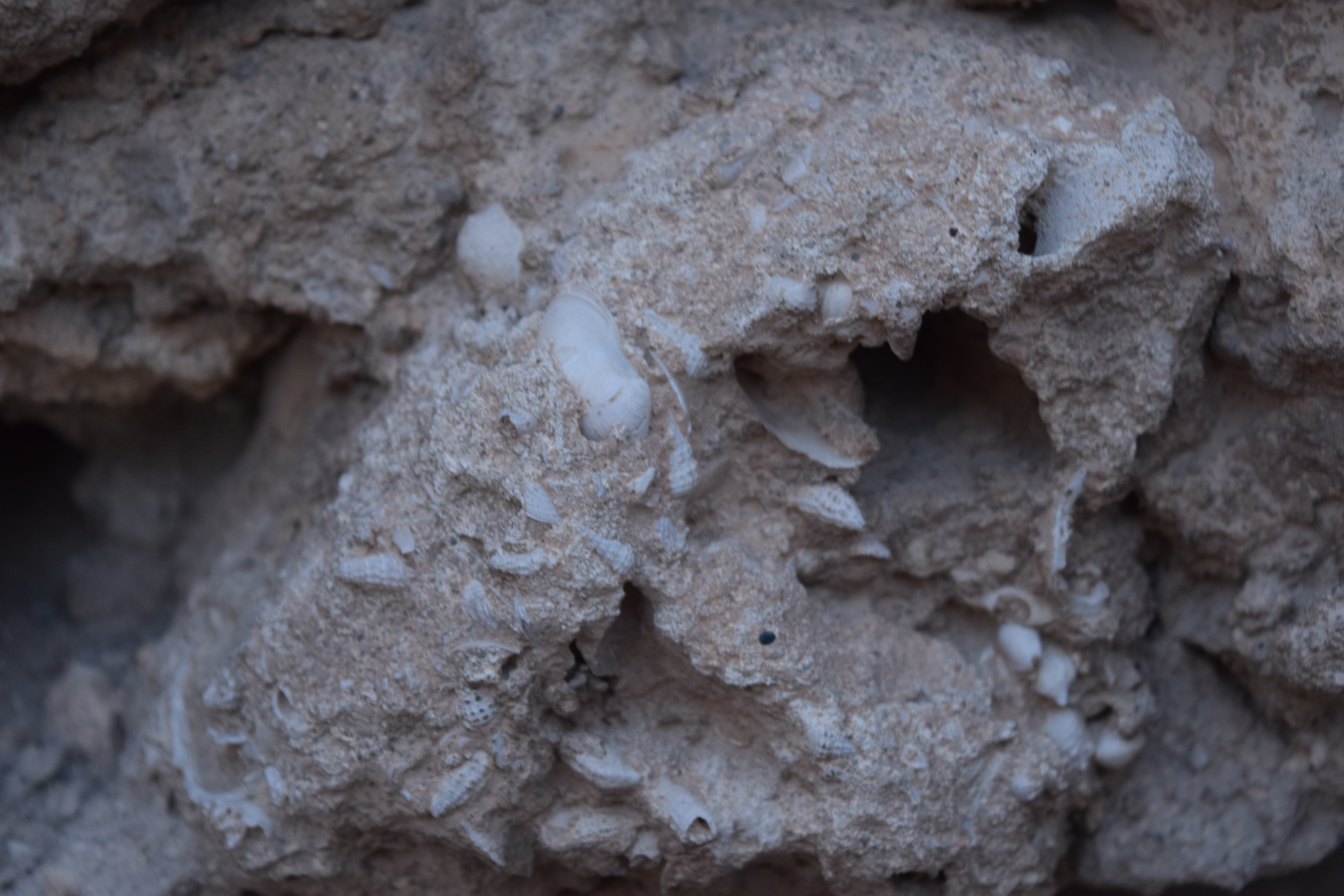
A castle stone showing the composition of the material used to build the castle, a marine clay stone called furosh stone.

Tarut Castle consists of four towers, constructed to emulate the natural topography of the surrounding area. This architectural approach closely resembles the Portuguese construction methods seen in irregularly shaped Omani castles. The courtyard of the castle is nearly oval, bordering on rectangular, with a deep well at its center. It is surrounded by a thick wall made from mud, plaster, bedding stones, and sticky, unburned mud mortar. The castle's design is often compared to the shape of a crab, with walls ranging in thickness from 1.5 to 2.5 meters and reaching a height of 9 meters.

The castle originally featured eleven tall towers connected by extended bridges, which were used as secret passages during wartime. However, only three of these towers remain today. In its earlier years, Tarut Castle served as a fortification for soldiers and as a storage site for ammunition. It also housed a headquarters or office for the governor, as well as a central water well, which was likely used for storing supplies during sieges. Soldiers stationed at the castle were provided with water and dates.

In times of danger, the soldiers used a signaling system by lighting fires within the castle. During the day the smoke would signal imminent danger, and at night the flames would serve as a warning.

=== Towers ===
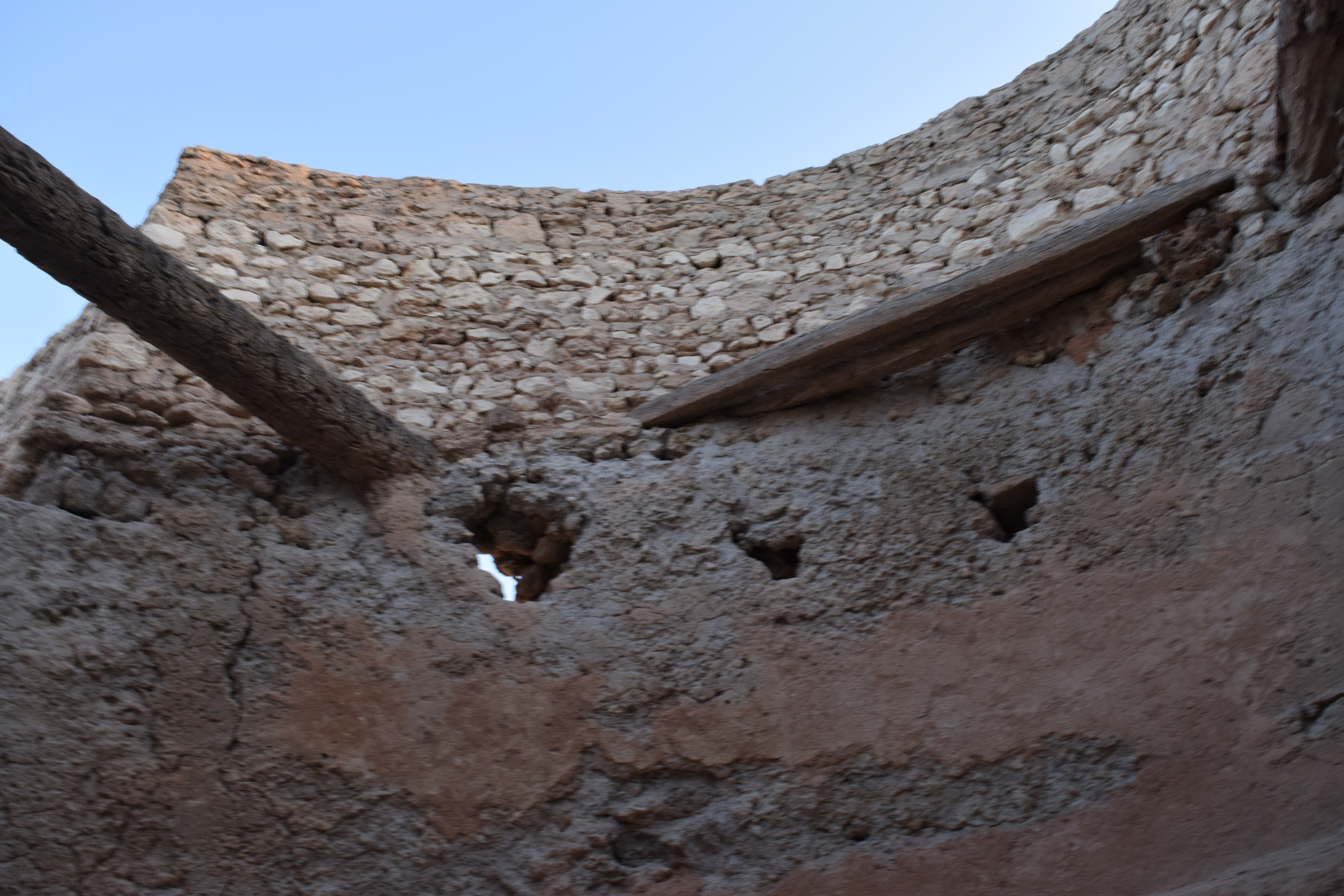
View from inside the northwest tower.

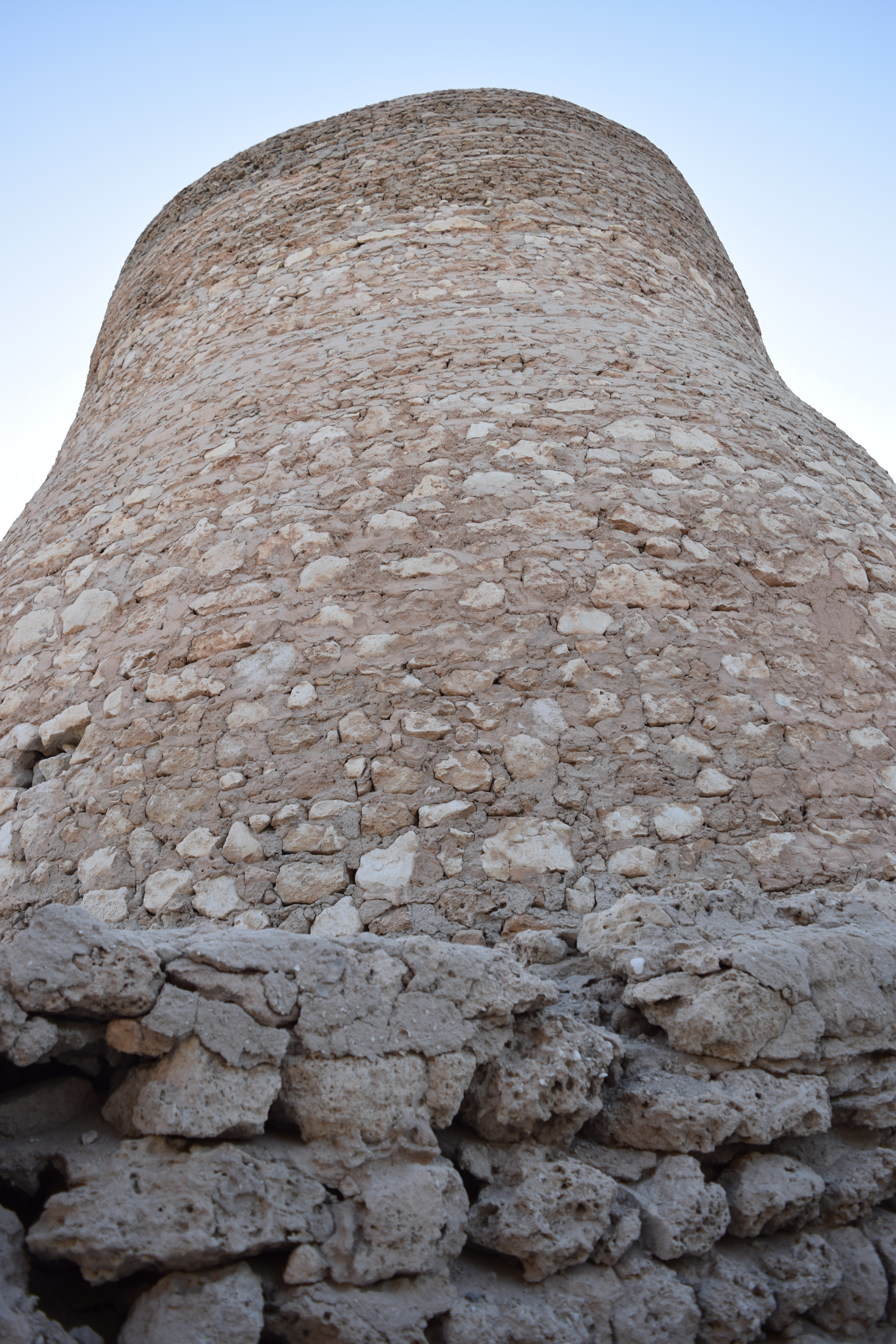
The south tower of the castle.

It is noteworthy that the northwestern and southwestern towers are the only two towers consistently visible in all historical photographs of Tarut Castle. In contrast, the two eastern towers do not appear in all older images. The southeastern tower was bombed by forces of the First Saudi State around 1791 AD and remained partially standing until 1916 AD, when it collapsed onto a nearby residence. It was later restored in 1984 AD by the Ministry of Archeology.

The northeastern tower, which overlooked the old Tarut market, was completely destroyed during the same period. Evidence suggests that the castle's entrance was located near this tower, as old photographs depict the remains of a stone staircase with three lintels in front of the ruins of the northeastern tower. However, the true shape of the fourth tower remains uncertain due to its destruction over two centuries ago.

=== Fences ===
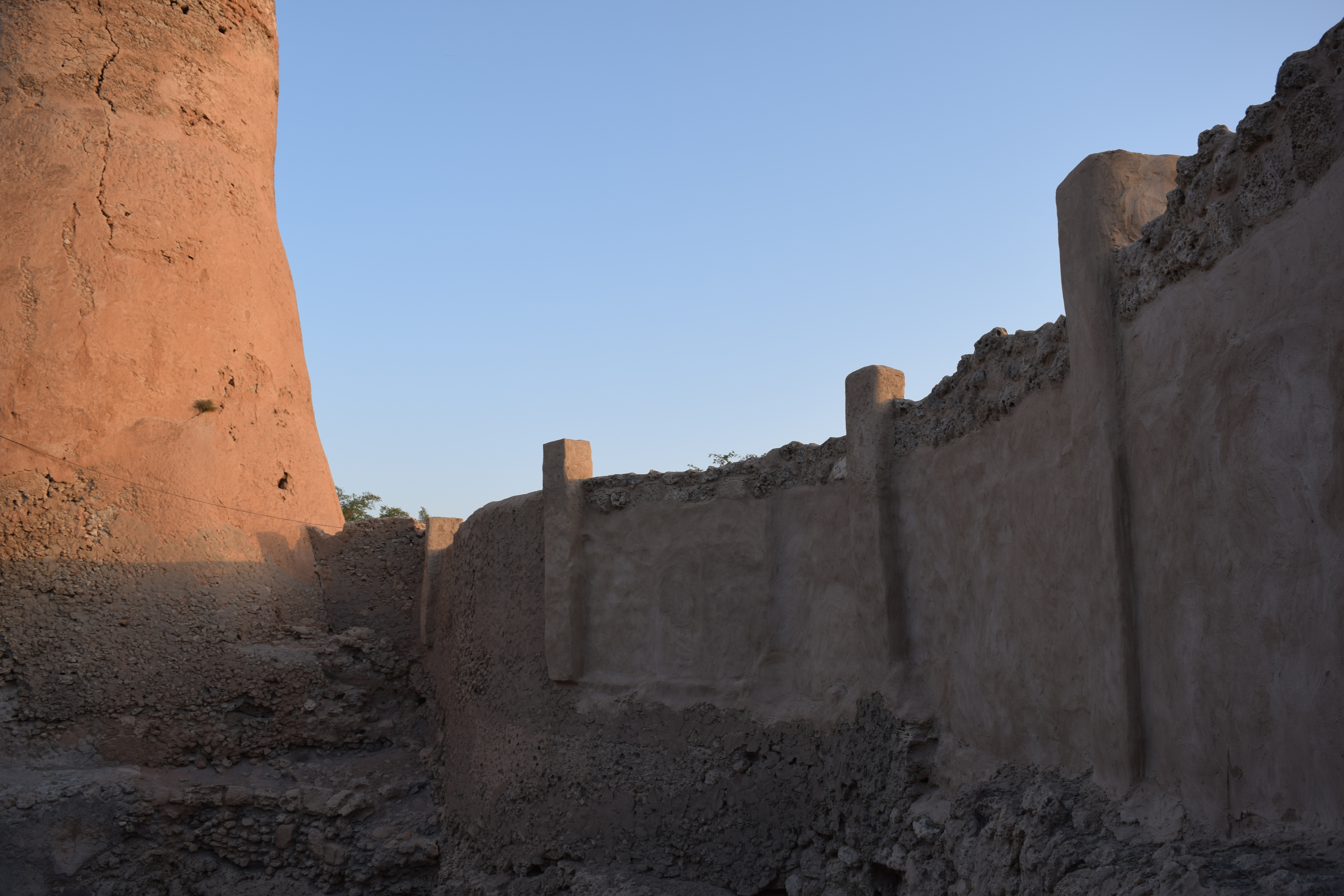
One of the ramparts surrounding the castle's eye and the northeastern part of the castle.

A review of historical photographs of Tarut Castle has revealed the existence of an external wall surrounding the castle, situated within the boundaries of the walled village of Tarut. This wall formed an arched strip extending from the southwest corner of the village. The wall continues from the northwest corner, integrating with the southern dwellings and becoming part of the village's structures. It is also connected to the Tarut bathhouse facilities and sections of the old Tarut market in the northwest.

The wall intersects with another structure running west to east, which contains a central door, believed to be the main entrance to Tarut Castle and its village. The height of the surrounding wall ranges between four and six meters. During the Ottoman era, an additional meter was added to the height, and the wall was later widened by 0.5 meters, making the total width approximately one meter. The wall's last known restoration occurred during the Ottoman era, between 1871 AD and 1912 AD.

The village of Tarut had two primary gates, known as Darawiza. The first gate, Darawiza Al-Ain (or Al-Hammam), was located near the Tarut market. The second, Darawiza Al-Sharqiya, was situated between Beit Umaybad and Beit Askariya. Integrated into the residential structures, the wall and towers formed part of the two-story houses, extending to cover the first floor. Additionally, a third, smaller gate known as Khadaa allowed farmers access to their fields and provided a route back to the fortress.

=== Trench ===
The main entrance to the village and the citadel, located in the center of the northern wall, is known as Darwaza al-Hammam. In front of this entrance lies a large square situated outside the village wall. The square is enclosed on all sides, with the village wall to the south, shops to the east, and a water stream, locally known as al-Seeb, running from Ain al-Awda towards the village of Sanabis to the north and west.

This water stream, formerly serving as a natural moat, acted as a defensive barrier impeding the movement of soldiers in the event of an invasion. Any approaching enemy forces entering the square would be fully exposed to rifle fire from the northern wall and the high towers, enhancing the defensive capabilities of the village and citadel.

In the Qatif region, various defensive strategies were employed, including the construction of sewers and trenches. Local residents built temporary bridges made from palm trunks to facilitate movement during peaceful times. However, during periods of conflict, these bridges were dismantled to hinder the movement of enemy forces, providing an additional layer of defense for the area.

=== Basements ===
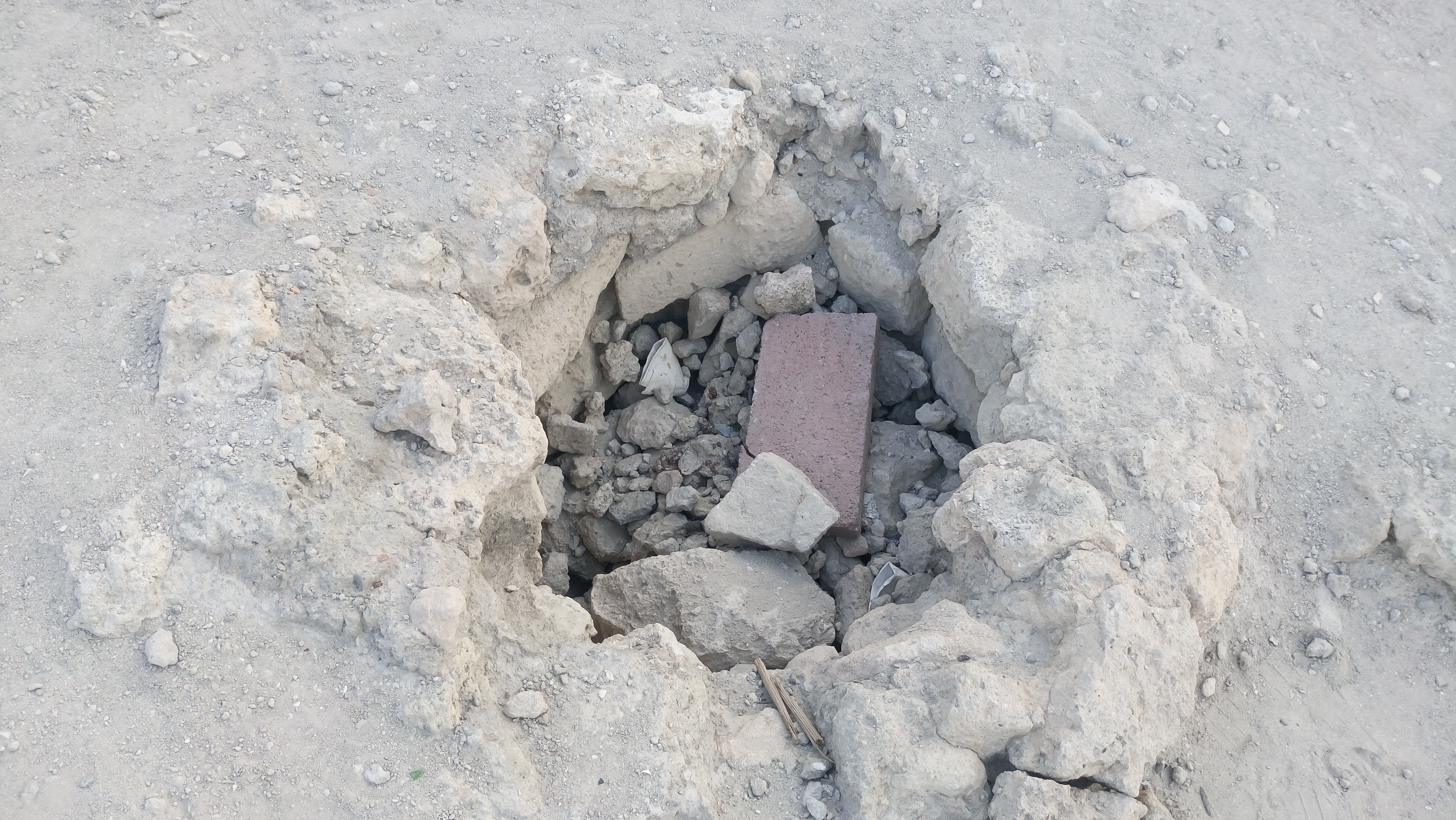
A well located in the center of the interior of Tarut Castle, which is believed to have stored supplies for the soldiers or was a branch of Ain Al-Awda, the well was buried as a result of neglect and the accumulation of sand.

In 1984 AD, during restoration work at Tarut Castle, the archaeological team discovered a well situated in the center of the castle courtyard. Upon investigation, it was determined that the well was deep and functioned as a water storage system, referred to as a pocket, used during sieges. Some believe that this pocket may lead to a basement beneath the castle, which was reportedly used for storing weapons and supplies. The pocket was spacious, designed to hold significant provisions.

During the Portuguese period, and later under the Ottomans, the basement also served as a prison for those who disobeyed military orders. It was connected to a secret passage leading outside the castle to the Rumaili area. This passage provided a means of escape during a siege, allowing the castle's occupants to evacuate unnoticed.

The well's design at Tarut Castle shares similarities with those found in other Portuguese castles in Oman. According to the Portuguese geographer Pedro Barreto, many Portuguese castles in Oman featured circular towers at each corner, along with water wells and underground ammunition storage facilities. There are also notable architectural similarities between Tarut Castle and Dibba Portuguese Castle, as described in Barreto's reports, particularly in the design of the cellar and other structural elements.

=== Mast ===
An old photograph indicates that the flagpole, which displayed the Ottoman flag, was positioned directly in front of the northwestern tower of Tarut Castle. This flagpole was located in the square of the walled village, situated behind the northern wall and centered around the pigeons' stairs, or the main entrance to the village.

A comparison between the flagpole locations at Darien Castle and the port building in Ras Tanura reveals that flagpoles are typically found near main entrances. This suggests that the entrance to Tarut Castle was likely in close proximity to the flagpole, reinforcing the strategic placement of both the entrance and the flagpole in the castle's layout.

== Castle scheme ==
Tarut Castle has experienced numerous changes in political and military status throughout its history. Its resilience is a defining characteristic that has contributed to its survival into the present day, reflecting the structure's ability to withstand various challenges over the centuries.

The location of Tarut Castle in the center of Tarut Island, amidst a dense forest of palm trees and perched on a rocky outcrop. Additionally, the walls of the castle are reinforced with iron rods, enhancing its durability and resilience against various threats.

=== History of construction ===
A considerable number of researchers agree that the construction of Tarut Castle dates back to the Uyunid Emirate era (1076-1238 AD). It was later restored by the Portuguese Empire on 29 March 1544 AD (corresponding to 1 Jumada I, 951 AH) during the Portuguese invasion of Qatif. However, some researchers suggest that the castle was constructed at the beginning of the sixteenth century AD, specifically between 1515 AD and 1521 AD. This timeframe aligns with historical evidence indicating that the Portuguese ruled the Persian Gulf region until 1650 AD, amounting to approximately 150 years of dominance.

The construction of Tarut Castle was undertaken with the objective of controlling the commercial outlets in the area. It was regarded as one of the castles built by the Portuguese to exert influence over the Persian Gulf and to reinforce the fortress of Hormuz at the entrance to the Persian Gulf. The Portuguese aimed to control the Strait of Hormuz to impede trade between Arab countries and other nations, particularly India. Additionally, several other castles were constructed in Oman, including Khor Fakkan and Jalfar.

In 1551 and 1552, Ottoman forces launched an offensive against the Qatif fortress, successfully expelling the Portuguese. The Ottoman forces also attacked and destroyed the fortress of Muscat and subsequently besieged Bahrain for several months, but they were ultimately unable to gain control and withdrew. In 1602, Shah Abbas successfully expelled the Portuguese from Bahrain. With the signing of the treaty between Iran and the English in 1635 AD, along with the death of the Portuguese commander Roy Free Regongrada, the Portuguese presence in the Persian Gulf region effectively came to an end.

== Ain Tarout ==
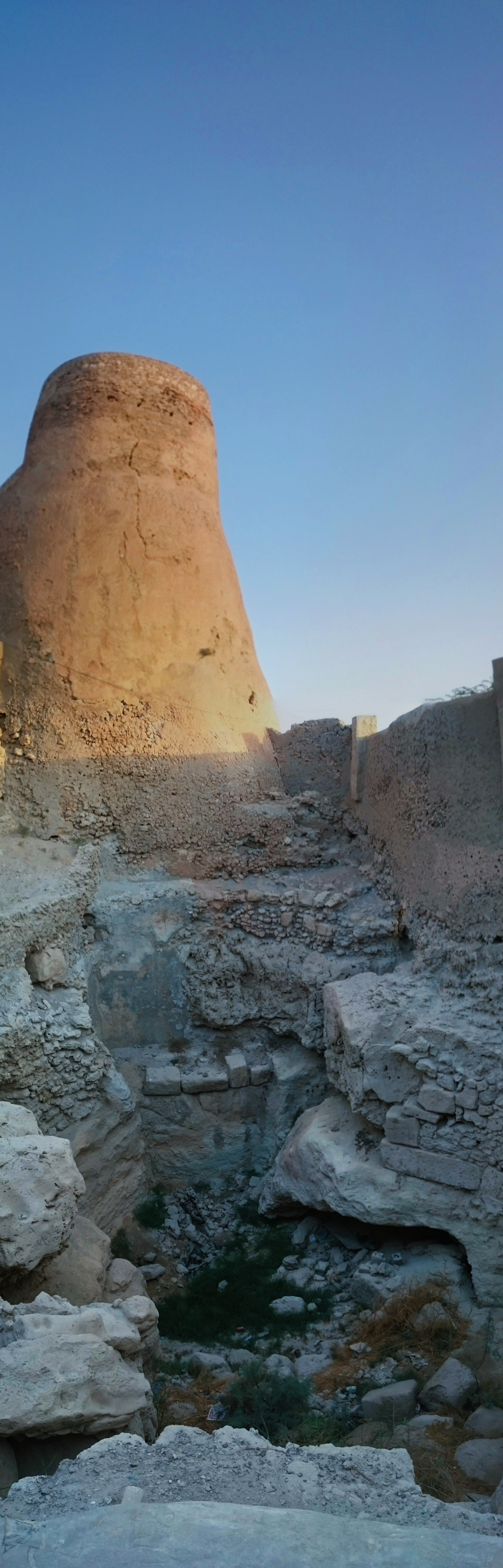
Tarut's northeastern castle tower and Ain al-Awda dry eye

Ain Al-Awda, also referred to as Ain Al-Hammam, Ain Al-Halqoum, Ain Tarut, or Ain Al-Qalaa, is a sulphurous spring that has been in existence for approximately 4,000 years. It irrigates the entire Tarut Island and is known for its mineral-rich water, attracting visitors seeking its therapeutic properties. The spring emits hot water and steam during the winter months, while it produces lukewarm water in the summer. Traditionally, Ain Al-Awda has been considered sacred by the inhabitants of the various civilizations that once thrived in the region, with many religions attributing a degree of holiness to water, reflected in the customs associated with the spring.

Despite attempts to revive it, Ain Al-Awda has currently dried up, and no water flows from it. Historically, both men and women visited the site at designated times, with remnants of these visits still visible today. The spring is carved into the rock and overlooks Tarut Castle, situated near the castle's base.

In the past, Ain Al-Awda was primarily used by women for washing clothes, although men began to utilize it intermittently over time. Some women have recounted experiences from when the spring was reserved exclusively for female visitors; they discovered a rock submerged in the water that bore a drawing of a statue with prominent breasts. This sight led them to abandon the rock and return home in a state of apprehension. The area surrounding the spring was inhabited by frogs and small fish, known locally as huarsin, and larger fish were occasionally sighted. Ain Al-Awda was a popular destination for divers and sailors from the eastern coastline and the Gulf States, particularly from Kuwait and Bahrain.

The Ain Tarut bath is supplied by a branch that extends from the main stream, originating from the eye of Ain Al-Awda. This branch previously led to a pond on the western side, which functioned as a women's restroom and was bordered by a hill. In his book Dilmun, Jeffrey Beebe, the head of the Danish mission that conducted excavations in the 1960s, references Tarut as part of the historical context of the Dilmun Barbar civilization, which was concentrated on the hill adjacent to Ain al-Awda. This site is considered one of the foundational elements of Tarut Island's civilization.

Until 1937, the town of Darien received water from a small tributary originating in the center of Tarut Island. This tributary flowed south from the spring located beneath the castle to the northeastern tip of Darien, near the present-day Al-Jazeera Club. Locally known as Al-Qantara, this waterway ultimately discharges into the sea, located over 1,500 meters away. Residents of Darien would typically walk approximately 1,000 meters to either the end of the Ain Al-Awda stream or to Al-Qantara to collect water.

The Ain Al-Awda is composed of four distinct layers. The first layer, known as the outer cavity layer, defines the geometric shape of the spring. The second layer consists of rocky outcrops that extend into the inner walls of the eye. The third layer features a lengthy basement and a waterway that channels the spring's water to surrounding farms; this section is the narrowest of the four layers. Beneath this is the sedimentary layer, which permits groundwater to flow through and replenish the spring. However, this source of water was soon depleted, resulting in a force that caused swimmers to be pushed upward.

== History of the castle ==
The earliest documented reference to Tarut Castle appears in both Portuguese and Ottoman records. These historical documents indicate that a Portuguese military contingent was stationed on Tarut Island, where they began restoration efforts on the castle on 29 March 1544. It is evident that the castle served a short-term function for the Portuguese forces before being utilized by Ottoman troops. It is believed that the castle was among those belonging to the Ayuni state, as it is not mentioned in earlier historical sources. Construction of the castle is dated to 468 AH / 1076 AD and was built upon the remnants of ancient structures dating back to 5000 BC. Visible adjacent to a deep water spring, which connects to a channel leading to an exposed stone pool, are the foundations of a structure from the Bronze Age. This structure is thought to have been a temple dedicated to Ishtarot, or Ishtar, the goddess worshiped by the ancient peoples of the Arabian Gulf.

=== Pre-Castle Era (5000 BC) ===
Tarut Castle is located atop a prominent hill where numerous ancient artifacts have been discovered, including a statue of the Sumerian Queen Ishtar. This hill is believed to be the site of the temple dedicated to Queen Ishtar, which she is said to have constructed after being expelled from Mesopotamia by King Gilgamesh. Additionally, it is thought that the castle was built on the ruins of the Temple of Astarte, which was dedicated to the Phoenician gods. This temple was situated adjacent to a water spring known as Ain al-Awda in the sixteenth century AD, resting on the remnants of an earlier temple that dates back approximately five thousand years BC.

=== Portuguese Era (1518–1650) ===
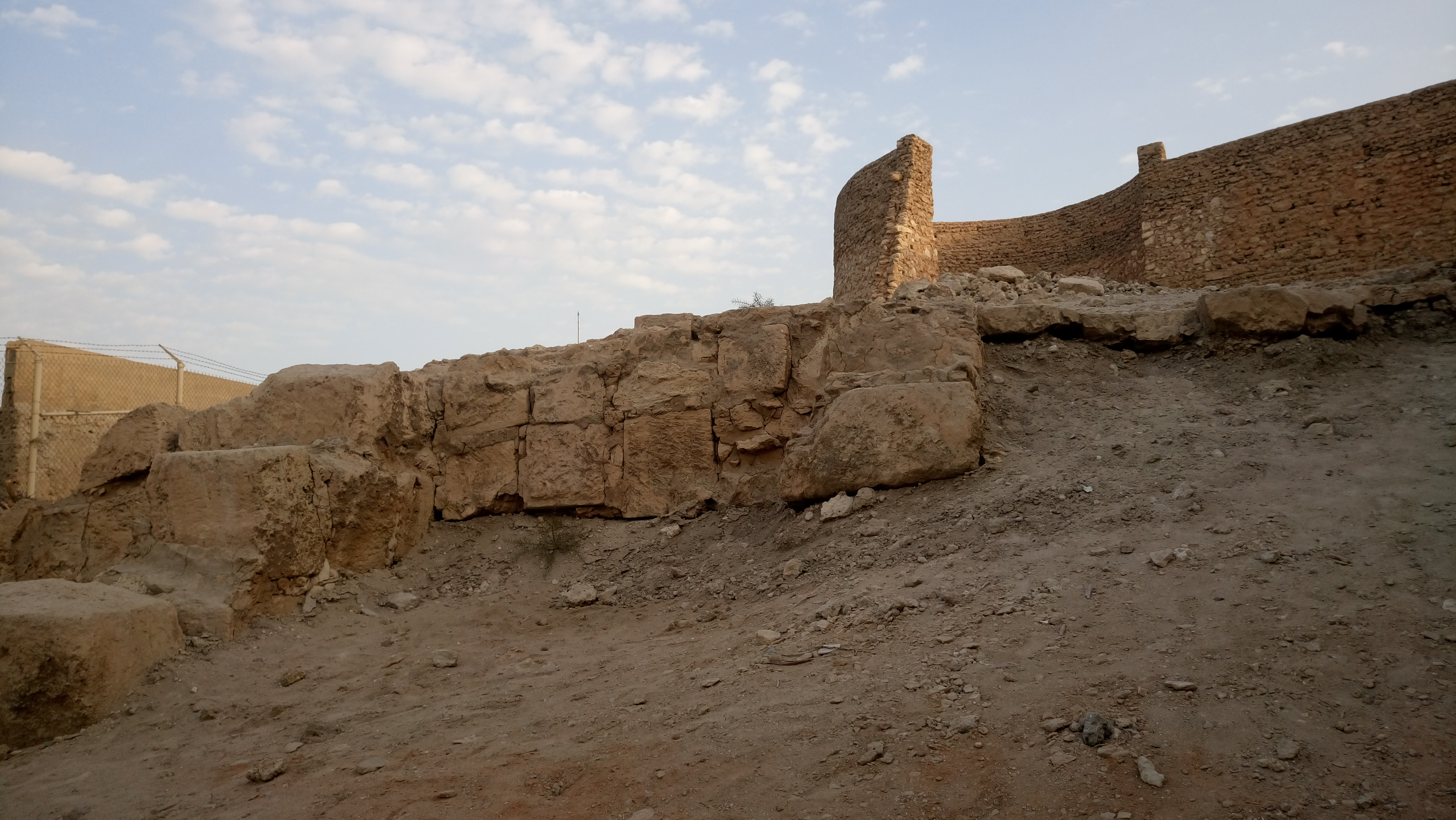
The rocks of the main temple on which the castle was built.

It is believed that the Portuguese constructed and fortified Tarut Castle between 1515 and 1521 AD, utilizing it during the six years they held control over the region. A signal fire was used as a warning system, with smoke visible during the day and light at night to indicate impending danger, as well as to monitor ships passing near the island. The Portuguese occupied the castle for a brief period before eventually abandoning all their castles, fortresses, and military installations in the area, permanently withdrawing from the region.

== The Ottoman Era (1871–1912 AD) ==
=== Banu Khalid taking shelter in Tarut Castle ===
In 1791 AD, Imam Saud bin Abdul Aziz launched a military campaign against Qatif, successfully capturing the region and its surrounding areas. During the invasion, Abdullah bin Suleiman al-Mahshuri, commander of the Khalidi forces, retreated to Tarut Castle following his defeat in the Battle of al-Jarudiyah. He established a defensive position within the castle, preparing for a confrontation with Ibn Saud's forces.

After securing Qatif, Ibrahim bin Afisan, one of Ibn Saud's commanders, sent his brother Fahd bin Afisan with 2,000 troops to Tarut Island to engage the Banu Khalid. Fahd initially gained control of the island and requested reinforcements. Ibrahim dispatched an additional 1,000 men, bringing the total force to 3,000. The combined forces then attacked Tarut Castle, successfully capturing it after a fierce battle. However, the engagement resulted in heavy casualties, leading to a strategic withdrawal of approximately 2.5 kilometers from the castle.

After retreating from Tarut Castle, Fahd bin Afisan resumed his siege of the fortress. One night, Abdullah bin Suleiman al-Mahshuri, the Khalidi commander barricaded inside the castle, consulted with his men about launching a counterattack. They agreed and ventured out to confront the Saudi forces, but the attempt failed, leading to Fahd bin Afisan's death during the battle. Fahd had requested additional reinforcements from his brother Ibrahim, but before they could arrive, the Banu Khalid returned to the castle and fortified their position.

However, realizing that they were unable to withstand the Saudis, the Khalidi forces remained trapped inside. Ibrahim bin Afisan, in response, besieged the castle for twenty days. He then ordered the use of cannons to bombard the castle, with the attack believed to have originated from the northern side near Darwazat al-Hammam, the main entrance to Tarut Castle and the walled village. The relentless artillery fire caused severe damage, demolishing the eastern half of the castle and parts of the northern wall. This breach allowed Ibrahim bin Afisan's forces to penetrate the castle and seize control.

During the final assault, the Saudis managed to infiltrate the caves beneath the castle, ultimately defeating Abdullah al-Mahshuri and the Banu Khalid forces. With this victory, the Saudis gained full control over the Qatif region.

=== Al Khalifa's seizure of Tarut Castle ===
Following the Saudis' consolidation of power over Al-Ahsa and Qatif, they launched campaigns to extend their influence to Qatar and Bahrain, which had been under the rule of the Al-Khalifa Al-Atoub. These territories were subsequently brought under Saudi control, establishing a dependency relationship with the Al-Khalifa. During this period, Rahmah ibn Jabir al-Jalhami was appointed Emir of Dammam, despite the long-standing rivalry between the Al-Khalifa and Rahma bin Jaber. This conflict culminated in Rahma bin Jaber's death near Ras Tanura around 1830.

After the death of Imam Turki bin Abdullah Al Saud, the founder of the Second Saudi State, in 1834, his son Faisal withdrew from the Qatif region and returned to Dariyah. Taking advantage of the political instability, the ruler of Bahrain, Sheikh Abdullah bin Ahmed Al Khalifa, seized control of the forts of Darien and Tarut, which were said to generate an annual income of $300,300.

=== Sheikh Musharraf takes shelter in Tarut Castle ===
Following the annexation of Dammam, Tarut and Darien by Sheikh Abdullah bin Ahmad Al Khalifa, the expansion of his influence was considered. This was to be achieved by occupying Al-Ahsa, capitalising on the unrest in Diriyah following the assassination of Imam Turki bin Abdullah Al Saud. To this end, contact was made with a sheikh and leader of the Amir tribe, Mushrif, who was urged to attack Qatif and Al-Ahsa. Ahsa. However, Saudi Prince Omar bin Afisan, the governor of Al-Ahsa, took the initiative to intervene. The Saudi army arrived in Tarut under the command of Abdullah bin Mashari and attempted to storm the Tarut fortress. However, the attempt was unsuccessful. In response, the Emir of Bahrain implemented a naval blockade on Qatif and Uqair with the objective of weakening the Najd government.

=== Tarut Castle as Ottoman headquarters ===
During the Ottoman era (1871–1912), Tarut was an island within the Qatif district, part of the Najd Brigade attached to Basra. In line with the Ottoman administrative structure, the Qaimaqam acted as the local governor and was the highest-ranking administrative official in the district. The Qaimaqam was appointed by the central government in Al-Isti'an and held the authority to appoint district directors, who in turn designated mukhtars (village mayors) for the villages affiliated with the district.

The mukhtar was usually selected from a prominent and influential family within the village. His role and influence extended beyond the formal boundaries of the Ottoman administrative system, often enjoying significant authority and prestige. The mukhtar served as a crucial intermediary between the local population and the Ottoman authorities. His primary responsibilities included:

1. Provide proof of real estate ownership and transfer.
2. Accompanying police officers when they raid the homes of wanted persons.
3. Communicate state orders, laws, and regulations to the villagers.
4. Notifying individuals who are required to report to official departments.
5. Validate the guarantees requested by the government.
6. Government tax collection.
7. Informing the district director of incidents that occur in his area.

== Neighborhoods ==
=== Tarut Castle Cafe ===
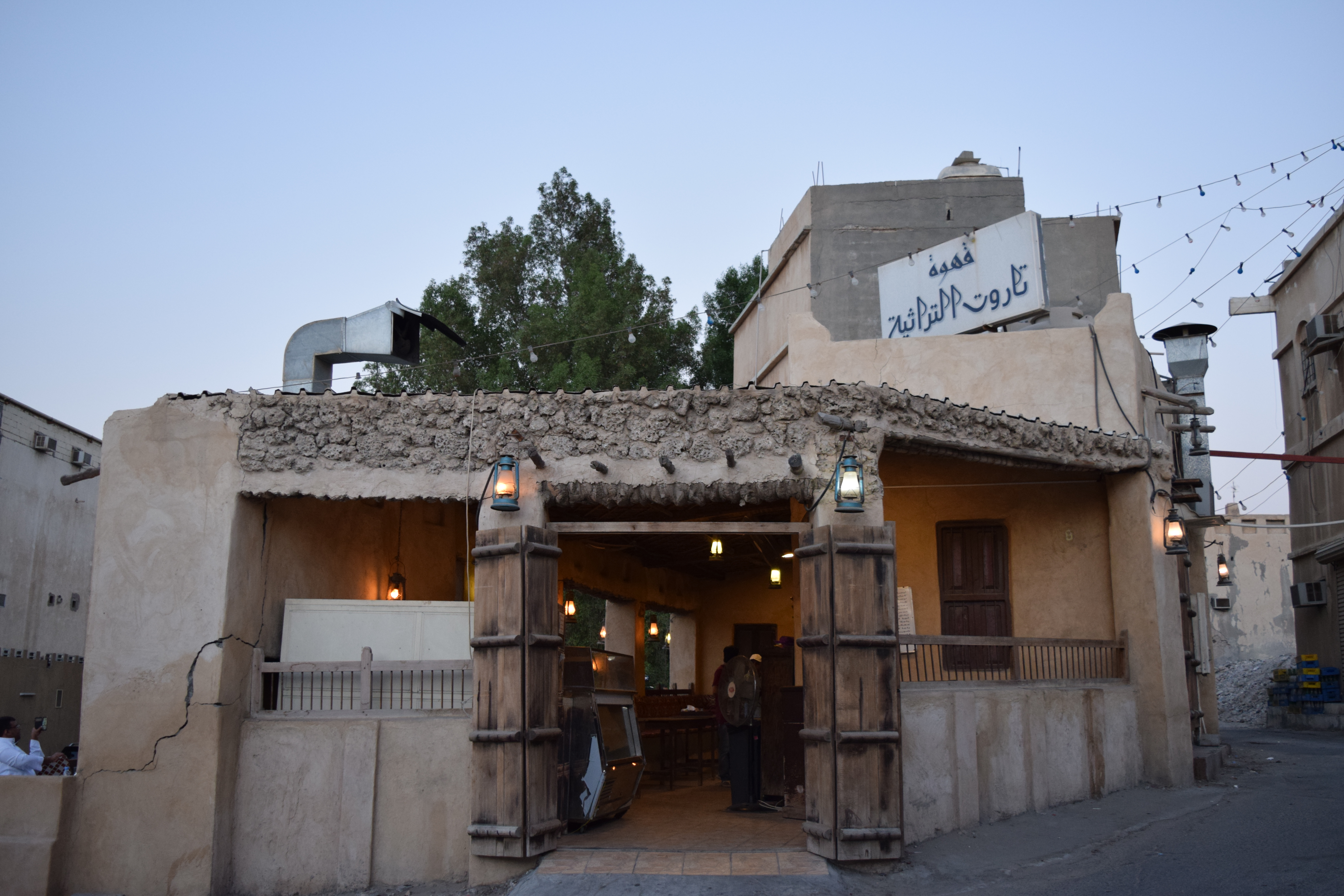
The popular Tarut Café, located right next to the castle.

In 2004 AD, a café was established near Tarut Castle, designed in a traditional style reflecting popular local architecture. The café is located at the western end of the town of Deira on Tarut Island, close to the historic site of Tarut Castle. The establishment covers an area of approximately 4 square meters, blending into the cultural and historical landscape of the region.

The café was conceived by Hassan Ali Al-Saffar and his associate Abdulaziz Al-Khabbaz, aiming to foster dialogue between the elderly and the younger generation. The initiative was designed to allow younger individuals to gain insight into the region's history by documenting and sharing the experiences and memories of the older community members.

=== Imam Al-Kazim Mosque ===
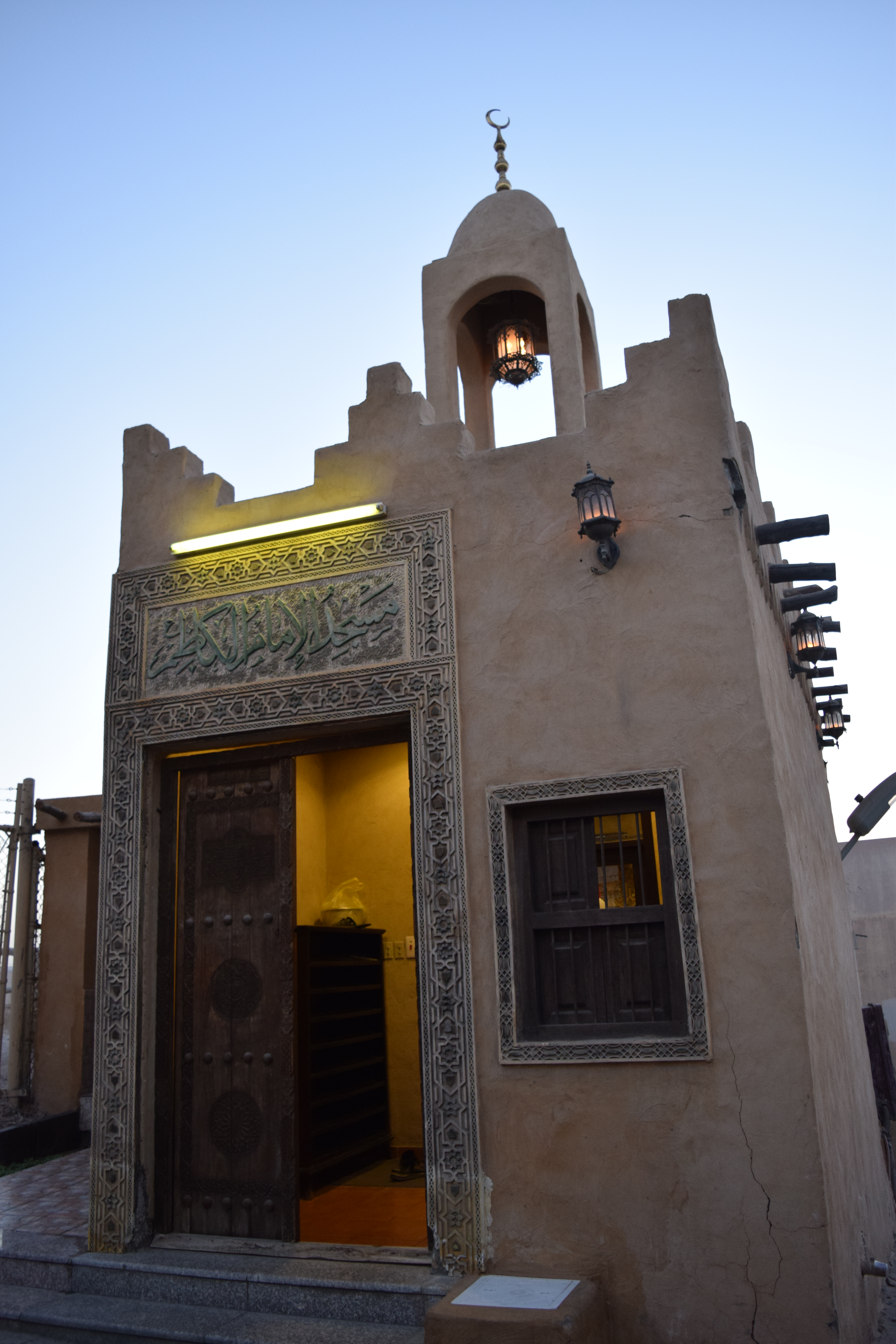
A front view of the Kadhim Mosque, which is located next to the citadel.

Al-Kazim Mosque, also known as Al-Qalaa Mosque or Al-Ain Mosque, is a small mosque comprising a single room and a toilet. It is situated adjacent to the castle and is constructed in a traditional folk architectural style.

=== Artisans market ===
On 22 July 2011, a contractor was appointed to oversee the restoration and adaptation of the craftsmen's market adjacent to the historic Tarut Castle. This project involves renovating the old shops, designing and manufacturing wooden doors that replicate traditional designs adorned with copper and traditional inscriptions. The total area of the project is approximately 112 square meters and includes the construction of two balustrades featuring traditional Tarut designs, along with roofs made of jandal, basjil, and mats.

Additionally, the project aims to create permanent centers for artisans to practice their crafts, consolidating their work in a single location rather than scattering it across various sites. This initiative is intended to encourage artisans to continue their trades and provide opportunities to market their products to visitors and tourists. The project also includes the restoration and preservation of the buildings adjacent to Tarut Castle, with the goal of transforming the area into an attractive center for artisans, tourists, and visitors to the region.

=== Ain Tarut's bath ===
Ain Tarut's bath, also known as Hammam Tarut, Hammam al-Masjid, or Hammam al-Souq, is a sulfur bath that branches off from Ain al-Awda. It was constructed during the Portuguese era and was utilized by the Ottoman pashas to gain access to the commercial market. However, in 1991, the hammam was filled in and converted into a modern swimming pool.

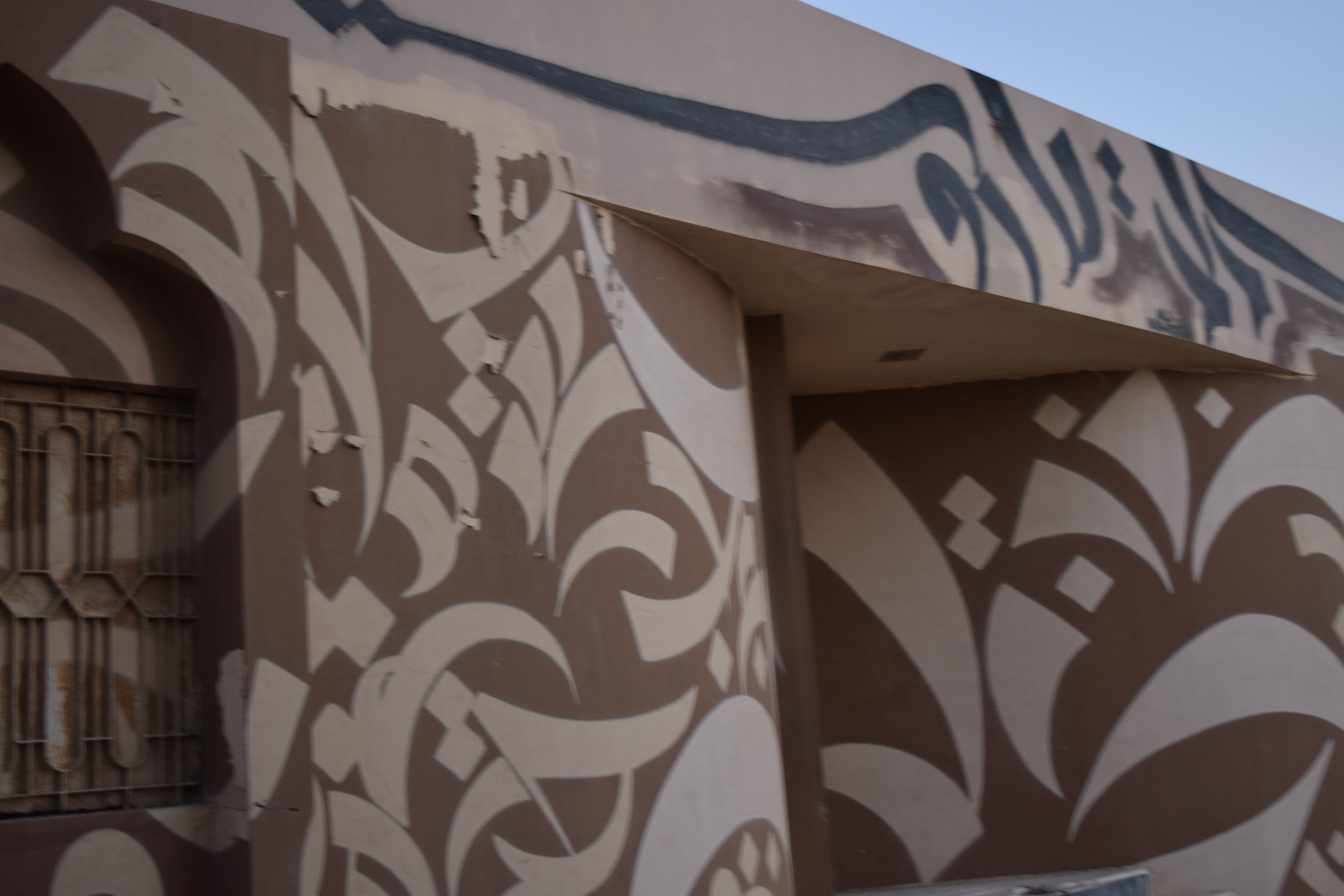
An exterior view of the hammam of Ain Tarut, which is still closed.

The bath was home to small fish believed to aid in healing scars and ulcers, earning them the nickname "underwater doctors" among some contemporary residents of the island. Hammam Ain Tarut draws its water directly from Ain al-Awda, as it is located adjacent to Tarut Castle. The bath's history dates back to around 1076 AD during the reign of the Uyunis, when the southern part of the castle was designated for local bathing.

A tunnel connects the bath to the original spring of Ain al-Awda and Hammam Pasha, which is part of Ain al-Awda. Water from the spring flows in a southern and eastern direction, with the Tarut bath branching off from the Pasha bath. Unfortunately, the municipality's decision to fill and remove the Tarut bath in 1991 disregarded its historical significance, leading to its disappearance from the landscape.

==== Benefits and beliefs ====
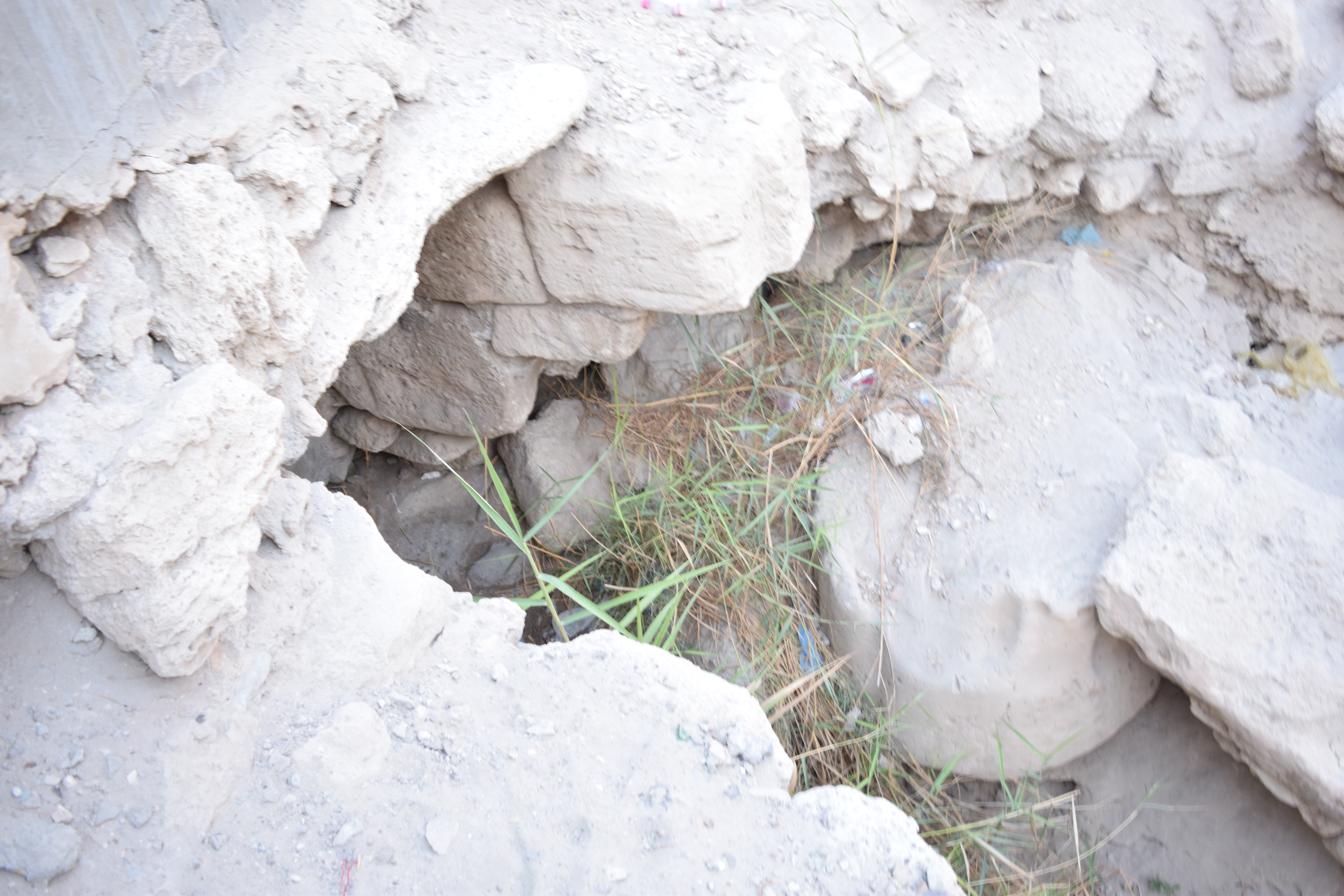
The water branch from Ain al-Qalaa to Hammam al-Basha, which leads to Hammam Ain Tarut.

In the past, bathing in Hammam Tarut, renowned for its sulfurous water, was a source of pride and boasting among sailors who visited Tarut Island. After enduring the harsh conditions of the sea, which often left their bodies festering or cracked due to salinity and a lack of fresh water on diving boats, the hammam provided a much-needed respite. It served as a place of rest and recreation for these sailors, who would gather with divers from the Gulf region.

Visitors included not only sailors but also residents from Qatif, Darien, Al-Zour, and Sanabis, all drawn to the therapeutic properties of the bath. A notable feature of Hammam Tarut was the presence of a species of fish known as Afati or Tabasha, often referred to as "underwater doctors". These fish were believed to cleanse the body of fungi, a belief widely held among the sailors who frequented the hammam.

==== Construction ====
The bathhouse was built with huge stones and large carved boulders, three metres wide and about 25 metres long, in which the ancestors of the region put great effort, and Pasha's bathhouse was 75 metres long.

== Improvements and restoration ==
=== Ottoman restoration of Tarut Castle 1872 ===
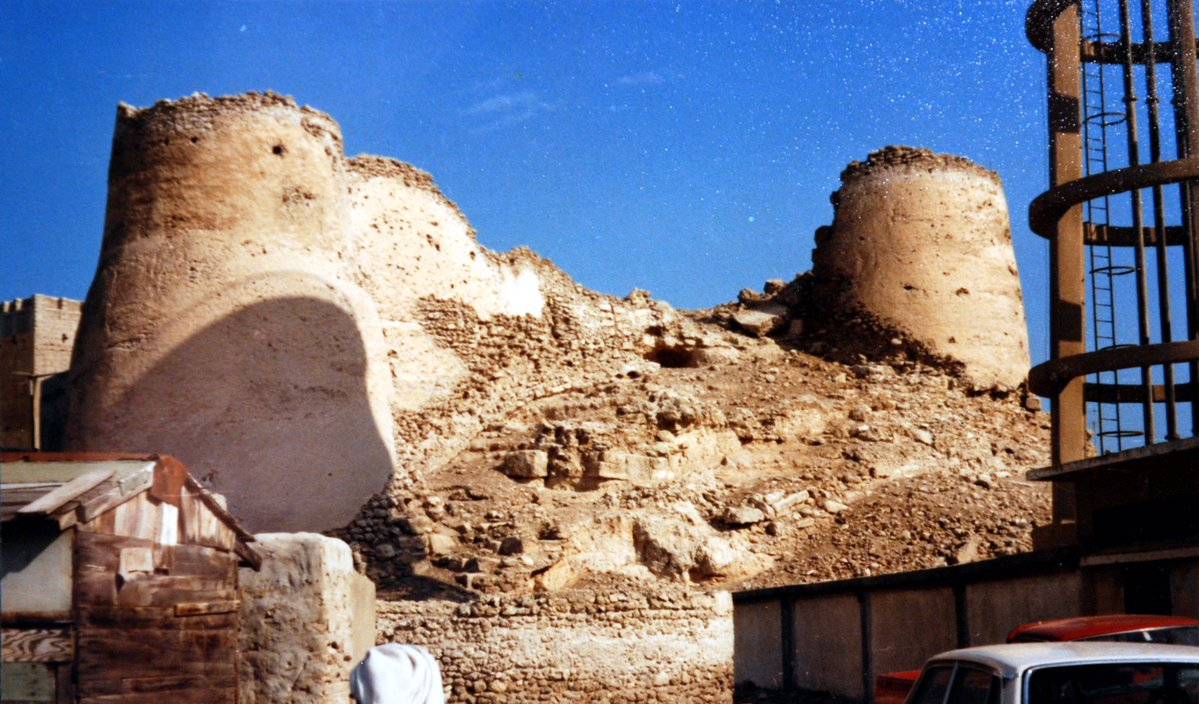
A photo of the castle's facade as it appeared in 1978.

As for the Ottomans, they mention that Tarut Castle was repaired in 1872 by order of the viceroy Ahmed Medhat Pasha, and Ain al-Hammam was excavated at the same time that the Ottomans established the Ras Tanura customs house, but the castle did not last long and its north-western tower collapsed during this period (1872–1888), and Ain al-Hammam was filled in. So we find the Ottoman commander Nafez Pasha mentioning it in a report he wrote after his inspection visit to Qatif in 1888.

=== Restoration of Tarut Castle 1984 ===
Tarut Castle remained standing until 1917 AD, when the south-east tower collapsed as a result of rain, and this tower and some parts of the castle were restored in 1984 AD by the Ministry of Tourism in the modern Saudi era, but the work was suddenly stopped in that year without being completed for reasons that are still unknown, and this was the last restoration of this castle.

== Castle Development Plans ==
- In March 2007, efforts commenced to develop Tarut Castle and its surrounding area, which included plans for restaurants, orchards, and water ponds. On March 12, 2007, the Municipal Council of Qatif Governorate submitted a comprehensive study to the Higher Tourism Authority (now known as the General Authority for Tourism and National Heritage). This proposal focused on the development of the perimeter of Tarut Castle, covering an estimated total area of 16,333 square meters. The project was discussed in a meeting between the Municipal Council and the Higher Tourism Authority held at the council's secretariat headquarters in Qatif Municipality. During the meeting, the authority expressed its readiness to review the project, ensuring that it met the necessary conditions and regulations for tourism initiatives.
- In March 2007, plans were announced for the establishment and reconstruction of the Tarut Castle Museum. On March 29, 2007, the Supreme Commission for Tourism, in collaboration with the Municipal Council of Qatif Governorate, launched a project aimed at restoring the antiquities of the Deira neighborhood on Tarut Island. This initiative focused on collecting archaeological artifacts from individuals, associations, and government agencies to document the region's history through photographic, cartographic, planning, and field survey materials. The Municipal Council proposed the creation of a museum and panorama covering an area of 2,900 square meters near the castle. Additionally, the project included the reconstruction of the ancient Tarut Castle and its renowned bathhouse, Hammam Ain Tarut, encompassing a perimeter of 2,500 square meters.
- The development of Tarut Castle commenced in December 2009. On December 27, 2009, I inquired with Dr. Ali Al-Ghabban, the Vice President of the General Authority for Tourism and Antiquities, regarding the establishment of an archaeological museum in proximity to the castle. During this discussion, he also outlined plans for the Eastern Province Museum, which is set to be constructed on a 10,000 square meter site along the waterfront in Dammam. The museum will feature an exhibition area of 8,000 square meters, with Tarut Island anticipated to showcase the largest collection of archaeological displays.
- In February 2010, restoration and development efforts for Tarut Castle officially commenced. On February 23, 2010, Engineer Abdul Latif Al-Benyan, the executive director of the Tourism Development and Antiquities Authority in the Eastern Province, confirmed that work had begun on the project to enhance Tarut Castle and its surrounding sites.
- In September 2011, the flow of water from Ain al-Awda was successfully restored. On September 30, 2011, a team of 12 individuals managed to reinstate the water flow for the first time since 1996, when it had been depleted and neglected. The restoration efforts included the removal of dirt and debris, cleaning the structure, reinforcing and repairing the dilapidated walls, and filling the area with stones arranged according to traditional methods.
- In April 2012, the Supreme Commission for Tourism and Antiquities in the Eastern Province announced plans to restore Tarut Castle and protect the region's archaeological sites. On April 5, 2012, the commission revealed its intention to surround all archaeological sites with a ring of iron barriers to preserve and safeguard them. Additionally, it was decided to hire a restoration contractor and, following requests, to engage a specialized archaeological exploration team to conduct re-excavations within the fenced archaeological sites on Tarut Island.
- On September 15, 2013, Engineer Abdul Latif Al-Benyan, the executive director of the General Authority for Tourism and Antiquities in the Eastern Province, announced that restoration efforts for Tarut Castle were set to commence before the end of the year. He highlighted that the restoration and development process would encompass the excavation of underground antiquities in addition to work on Tarut Castle and the Ain Al-Awda archaeological site.
- On February 29, 2016, Engineer Abdul Latif Al-Benyan, the director of the Tourism and National Heritage Authority in the Eastern Province, announced the formation of committees aimed at developing tourist sites in the region. The authority is in the process of preparing the Dareen Visitors Centre and Ain Al-Awda in Tarut as part of these efforts.
- In January 2017, Saeed Al-Khabbaz, the head of the organizing committee for the Investment Opportunities Forum in Qatif Governorate, presented one of the proposed investment projects in the area. This project involved the design of a tourist entertainment resort at Tarut Castle, aimed at enhancing the site's appeal and promoting tourism in the region.
- On 14 October 2017, Deputy Prince Ahmed Al Saud of the Eastern Province launched an initiative aimed at the development of Tarut Castle. This initiative is part of broader efforts to enhance the historical and cultural significance of the site, promoting tourism and preserving its heritage for future generations.
- In February 2018, a team was dispatched to assess the economic returns of several sites in the Eastern Province, including Tarut Castle. This initiative was part of the project titled "Preparing an Economic Revitalization Study of Urban Heritage," aimed at evaluating and enhancing the economic potential of urban heritage sites within the region.

== Existing problems ==
The castle and its surrounding houses have suffered neglect and damage, allegedly due to the lack of attention from the Eastern Province branch of the Department of Tourism and Antiquities. As a result, certain sections of the castle have begun to collapse, and many of the historic houses in the vicinity have deteriorated, with their walls partially collapsed. This situation underscores the urgent need for restoration and rehabilitation efforts to preserve these important cultural and historical sites.

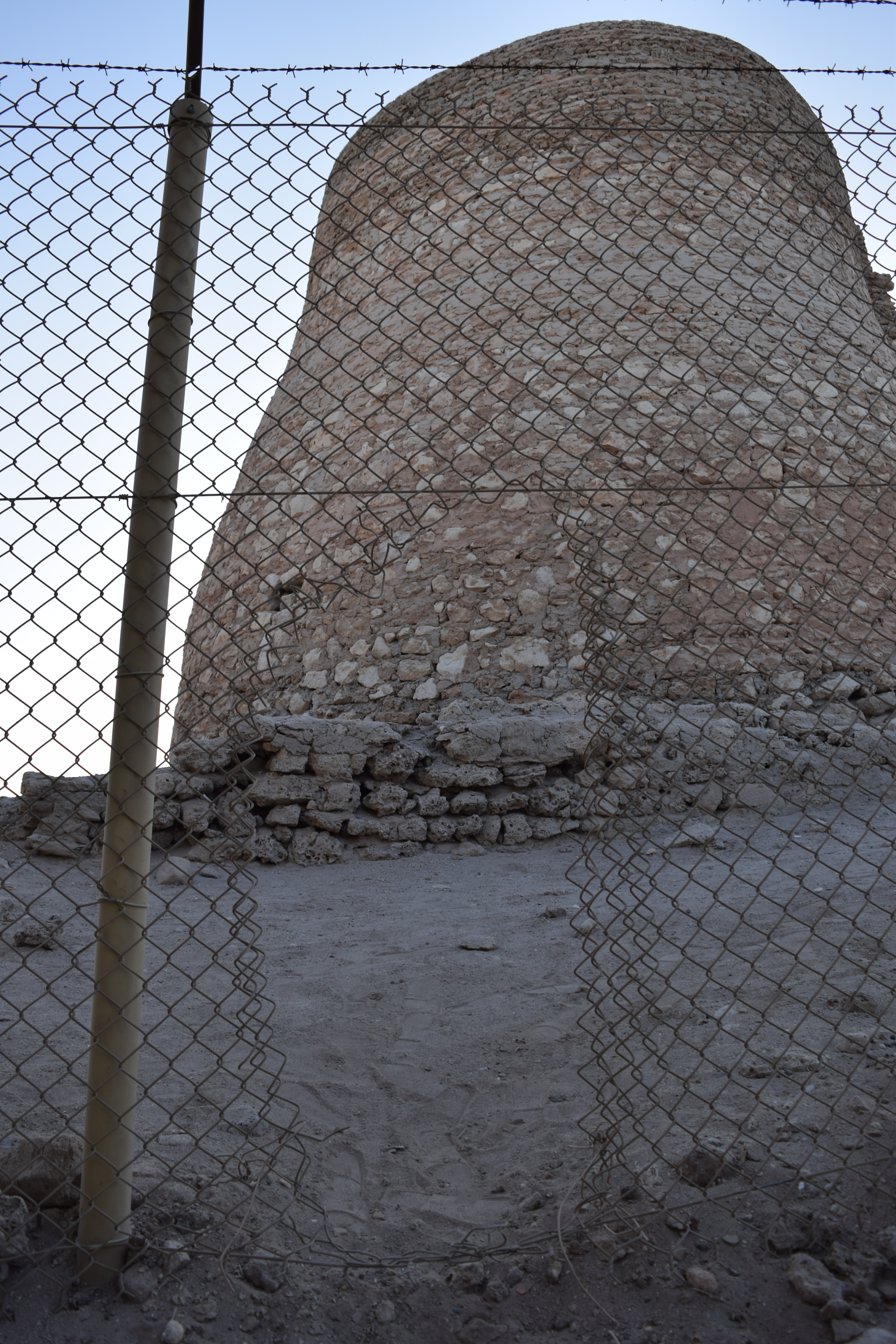
One of the cracks leading to the castle, as there is no official entrance.

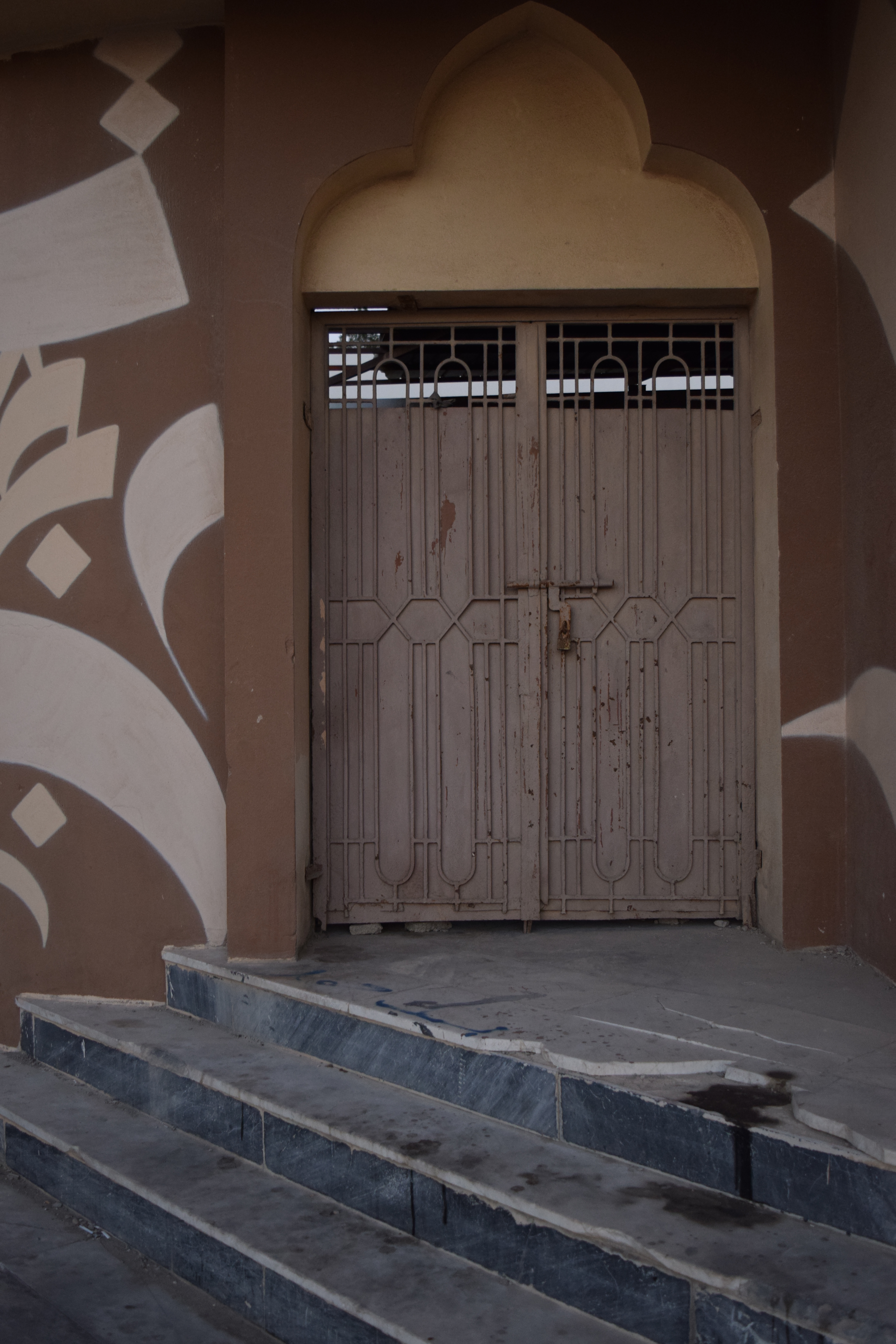
Ain Tarut's bath, which is closed.

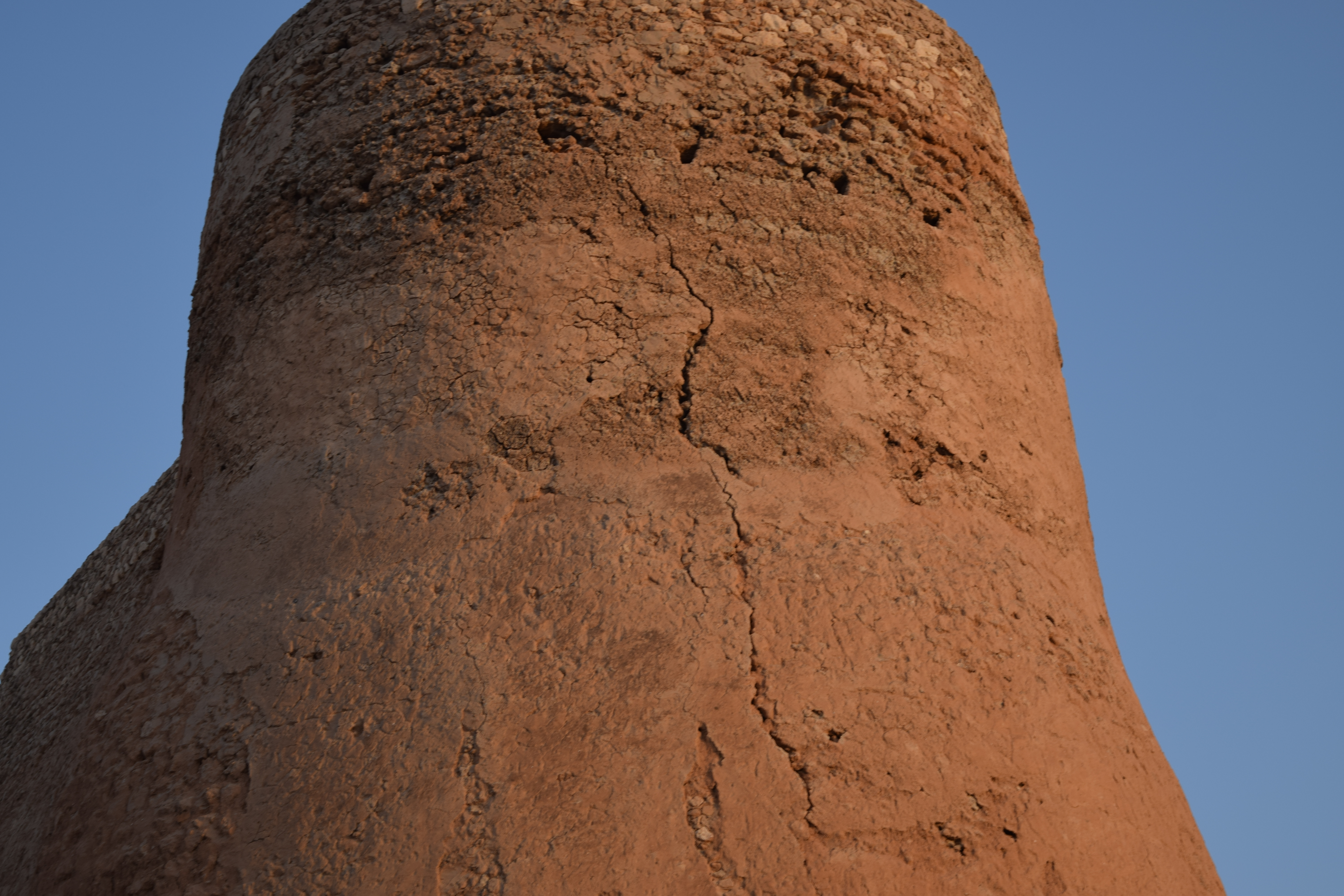
The northeastern tower of Tarut Castle, which is located next to the castle's eye, has cracked.

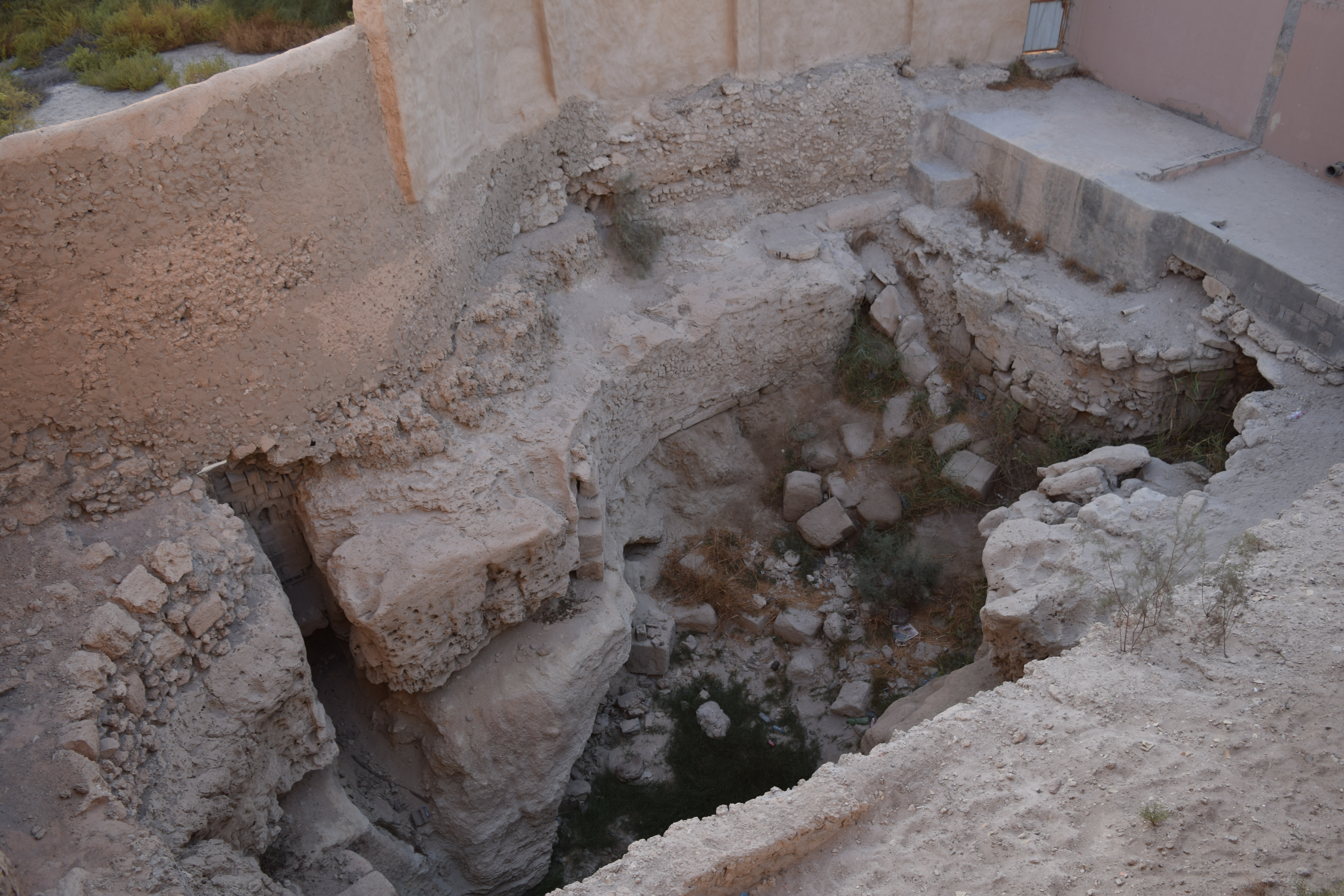
Depletion and drying of the castle's eye.

== Customs and traditions ==
- Wash Night or Bath Night: was a traditional custom that has largely disappeared from modern society. This event typically involved the bride receiving her friends, neighbors, and relatives in the afternoon or just before sunset. The gathering would form a large procession, led by the bride, as they sang and celebrated their way to one of the designated women's bathing sites, known locally as "eyes", such as Abu Luzah, Laghmiri, and Ain al-Awda. After enjoying a communal bath, the procession would return the bride to her home, continuing their joyful singing along the way.
- Jumping: Some islanders used to jump from the highest tower of Tarut Castle, the North Tower, and throw themselves into the waters of Ain al-Awda from a height of 27 metres, as it was deep in those days.

== Gallery ==
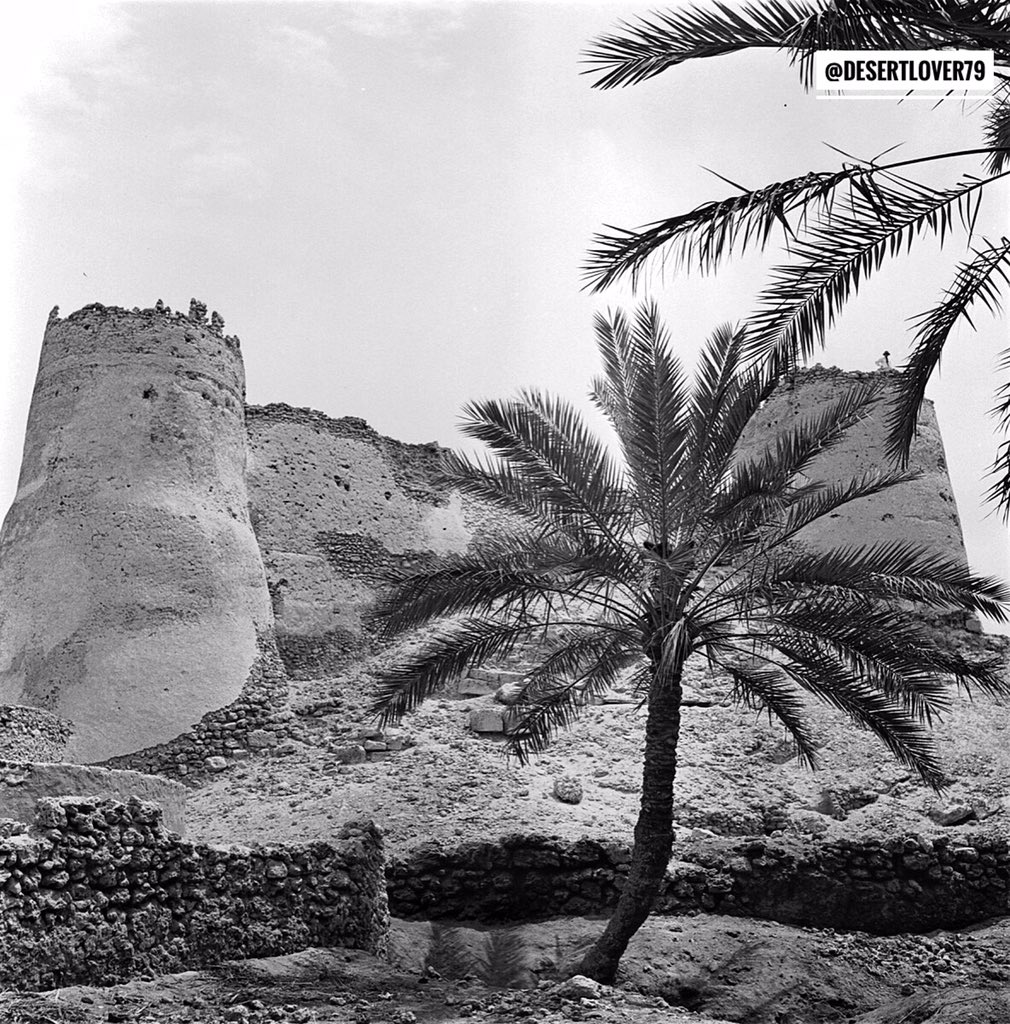

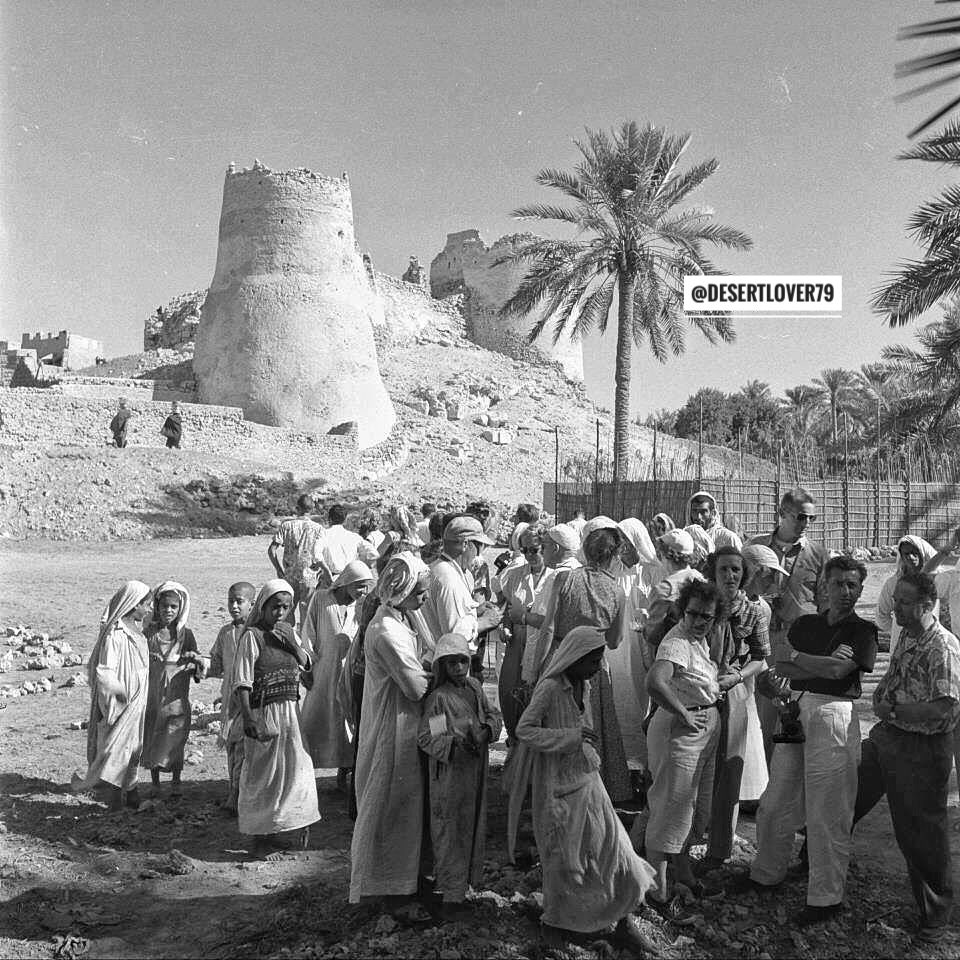
Tourists pose for a photo with locals in front of the castle. 1950s.

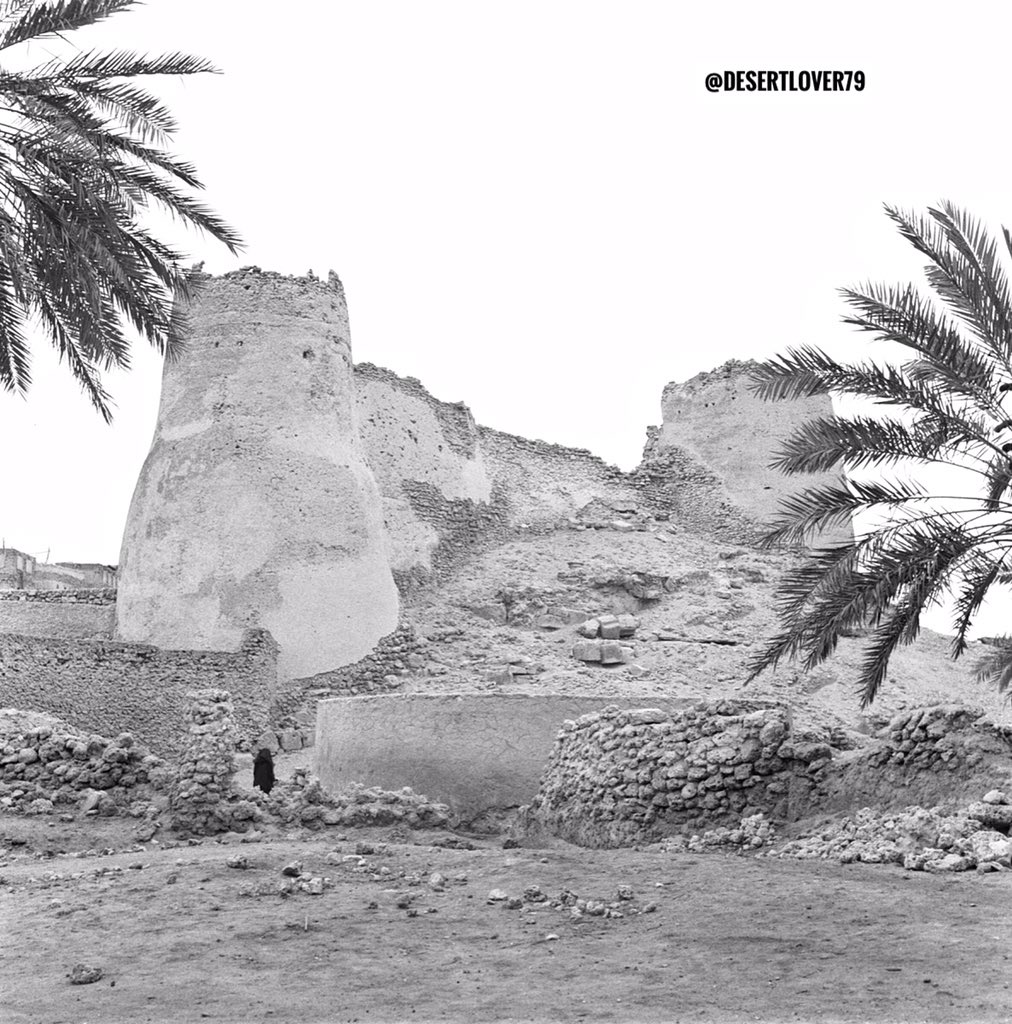

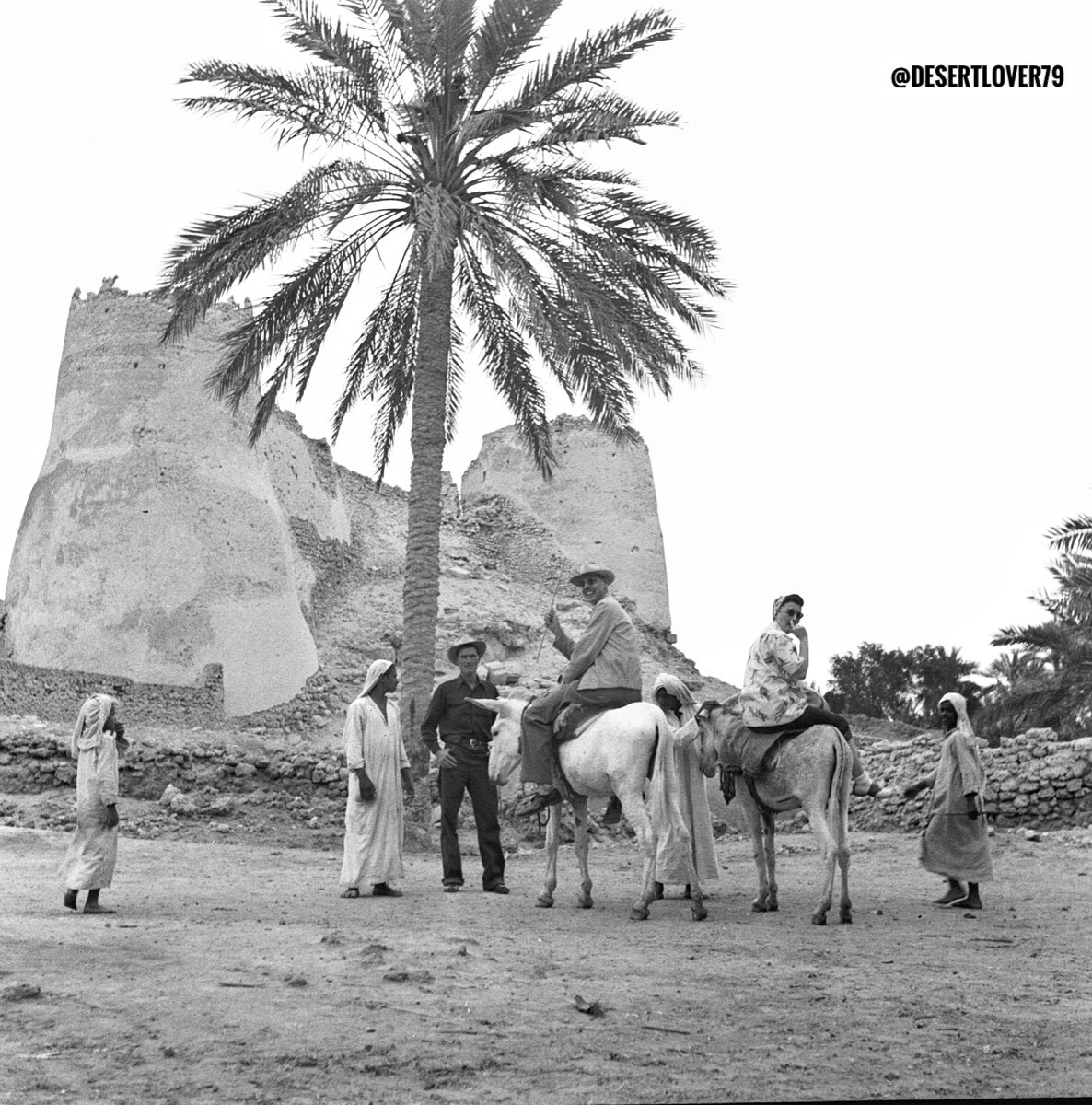

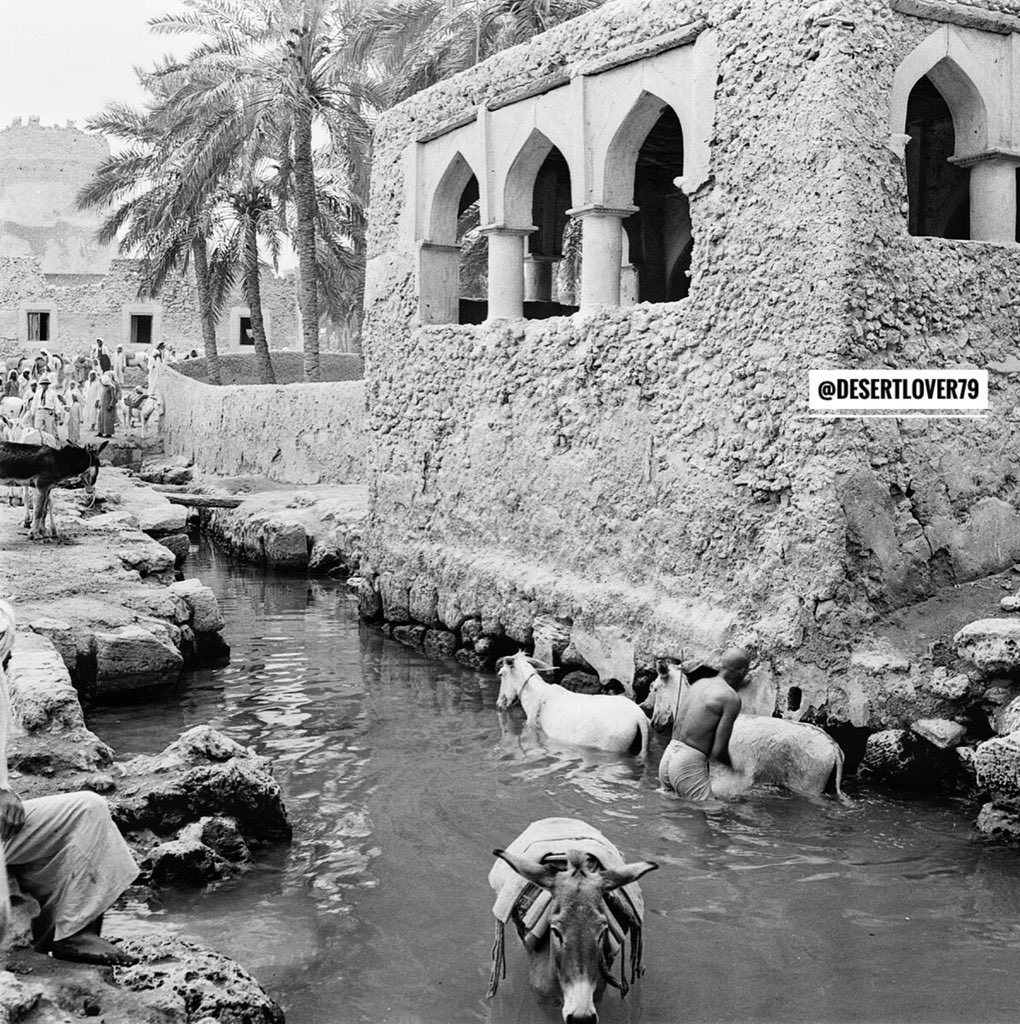

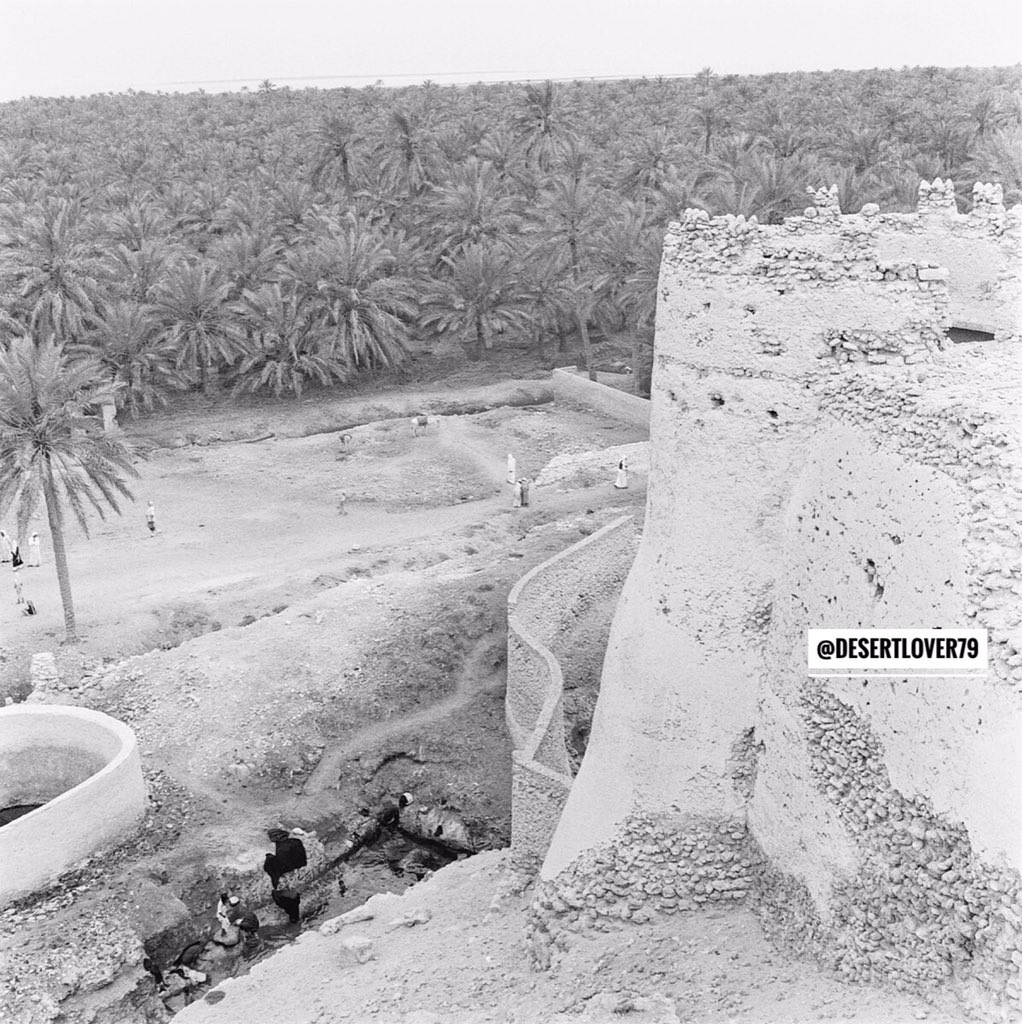

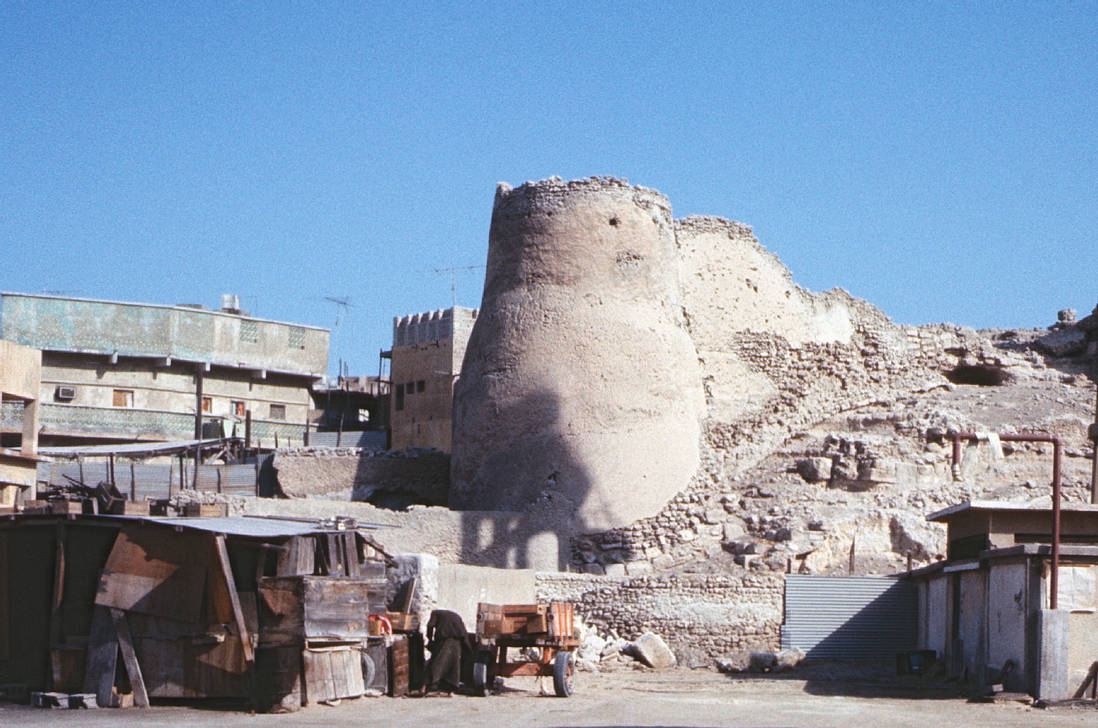
Side of the castle before restoration, 1982 AD

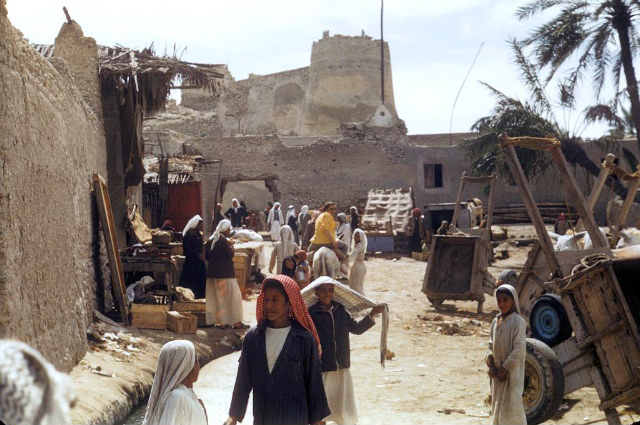
Tarut market, with the castle in the back, 1955.

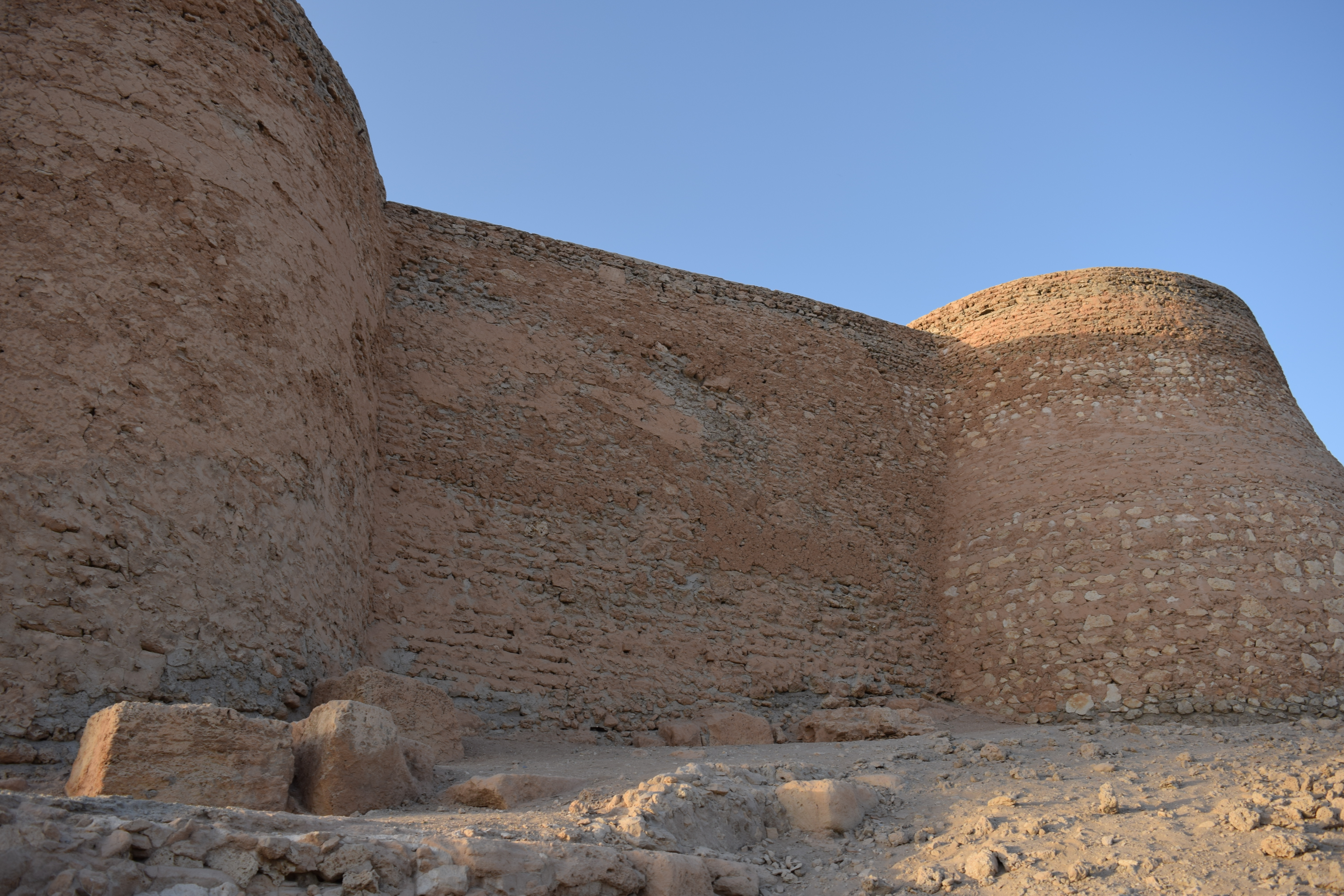
The western part of the castle.

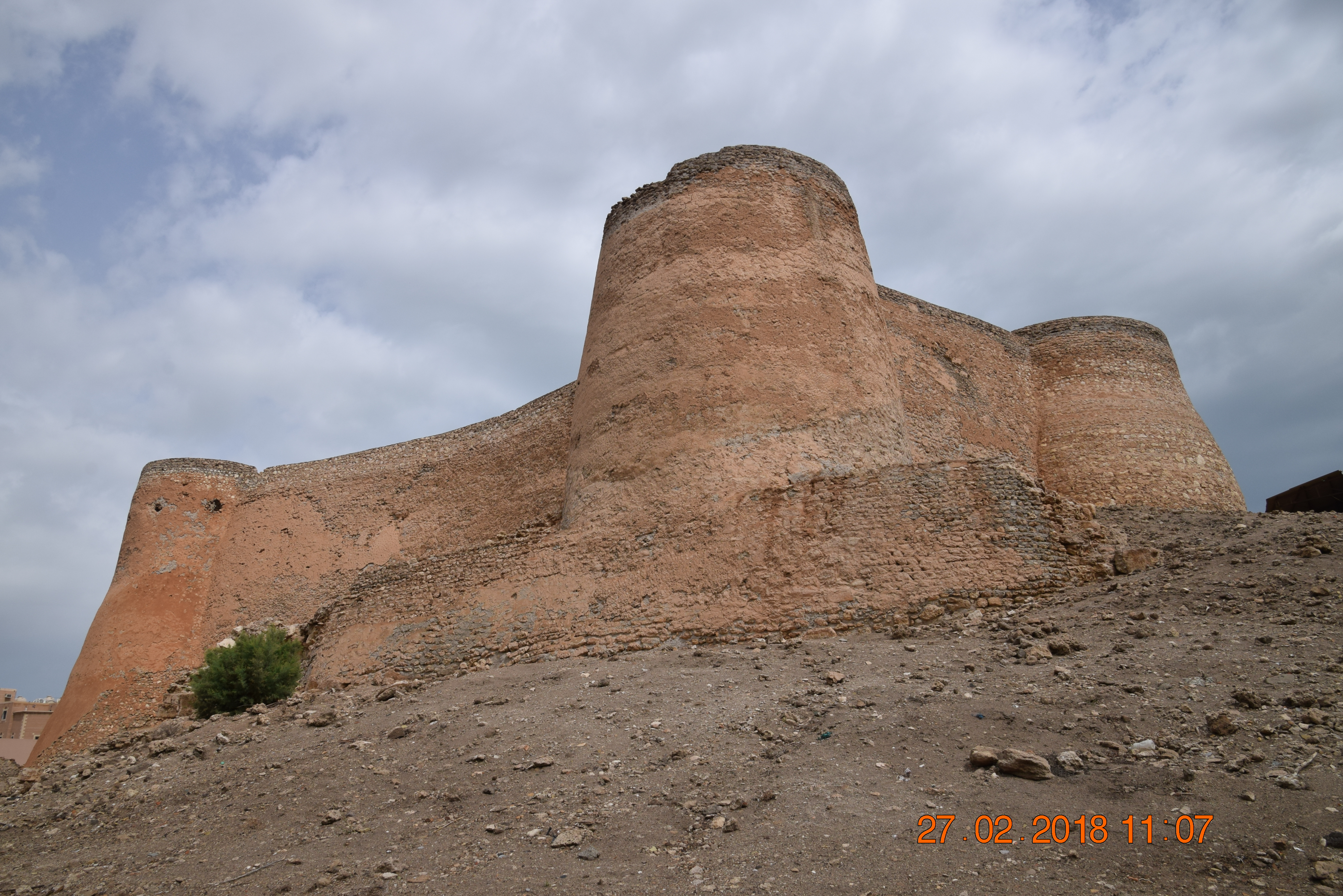
A recent photo of the castle

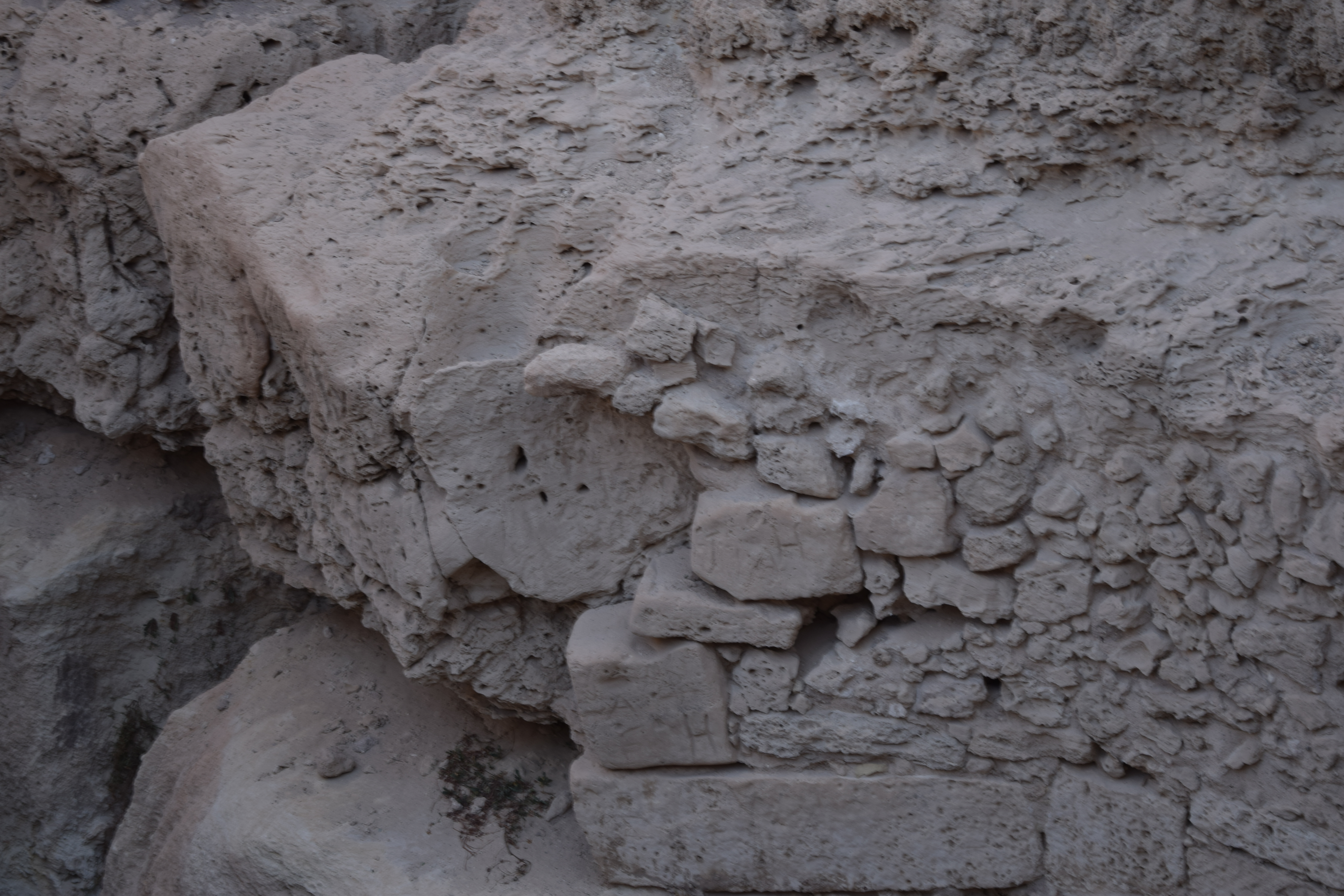
One of the foundation stones of the Temple of Ishtar on which the citadel was built.

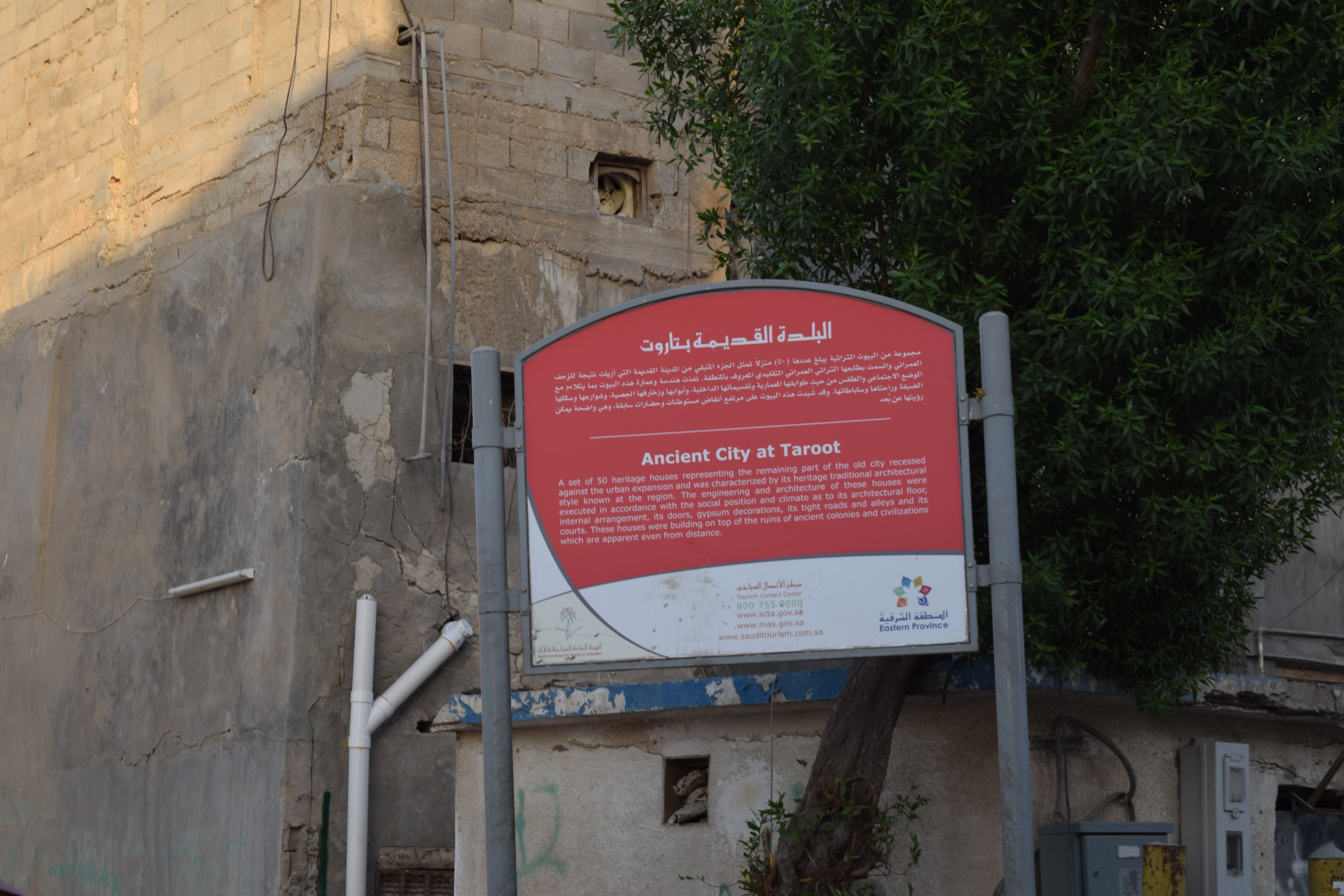
A signboard for the Deira neighborhood.

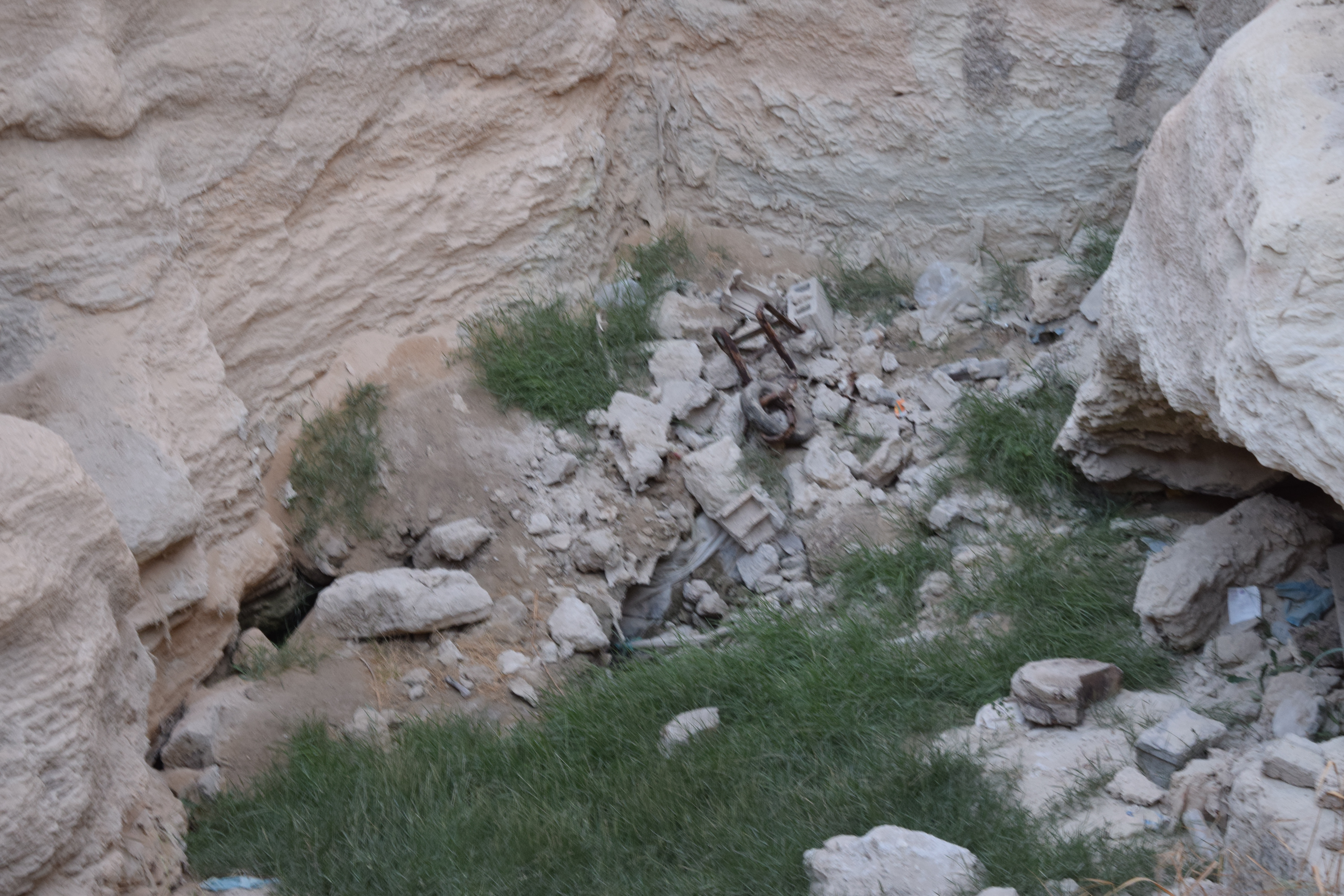
Part of the current castle's eye, which has dried up in the past decades. Weed growth and garbage dumping can be seen in the eye.

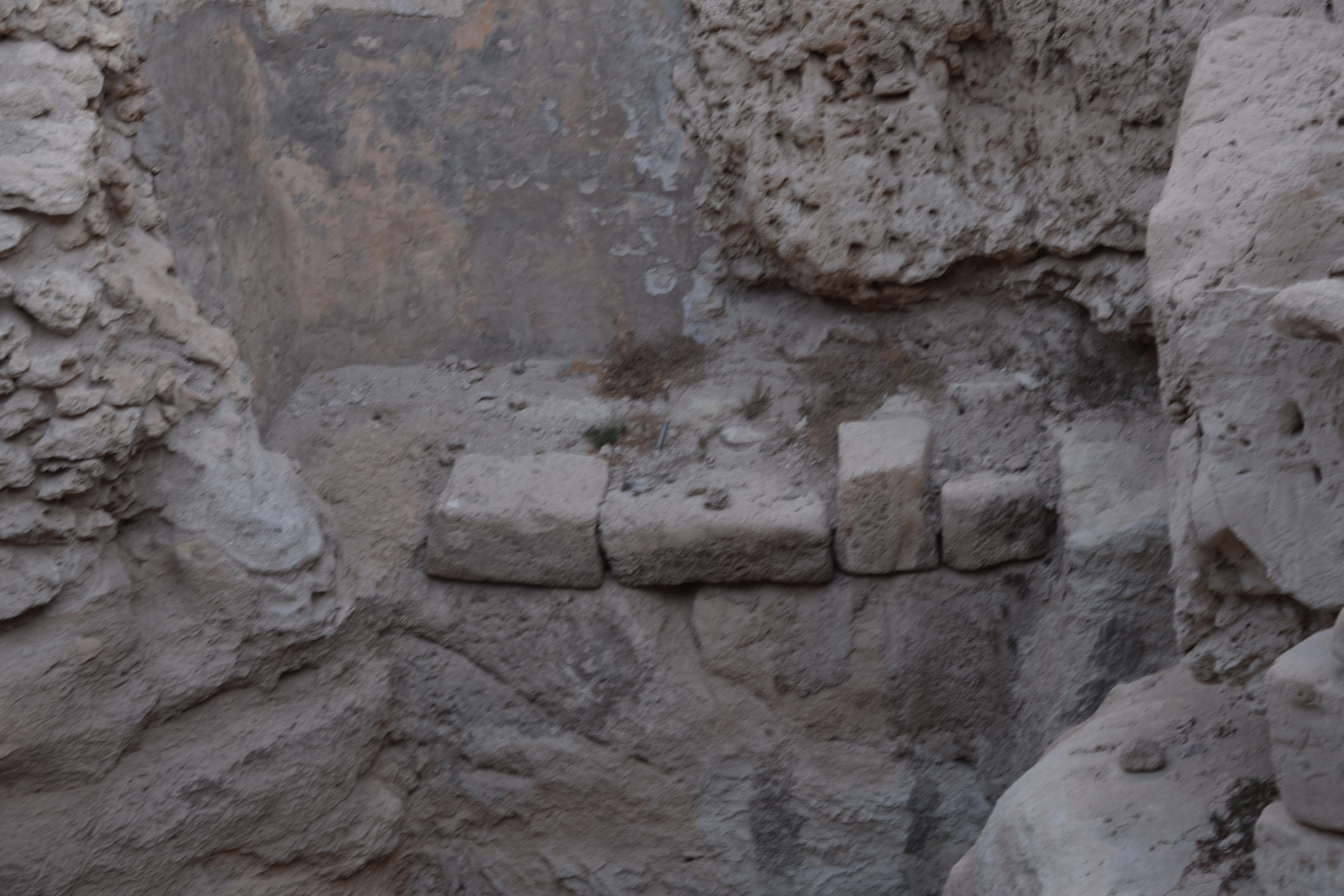
Another part of the foundation of the ancient temple located on the Ain al-Qalaa side under the northern tower.

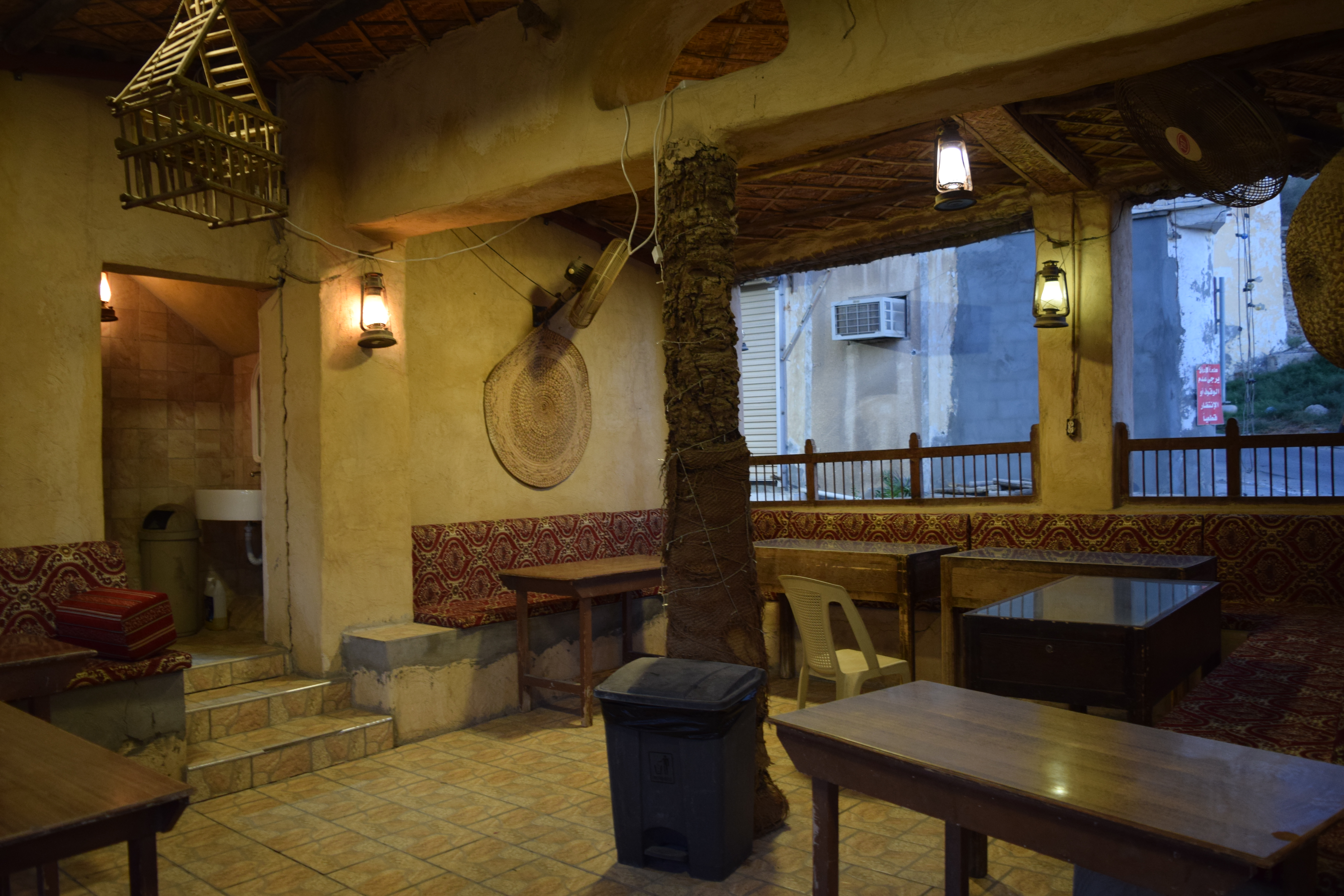
An interior view of the popular Tarut Castle Café, located next to the castle.

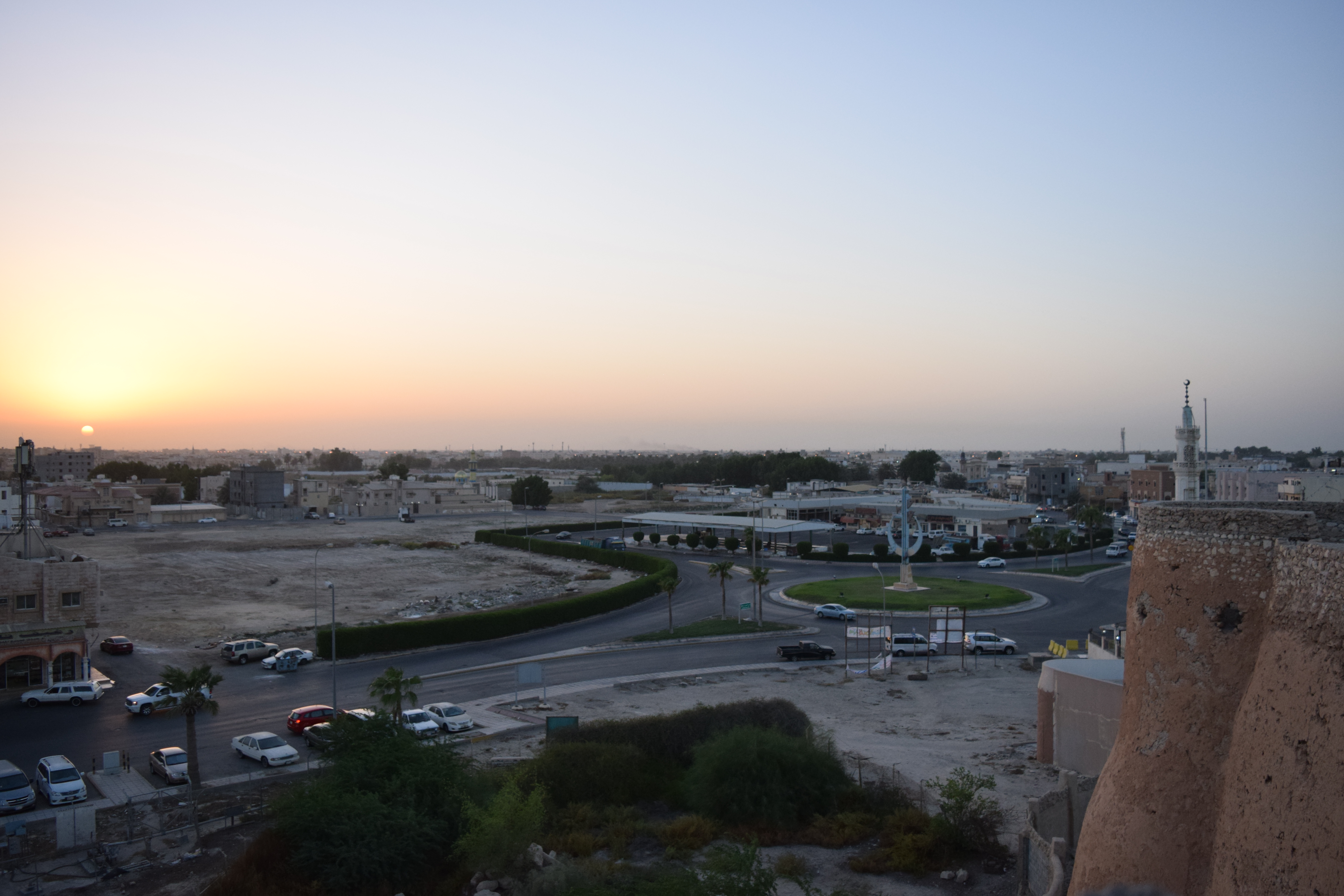
The view as seen from the top of the castle's northwest tower.

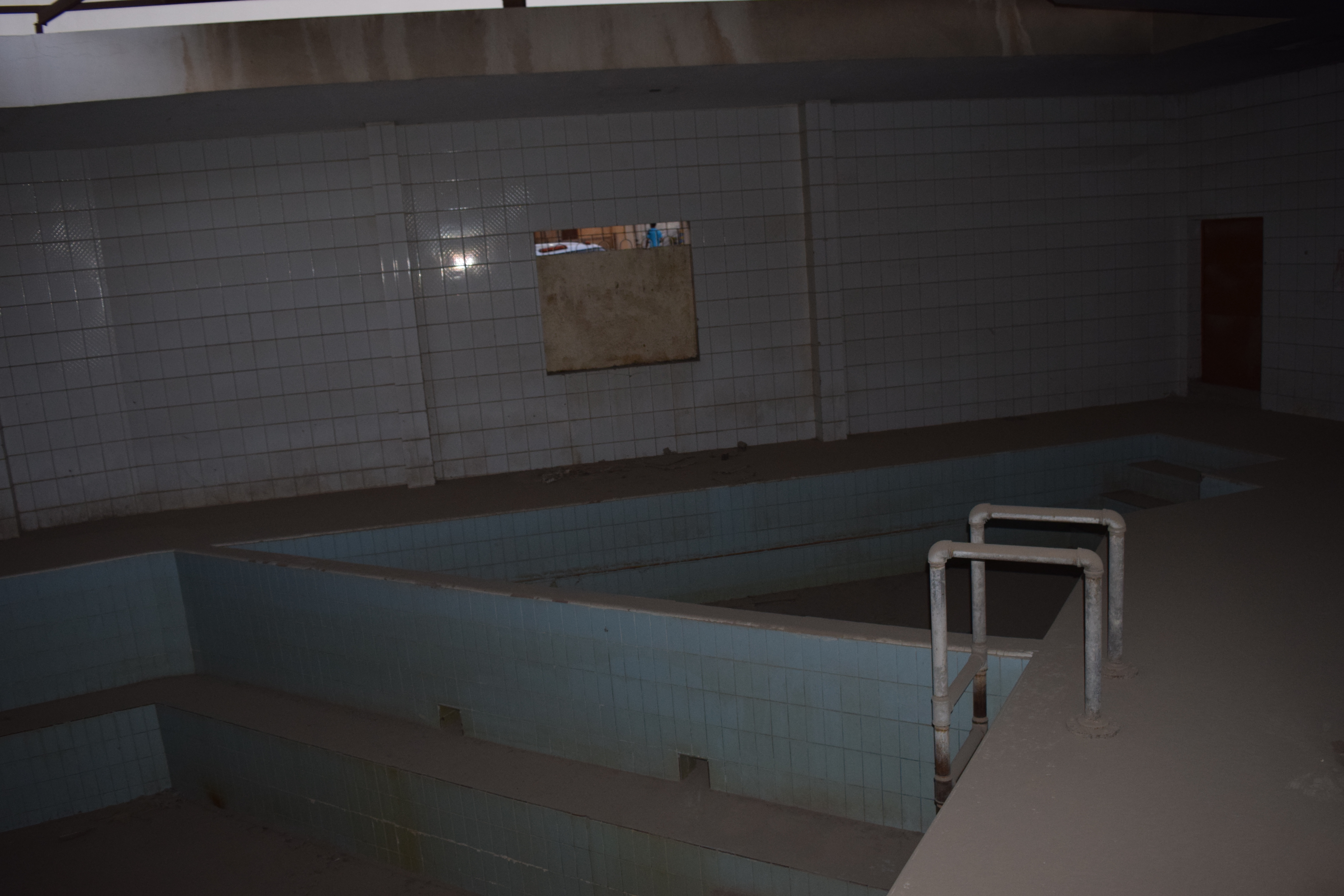
An interior view of the closed Tarot bath.

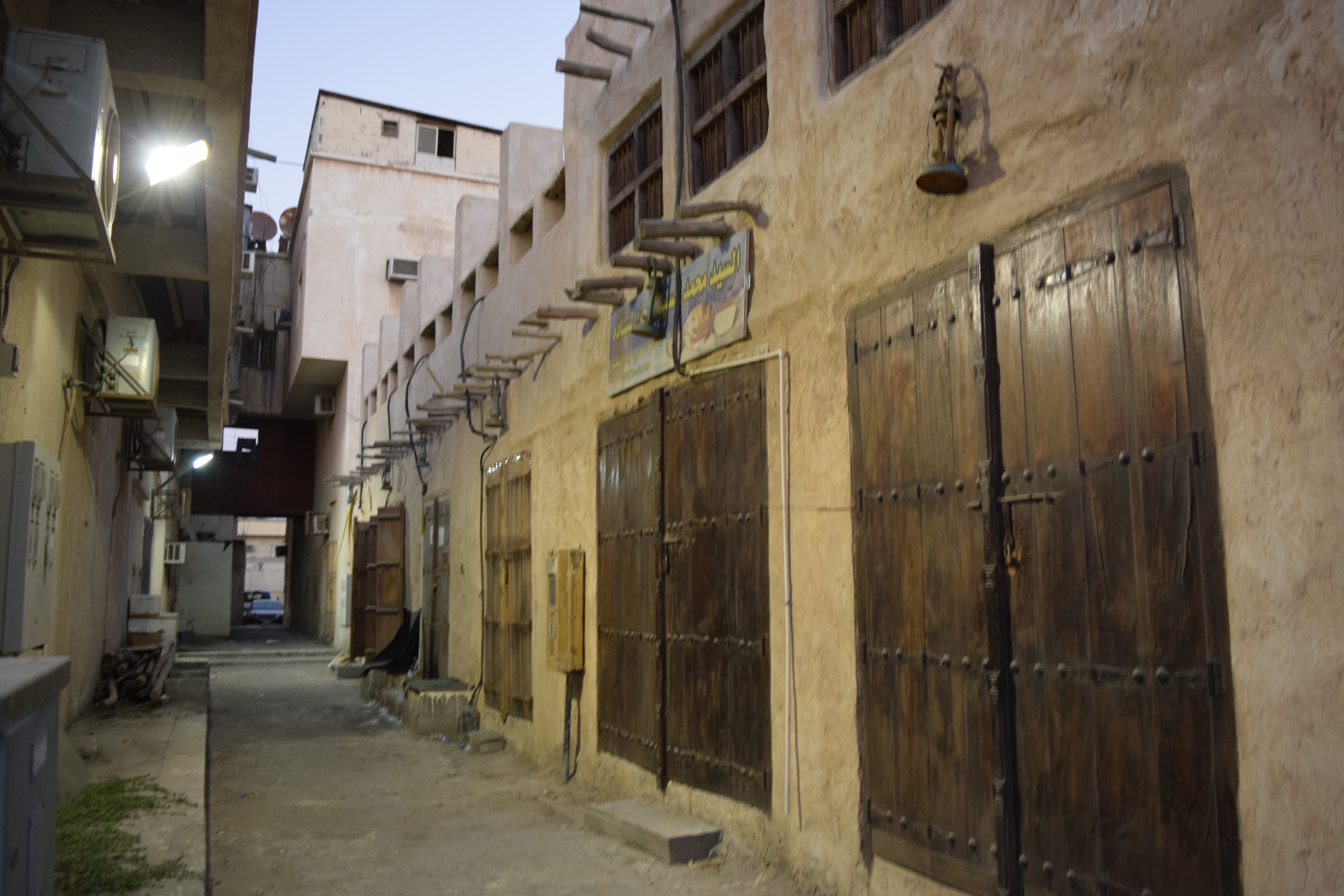
Artisan markets.

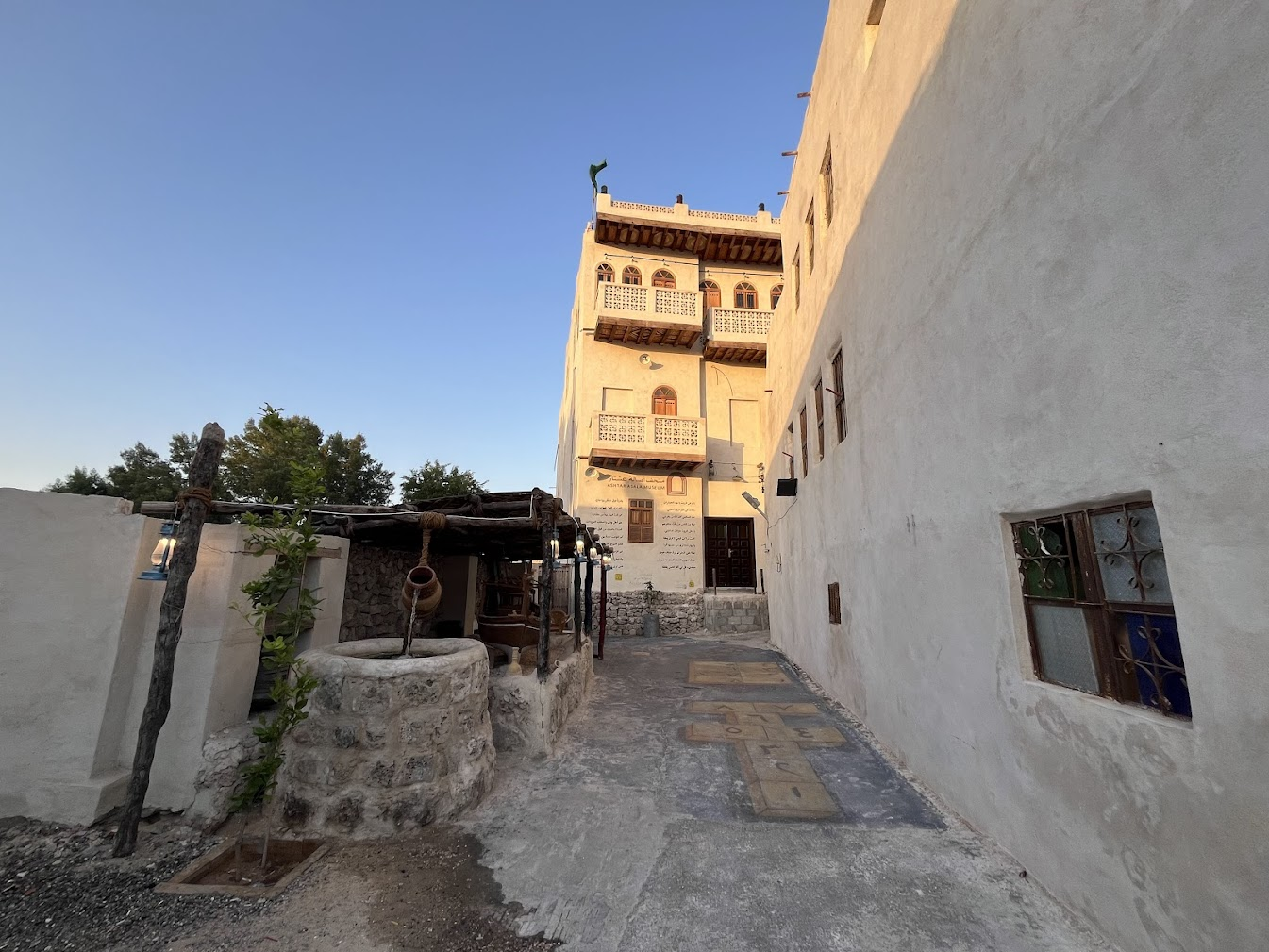
Ashtar Asala Museum at Tarout

== See also ==
- Qal'at al-Qatif
- Muhammad bin Abdul Wahhab Al Faihani Palace
- Qasr Ibrahim
- Muhaires Castle
- Sahood Fort
