= Qal'at al-Qatif =

Ancient fortress in Qatif, Saudi Arabia

Qatif castle
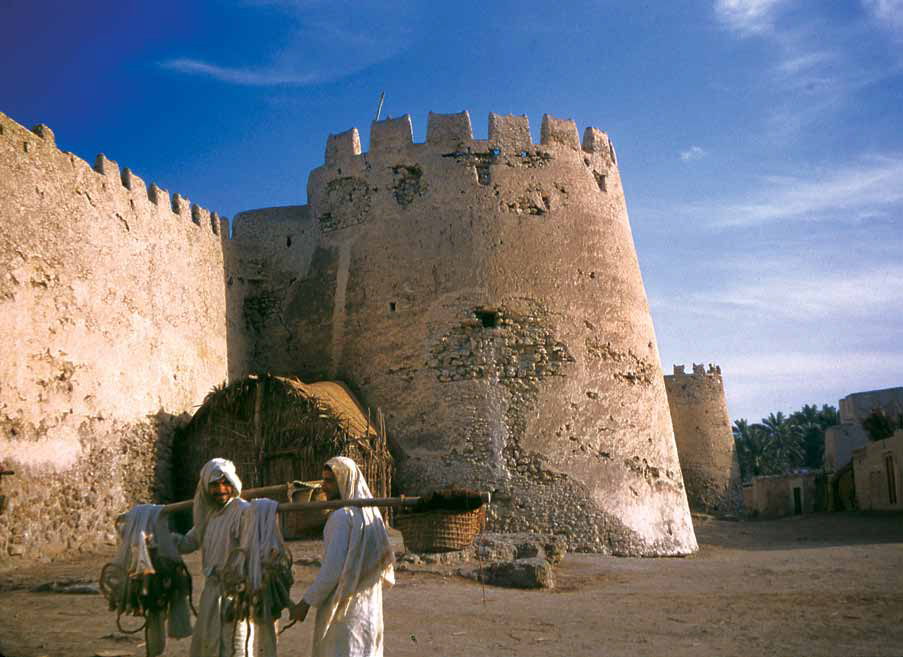
- A photograph from the 1940s shows a view of one of the towers of Qatif Castle.

General information
- Type: Fortress.
- Location: Castle area, Qatif, Eastern Province, Saudi Arabia, Saudi Arabia
- Coordinates: 26°33′36″N 50°0′36″E

Qal'at al-Qatif (Arabic: قلعة القطيف, romanized: Qalʿat al-Qaṭīf, lit. 'Qatif Castle'), also known as Hadaret Qatif, Qasbet Al-Qatif, Madenet Al-Qatef Al Mohasana, Al-Farda, or Al-Mahfouza, was an ancient fortress located in the heart of Qatif, a city in the Eastern Province of Saudi Arabia. The castle's origins trace back to the third century, built by the Sassanids. Later, in 1630 (1039 AH), the Ottoman Empire restored the castle, transforming it into a military base and strong point in the Persian Gulf. Over time, it also served as a warehouse for goods and a residential area.

The fortress housed eleven mosques, along with a royal court palace, guesthouses, and livestock pens, all of which were enclosed by a formidable wall. However, in the 1980s, Qatif Castle was demolished as part of a development project, following the 1979 Qatif Uprising. The area was gradually cleared of its houses and buildings, turning it into a public square and parking lots, leaving only 18 dilapidated structures.

Qatif Castle was oval-shaped, with an impregnable stone wall surrounding a densely populated residential district. British historian John Lorimer estimated the castle's dimensions at 365 meters on its eastern and western sides and 275 meters on its northern and southern sides. He also estimated its population to be around 5,000 people, with about 300 shops within its markets. The castle was surrounded by a deep trench, orchards, and farms, connecting it to the wider oasis of Qatif.

== Etymology ==
Qatif Castle derives its name from its central geographical location within the city of Qatif. Historically, it was the principal city of the region. The castle has been referred to by various names throughout its history, including Al-Qatif, Al-Qalaa, Al-Farda, Al-Mahfouz, and Madenet Al-Qatef Al Mohasana. It is also commonly called Qasbet Al-Qatif.

After the establishment of the castle as the seat of the emirate and governance for the Qatif region, the name was simplified to Qatif. Some historians and local residents also refer to it as Al-Mahfouzah, a name derived from the date of the wall's reconstruction, completed in 1039 AH (1630). The Arabic alphabet was used to represent the number 1039, which corresponds to the word "Mahfouzah."

The term Madenet Al-Qatef Al Mohasana was used to describe the area due to its population density and commercial activity. Another name, Faradah, is believed to have originated from the village of Faradh in Bahrain, associated with the Bani Amer bin Al-Harith bin Al-Qais tribe. This name was widely used in sales and trade documents by the people of Faradah, the residents of Qatif Castle.

The castle was known as Jibaro or Jippro in Latin documentation. This name persisted until more recent times when the site became more commonly referred to as Qatif Castle.

== Geography ==
Qatif Castle was situated on a high hill, surrounded by residential areas and water sources. Historically, the oasis of Qatif was encircled by palm trees and farms along the shore parallel to the oasis. Although located on the eastern side near the sea, the tide did not reach the oasis except during periods of high tide in the middle and late phases of the lunar month.

The hilly terrain of the area presented challenges when digging wells within the castle. Workers had to cut through rock and remove sand to access water, a labor-intensive and time-consuming process. The wells within the citadel ranged in depth from five to eight meters from the surface to the groundwater.

The site of the former Qatif Castle is now situated from the area of Zurayb to the extension of King Abdulaziz Street, extending to the Qatif Governorate Municipality and the fish market, reaching the intersection near the post and telegraph office.

== Castle scheme ==
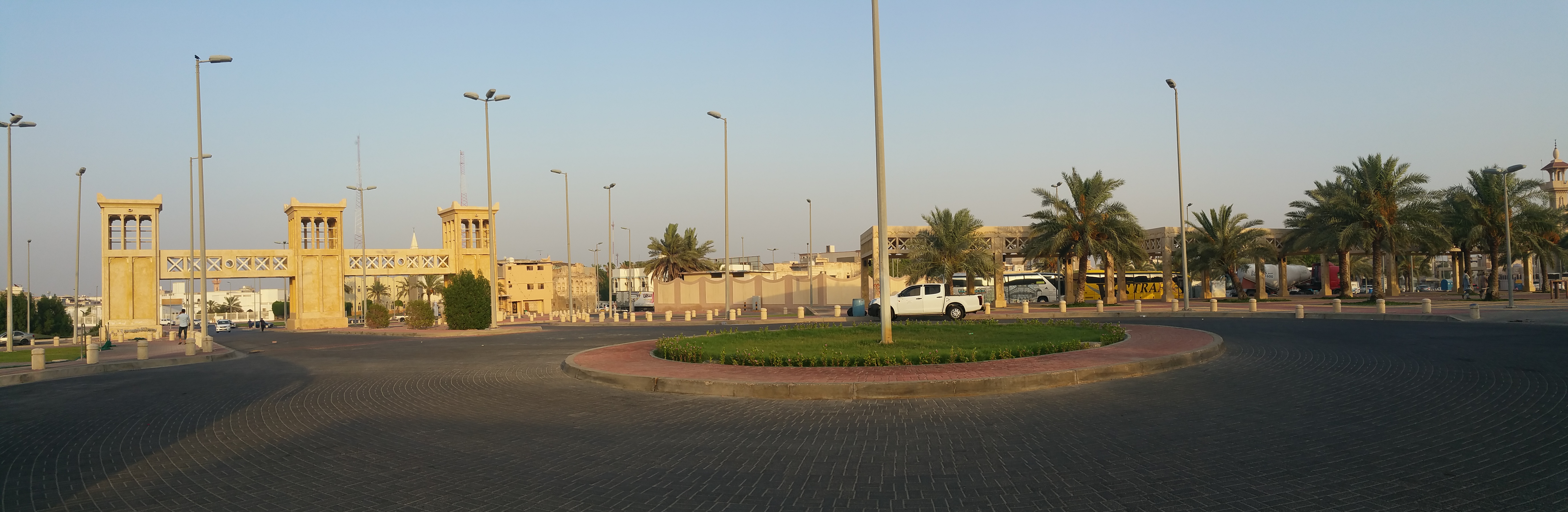

=== General design ===
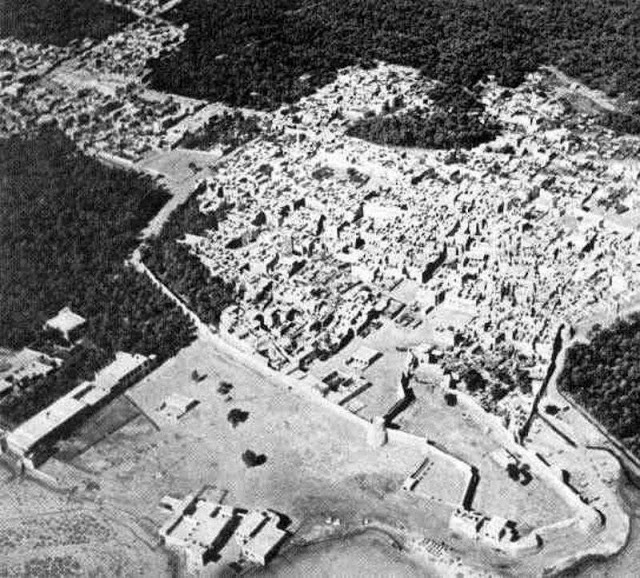
An aerial view showing the fortified houses and neighborhoods of Qatif Castle. The photo was taken in the 1950s.

Qatif Castle was an oval-shaped fortress, surrounded by an impregnable stone wall that enclosed a densely populated residential area. The castle was bordered by a deep trench and numerous orchards on all sides except the seaward side. These orchards, known as Dawali, were irrigated from the Toubi Seyha.

The markets within the castle, estimated by Wimmer to consist of around 300 shops, began at Darwaza al-Souq and ended near al-Dababiya, an area now part of King Abdulaziz Street. The market was a roofed, gable-shaped path flanked by two rows of stores, extending from the intersection of Schools Street to Jaafar Al-Khatti Street, before turning west along the same street. The market area, historically referred to as the Freedom Market, concluded at a large gate that remained open during the day and was closed at night. The market stretch also included the site where Zain Al-Abidin Primary School currently stands.

The royal palaces within Qatif Castle were located in a mountainous area at the center of the citadel, which historically served as the seat of government. To the southwest were the hospitality palaces and the remaining suburban areas of the citadel, collectively referred to as the Khan's Lane. The Khan's neighborhood and cattle sheds were positioned between the northern and southern parts of the Zarib neighborhood.

The royal court was surrounded by extensive gardens and vineyards, which began at the Karidi stream, adjacent to the Minaret Mosque, and extended northward to the Warash district.

=== Tower ===
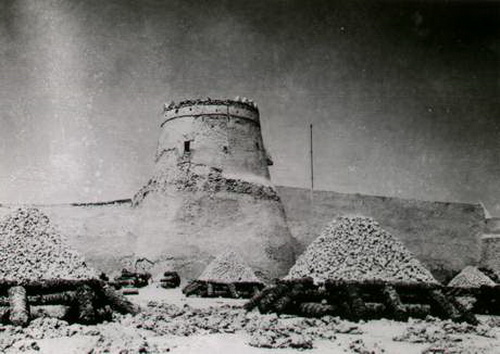
One of the castle's towers with its wall.

Qatif Castle featured 11 round towers located at each corner and protruding between the walls and corners of the structure. Each tower was equipped with rooms, restrooms, and service shops. A two-meter-wide bridge along the top of the wall connected the towers, allowing guards to move between them, often patrolling on horseback during the night for surveillance and security.

Despite the presence of 11 towers, historical records from the Portuguese era described Qatif as a fortified city with seven towers.

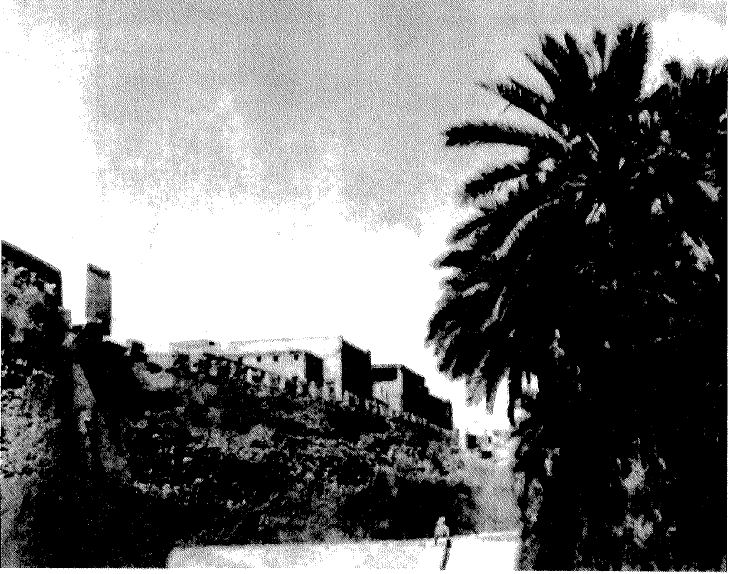
A view of the wall of Qatif Castle.

=== Fences ===
The citadel wall of Qatif Castle is a formidable structure constructed from rocks and stones, reinforced with burnt stucco on a broad base of stucco and bricks. The wall reaches a height of approximately 10 meters and was designed to protect the citadel from attacks and raids. It was last reconstructed during the reign of Sultan Selim II on the first day of Muharram in 968 AH (September 1560 CE) and underwent further renovations during the governorship of Ali Pasha in 1039 AH (1630 CE).

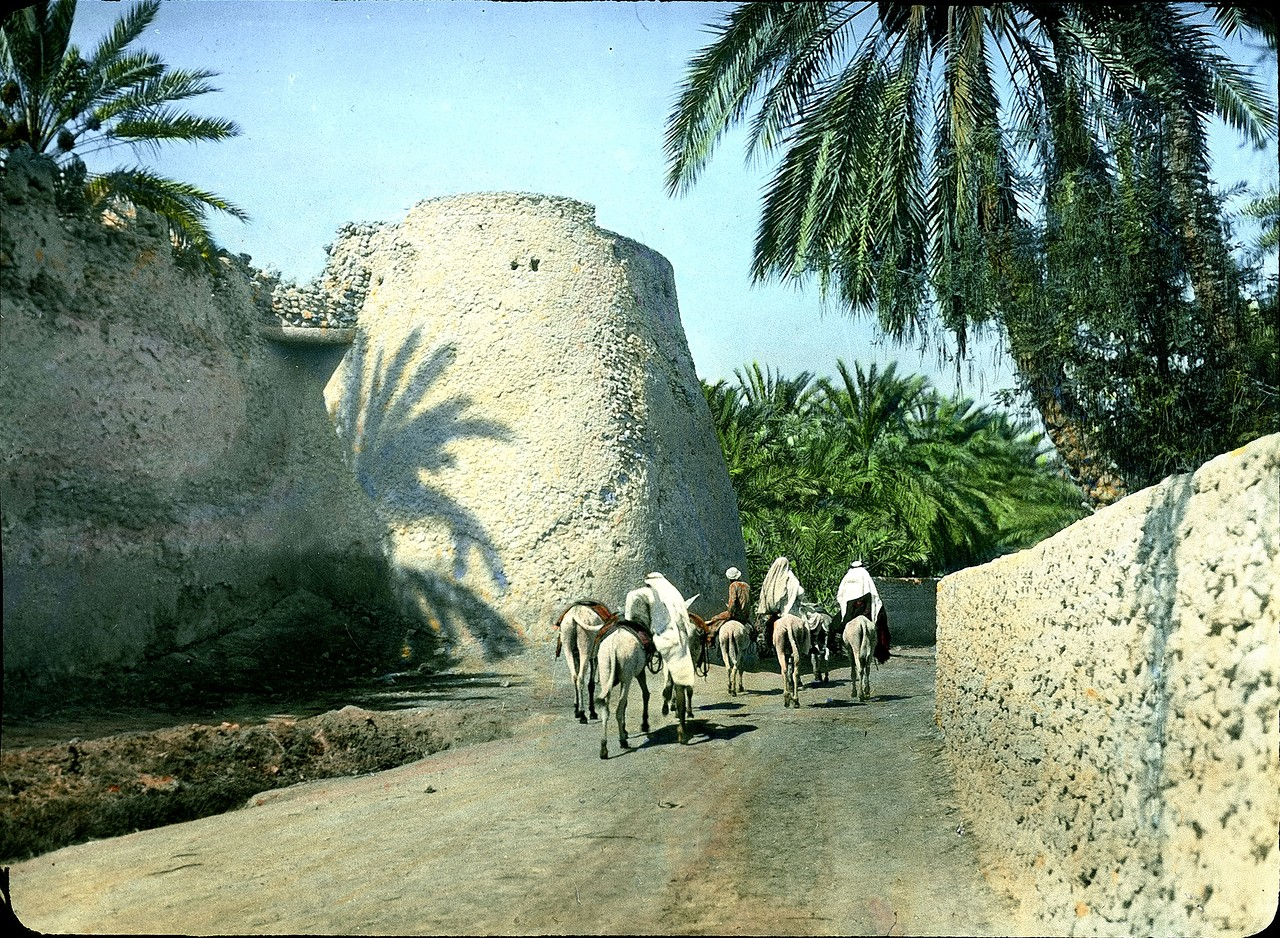
Part of the tower and wall of Qatif Castle.

The thickness of the wall varies along its length, with the eastern side measuring about 13 feet thick, while some sections Fluctuation to as little as 7 feet. In the late 1960s to early 1970s, the wall was gradually dismantled by the municipality, citing the need to accommodate increased security, population growth, and urban expansion beyond the old city limits.

=== Gates ===
Qatif Castle is protected by four substantial iron-armored gates, known locally as darwazas. Each gate is staffed by a guard responsible for securing the entrance after Isha prayer and for opening it at dawn during times of peace.

Among these gates, the eastern gate, Darwazat al-Bahr, serves as the sole access point to the port, which lies to the east of the citadel. The western gate, Darwazat north gate, connects the citadel to the Qatif oasis and the surrounding countryside, positioned between the Al-Khan and Zur neighborhoods. The north gate neighborhood is located just past Ayb, while the market gate to the south of the citadel serves as the main entrance to the market, which is situated immediately beyond this gate.

The fourth gate, located on the northeast side of the fortress, connects it to a small fort adjacent to it from the north, providing access to Al-Kut.

A photograph taken on May 8, 1945, depicts two terraces leading to Qatif Castle, with locals visible inside the structure.

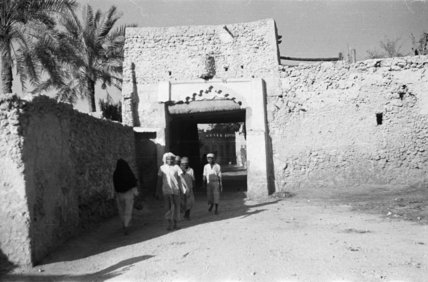

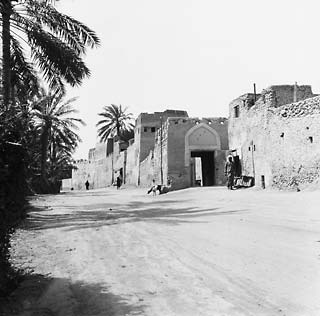

=== Mast ===
The structure was mounted on the interior wall of Qatif Castle at a height of approximately 2.5 meters and a width of two meters. It connected the towers and was equipped with openings for observation and rifle firing. During enemy attacks, defenders would use this vantage point to fire upon the attackers, forcing them to retreat under a barrage of gunfire.

=== Neighborhoods ===
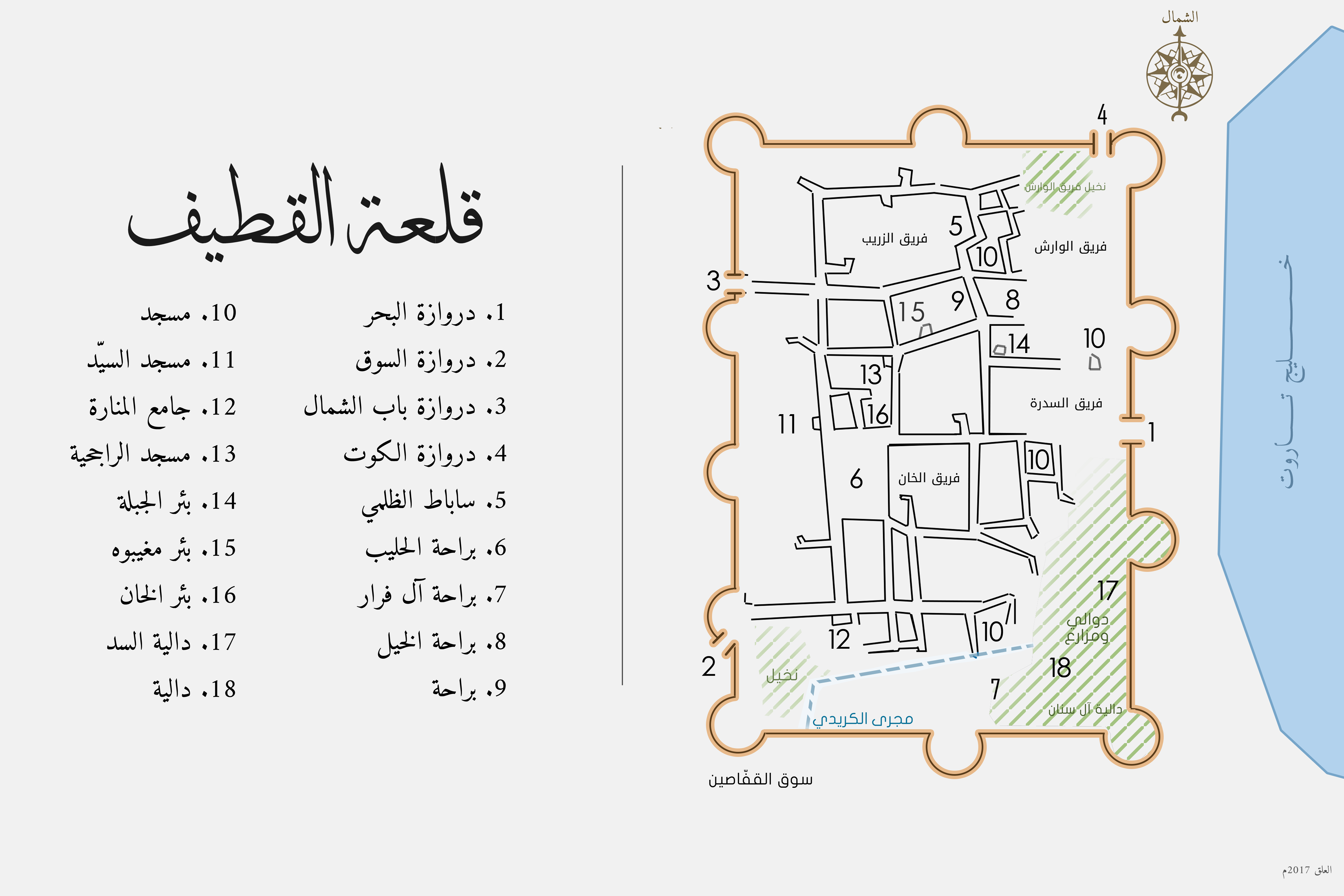

Qatif Castle was historically divided into four distinct neighborhoods: Al-Khan (southwest), Al-Zurayb (northwest), Al-Warsh (northeast), and Al-Sidra (southeast). These areas were connected by narrow roads and dark alleys, with Al-Dhulami's alley in Al-Zurayb being the most prominent. Before the removal of the citadel wall, the castle was also surrounded by several other neighborhoods, including Al-Sharia, Bab Al-Shamal (the north gate), Al-Kuwaikib, Al-Madaris, Al-Dababiya, Al-Jarari, Al-Shuwaika, and Mias.

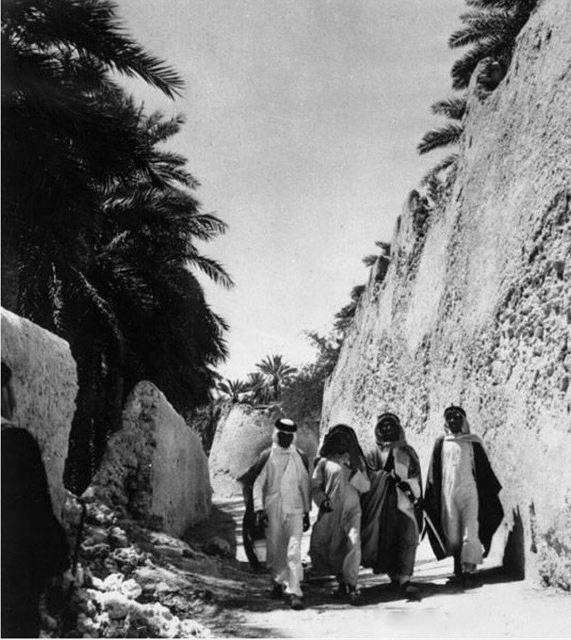
A view of the Qatif Castle wall with locals strolling beside it.

Following the demolition of the castle wall by the municipality in the late 1960s to early 1970s, new neighborhoods were established, such as Al-Bustan, Bab Al-Sab, Al-Madani, Al-Masoudiya, Umm Al-Hazm, and Al-Bahr, alongside the existing neighborhoods that once surrounded the citadel. The cultivated area of the former Qatif Citadel extended from Darwaza al-Souq to Mawrd al-Kraidi and Mahalla al-Warash. However, the orchards that once surrounded the castle and its surroundings have since been redeveloped into residential neighborhoods. For instance, the orchards adjacent to the market, such as Dabikha and Dalia, have been transformed into markets and commercial centers.

==== Al-Khan neighborhood ====
Al-Khan is located to the southwest of Qatif Castle and is characterized by sunlit roads and breezy paths. The term "Wakhan" is believed to have Persian origins, though it also carries other meanings, such as "shop" or "ruler" and "prince."

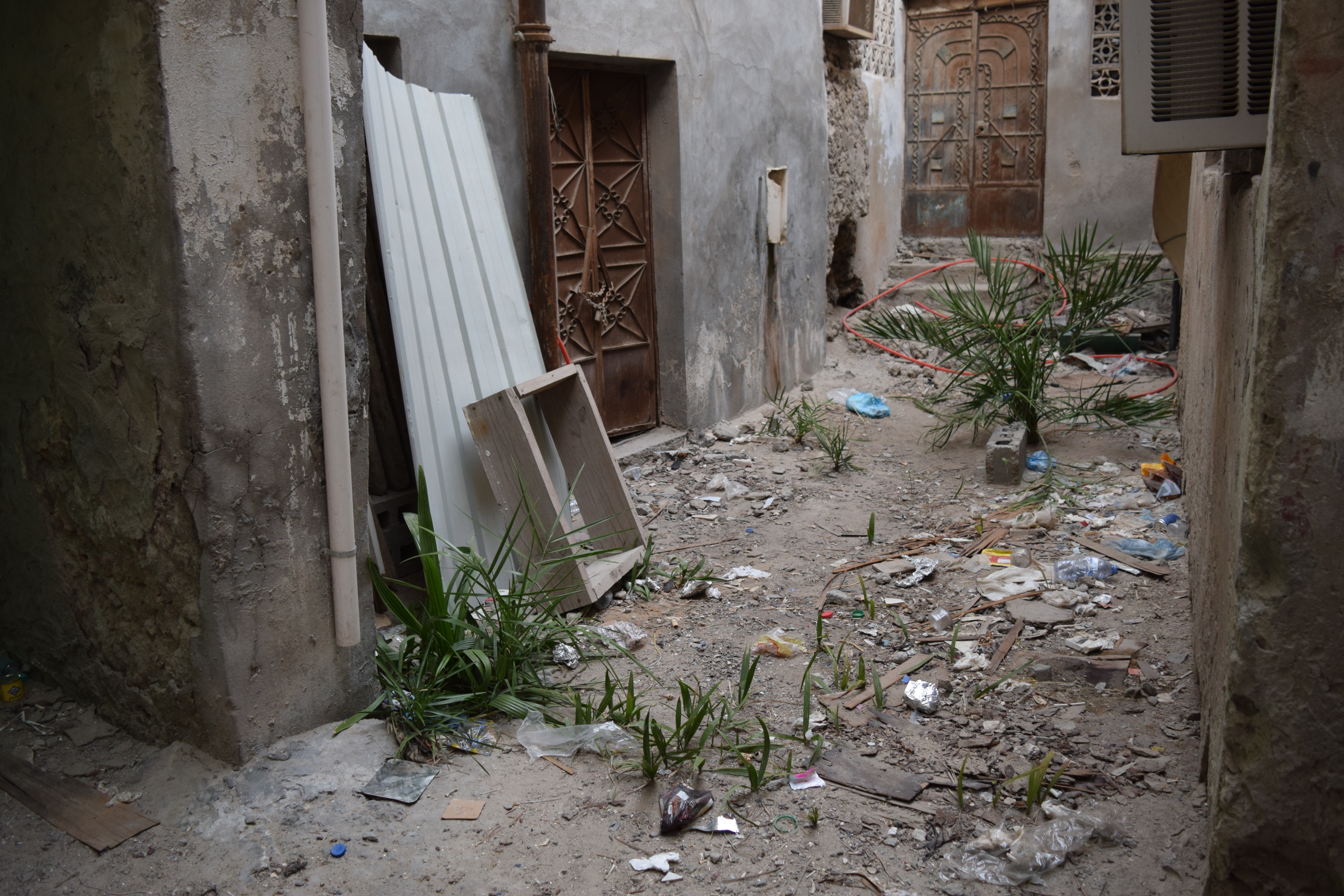
A view of the ruins of ancient houses in the Zurayb neighborhood, where small palm trees have begun to grow due to the fertile soil of the area.

==== Al-Zurayb neighborhood ====
Zurayb is situated to the northwest of the castle. The name Zarib is derived from the word Zarb, which means 'livestock barn'. Additionally, Zarib is the diminutive form of Zarb, which also signifies 'entrance to the waterway'. The neighbourhood comprises a group of adjacent two- or three-storey houses, separated from each other by narrow streets and alleys that widen in certain locations to become courtyards and narrow in others to allow only the passage of people and animals. The remaining houses in this neighbourhood are evidence of traditional Qatifi architecture. The architectural fabric consists of mosques, katatatib schools, houses, and the remains of the Qatif Castle wall. This is the only neighbourhood still inhabited by the local population.

==== Al-Warsh neighborhood ====
Al-Warsh neighborhood is located to the northeast of Qatif Castle. The term "warsh" can mean "impulse" or "active" and may also refer to a parasite that is eager to eat.

==== Al-Sidra neighborhood ====
Al-Sidra neighborhood is located to the southeast of Qatif Castle and takes its name from the Sidr tree, also known as the buckthorn tree. The name is believed to have originated in the early days of the neighborhood's formation, when the area was surrounded by palm trees, Sidr trees, and various fruit trees to the south and east.

=== Extensions ===
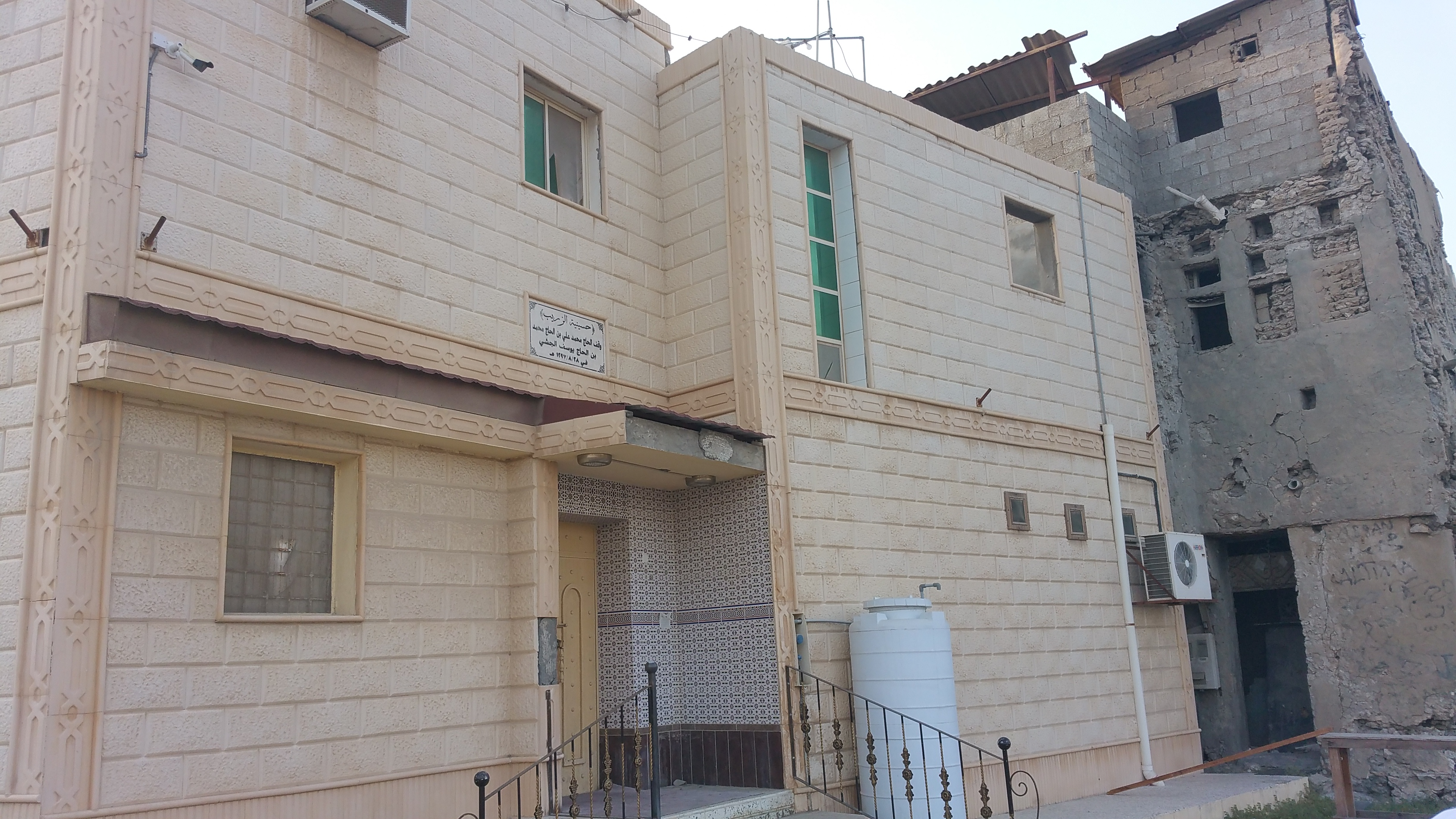
The renovated façade of Husseiniyah al-Zurayb, founded by Muhammad Ali Muhammad Yusuf al-Jishi, was established on the 28th of Sha'ban, 1297 AH.

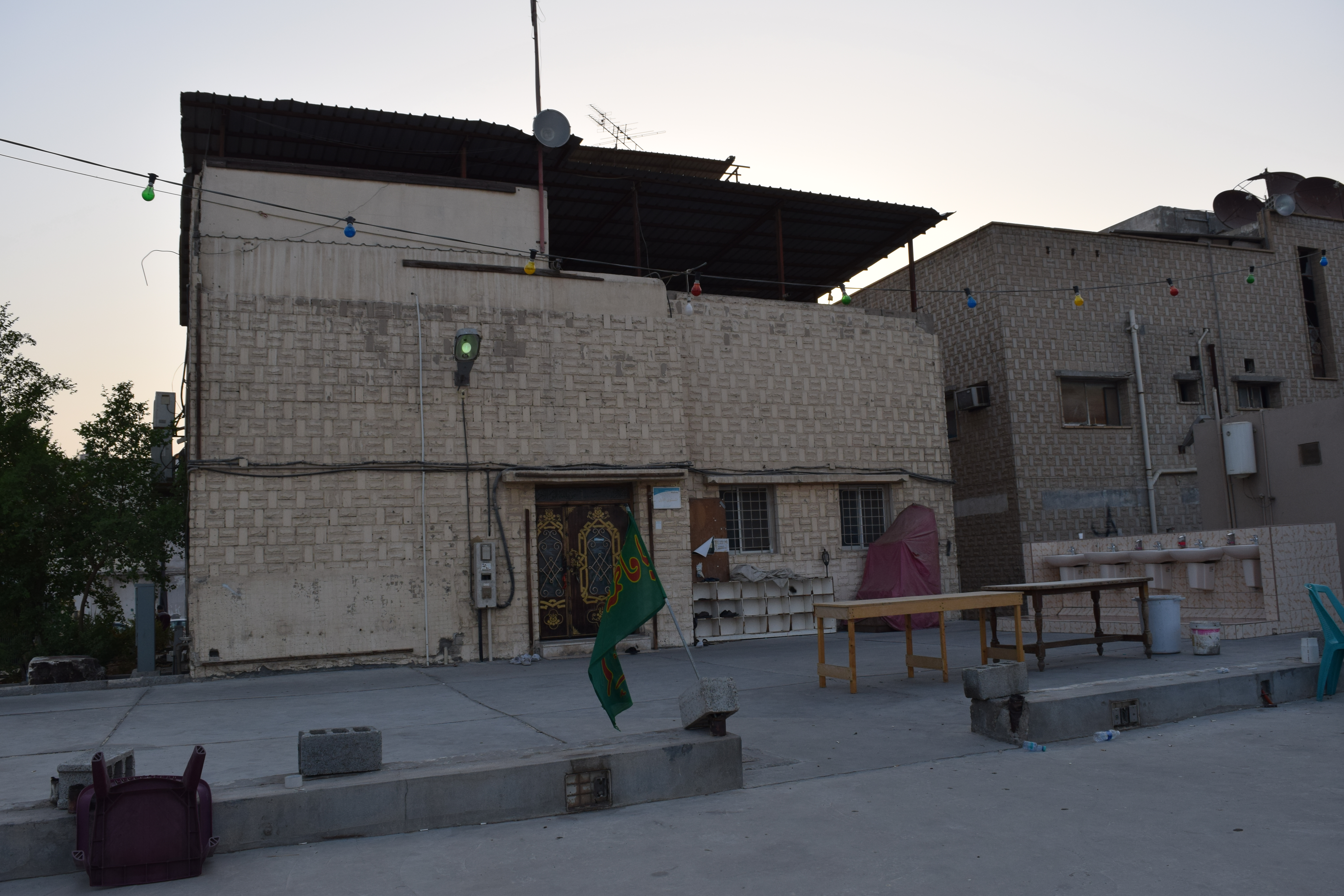
A view of the façade of the Matter Mosque located within Qatif Castle.

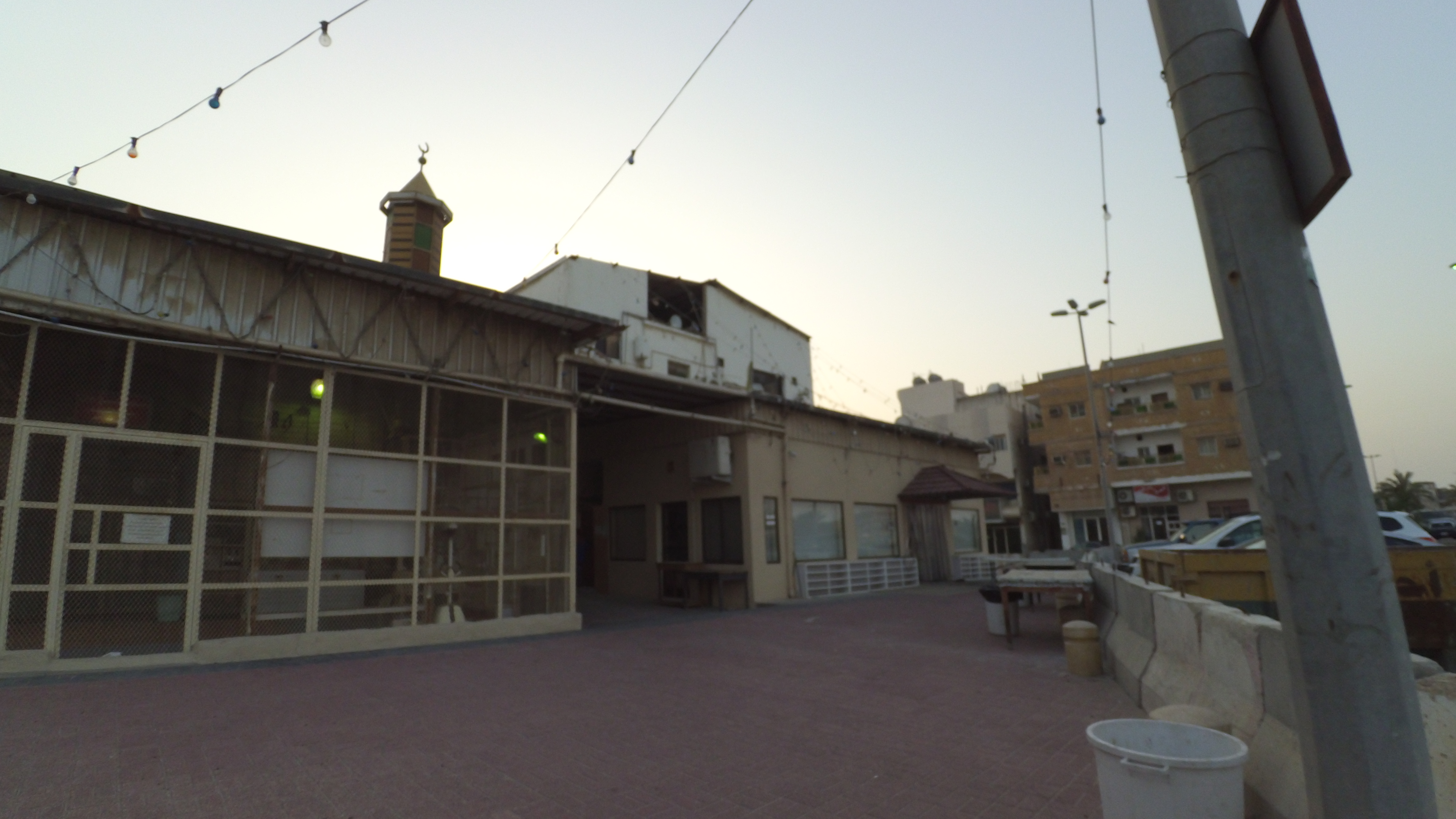
The façade of a mosque located within Qatif Castle.

The most notable facilities within Qatif Castle included mosques and Husseiniyas, with a total of 11 mosques recorded. Among these, the oldest are Al-Manara and Al-Sidra, both dating back to the eighth century AH. Other mosques in the castle include Al-Rajhiya, Al-Khan, and Al-Barouda. The construction of Al-Sidra Mosque is also attributed to the eighth century AH, as indicated by a stone slab affixed to the entrance of its 30-meter-high round lighthouse, which offered a view of the metropolis and its suburbs. This lighthouse sustained significant damage when struck by a cannonball in 1871 AD during the Ottoman occupation, affecting its upper portion. It was later restored by the municipality during the reign of King Abdulaziz and repurposed for lighting, with a gas lamp capable of producing 400 candlepower installed at the top. It is believed that the Sidra Mosque may have been constructed on the site of an earlier structure, as some sources suggest it was originally an ancient temple that was subsequently abandoned and fell into disrepair. However, the original minaret has since been removed, and the mosque has been rebuilt.

==== Al-Kut ====
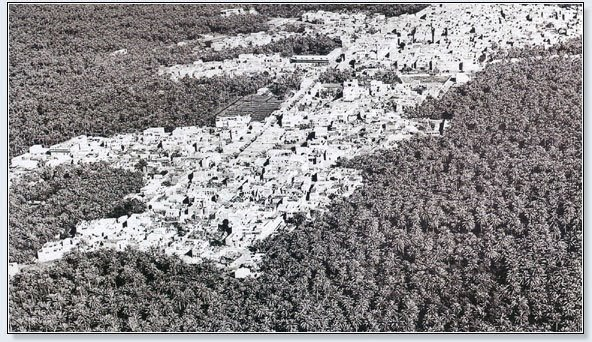
The attached aerial view illustrates several neighborhoods of Qatif, including Shuwaika, Kuwaikib, Dababiya, among others. The southern portion of Qatif Castle is visible at the top of the image. This photograph was taken in 1955.

The structure is a modest fortress located within the confines of Qatif Castle, surrounded by its own wall. Positioned in the northeast corner, it features two gates: one on the east, accessible from the street outside the wall, and another on the south, serving as the exit for individuals within the fortress. During the Ottoman period, the fortress functioned as a defensive structure. Subsequently, it was repurposed as a Wireless transmission station for sending and receiving telegrams and as a post office during the Saudi era. Government departments were established within the fortress to accommodate telegraph and postal employees, as well as housing for the director of the wireless station. The first director was Hussein Nass, a Hijazi who lived in Qatif for an extended period.

==== The open spaces ( Barahat ) ====
The open spaces in front of the houses in Qatif Castle served as gathering places for children, who engaged in social activities and popular games such as Taila, Yahmouh, Khast, Andi, among others.

One of the most notable courtyards in Qatif Castle is Al-Jami'ah, a medium-sized square located in the Khan neighborhood. This area hosts a market where women sell a variety of dairy products and fruits, including rutabaga, khalal, basil, raziqi, foul, and chicken eggs. The market operates daily from early morning until noon.

Additionally, the Milk Baraha, located in the Khan neighborhood, functions as a market every afternoon during the month of Ramadan. It is one of the most popular markets, attracting a high volume of sellers and buyers. A wide range of food items, including grains, poultry, milk, and eggs, are available for purchase. The Horse Baraha is situated between the Sidra and Al-Warsh neighborhoods.

=== Wells ===
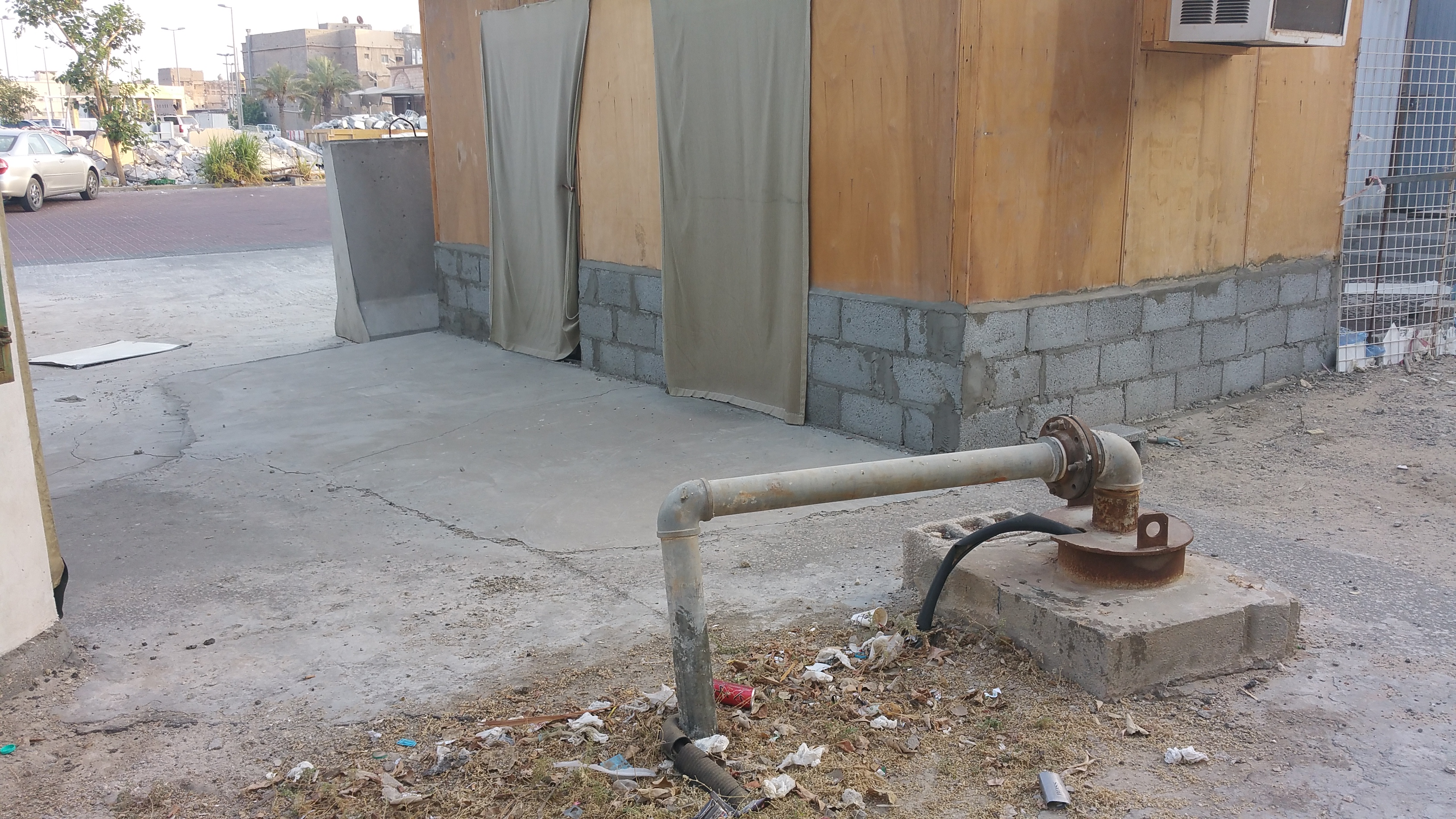
An image of one of the wells of Qatif Castle, depicting its current state following the removal of the water.

The castle experienced flooding from groundwater, which necessitated the construction of wells in the vicinity of the houses, including:

- Khan's Well is located at the end of a rectangular plot of land, featuring an open entrance from the west and another entrance from the south. The well is supported by four columns, which are interconnected by open bridges at the top and sides. Due to its cleanliness, abundance, and proximity, Khan's Well is frequently crowded with housewives during the day and early evening until the time of the evening prayer.
- Jabla's Well is a public facility located in the Sidra neighborhood, providing brackish water intended solely for drinking purposes. The practice of washing utensils and brushes in the well is prohibited to maintain its cleanliness. The water is supplied by shipowners, ensuring its exceptional quality and freshness.
- Mughibuh Well features a roofed basin and is considered one of the most esteemed sources of water for the residents of Qatif Castle. Located in a corner of one of the swabs, the well's water source is largely concealed due to its darkness and the distance from the edge of the surface.
- Baraha Al-Khail Well is an open and shallow well situated in the Al-Warsh neighborhood. It is primarily used for washing purposes.

In addition to the wells, Qatif Castle benefited from the flow of water from several springs. One notable spring is located in the Al-Warsh neighborhood, where water flows to irrigate the surrounding palm trees. The water from this spring flows northwards, ultimately discharging into the sea. A canal has been constructed to channel the water from this spring to the pool of the Emirate Mosque in the east, and then further to the sea.

=== Residential houses ===
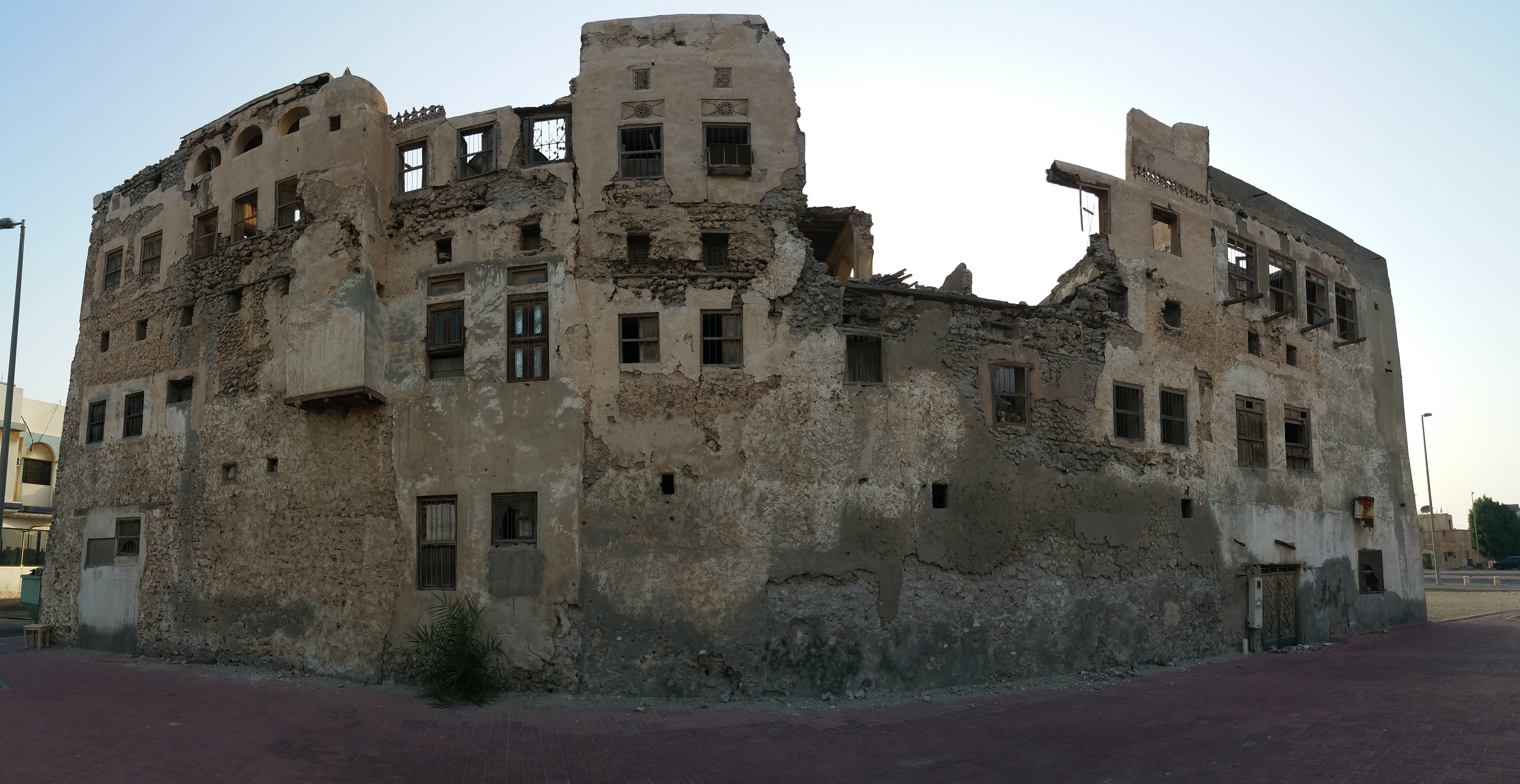

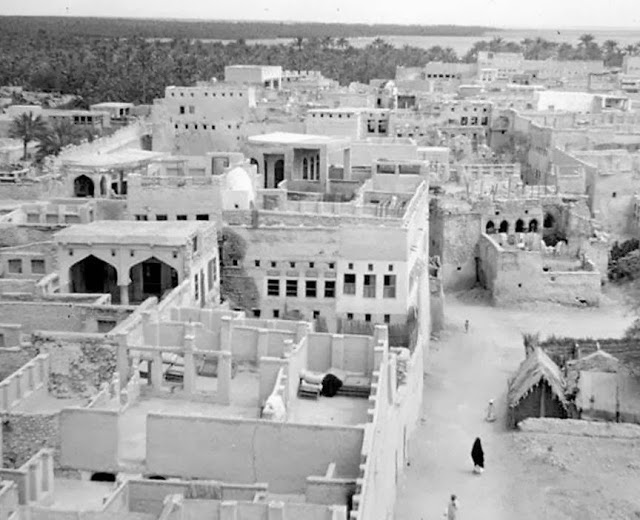
The houses of Qatif Castle are located amidst lush palm trees, with a vast ocean extending beyond the horizon. This photograph was taken from within the confines of Qatif Castle, although the exact date of capture remains uncertain.

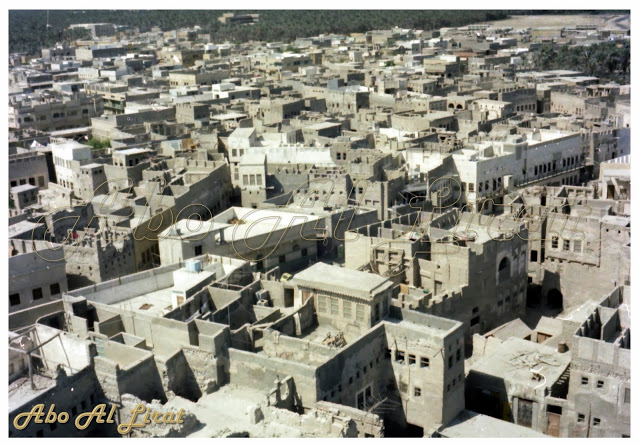
The attached images depict the neighborhoods and houses of Qatif Castle prior to their removal. Notably, some roofs remain unroofed, a local practice known as A'arsh.

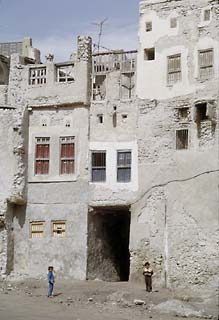
The image shows two houses within Qatif Castle, each consisting of three floors with a corridor between them and a basement underneath. The photograph was taken in 1975.

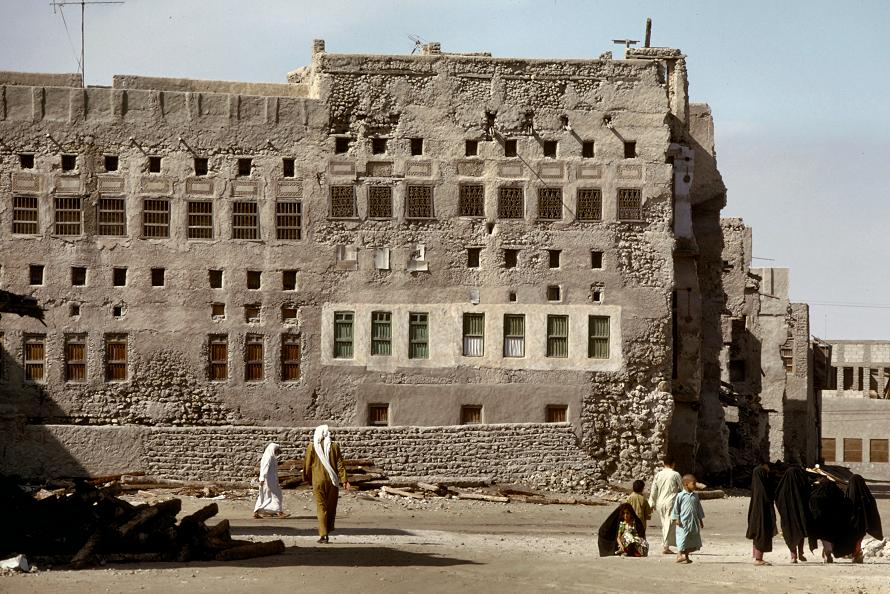
This photograph, taken in 1975, depicts one of the larger houses in Qatif Castle, with residents walking around it.

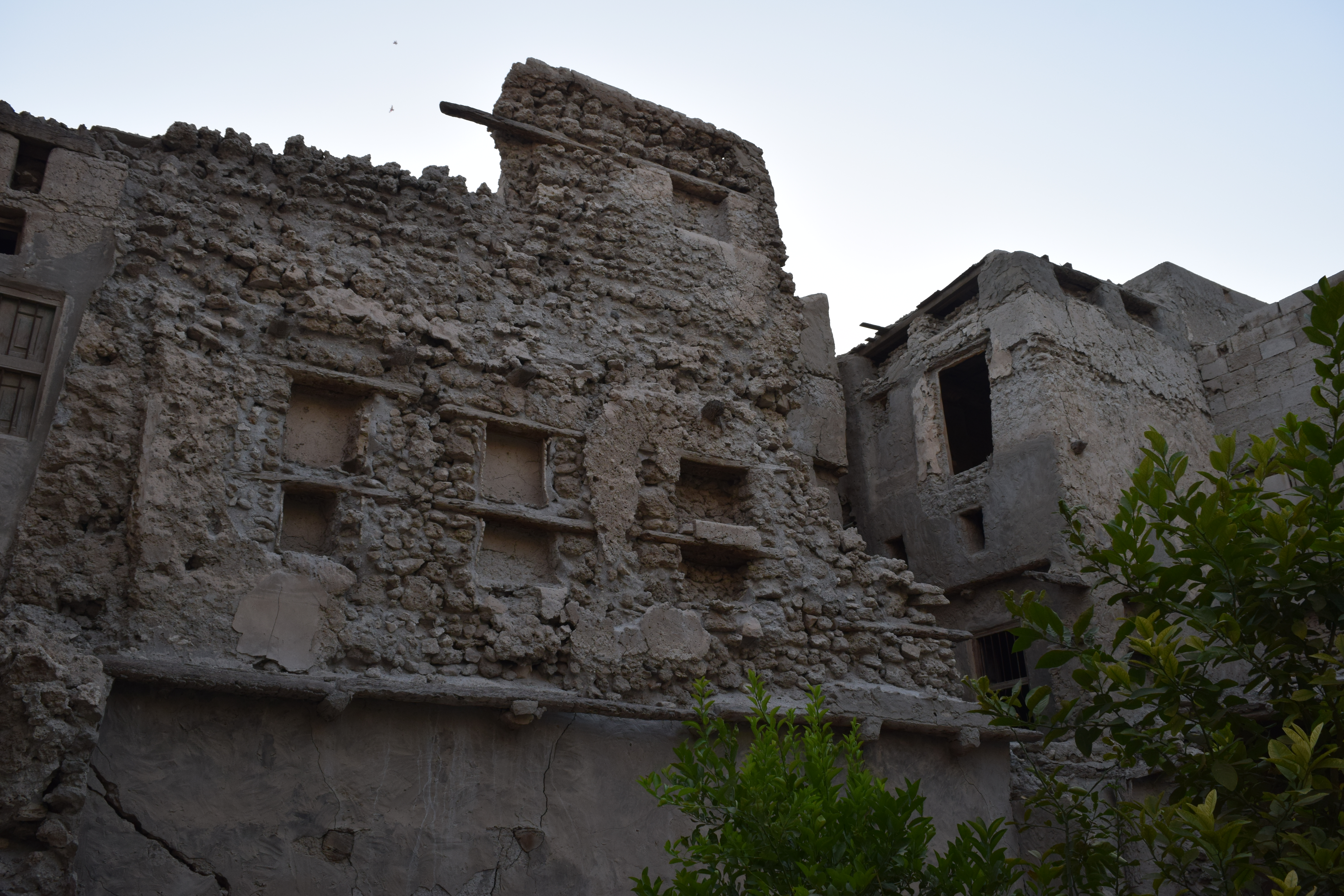
The attached image, taken on 8 July 2017, depicts the side of a house in the Zurayb neighborhood. It illustrates the architectural features that reflect the building's connection to adjacent houses, which were demolished prior to the photograph being taken.

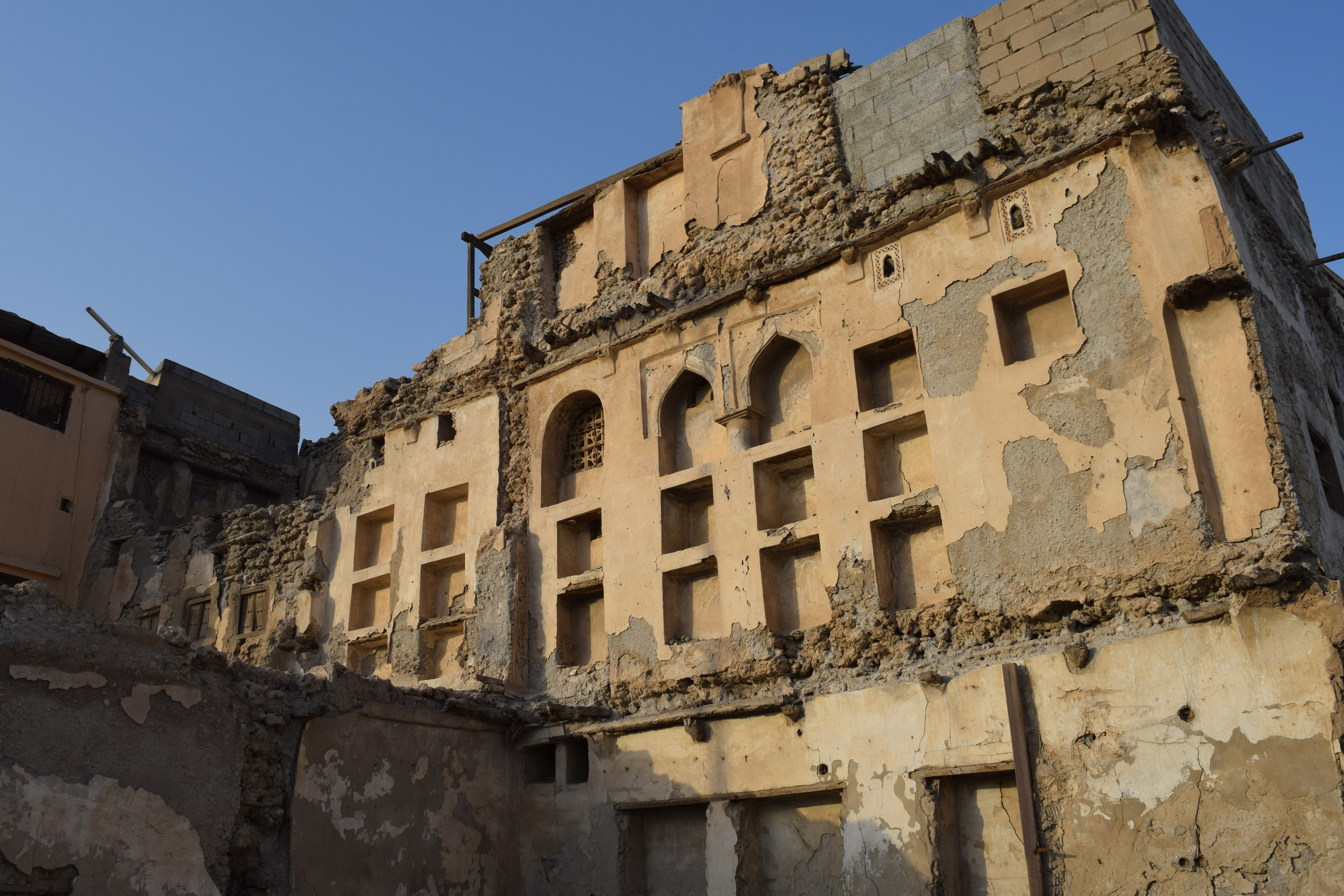
This image depicts one of the houses at Qatif Castle, taken on 8 July 2017.

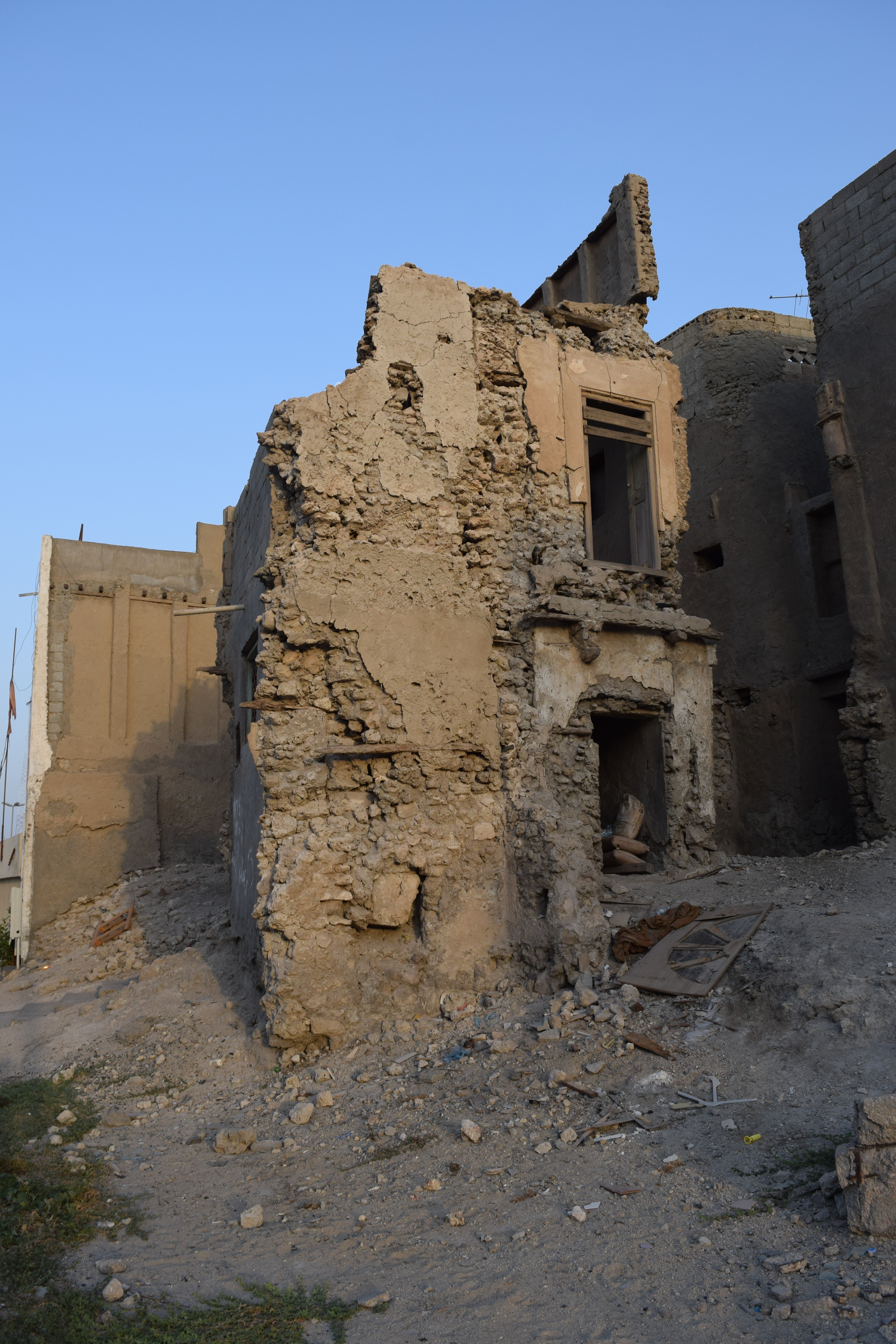
The attached image, taken on 8 July 2017, shows a property along with the mowing and demolition of nearby houses.

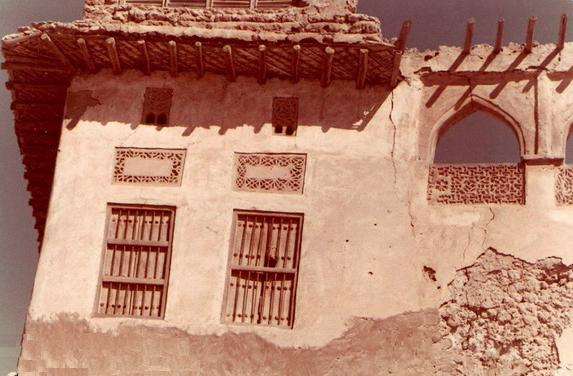
A house at Qatif Castle is prominently visible, showcasing its remarkable architectural features and intricate decorations.

The houses within the neighborhoods of the Qatif Castle citadel were constructed using sea stones and plaster. Their design followed an architectural concept known as savat, which involves paving a layer of cement, adding a stone layer, and dividing the wall into solid and hollow sections, sealed with a rabat. The average size of these houses was approximately 200 square meters. Most houses were monolithic and interconnected, facilitating the construction of additional rooms above them using wide swabs or zaranik.

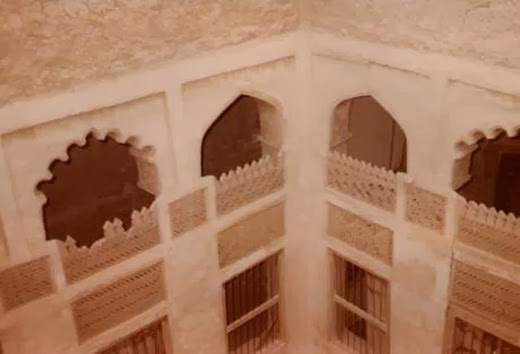
The inner courtyard of Al-Giashi's House is centrally located, serving as a connection between the apartments surrounding the main building.

The stones used, known as sabat, were noted for their diversity and were often formed into decorative arches. For roofing, palm trunks were commonly utilized, while more luxurious council buildings featured roofs made from gondola wood. Other materials such as carpentry logs, pagel, and jarid were also employed in roof construction. The roofs were then covered with bargils and mats, followed by additional roofing materials to enhance durability.

Some houses within Qatif Castle feature a roofed and sealed underground stream that facilitates the direct drainage of wastewater from the home to the sea. Inhabitants relied on candles and lanterns for illumination, utilizing fuels derived from palm materials, including fronds, carp, petals, and fibers.

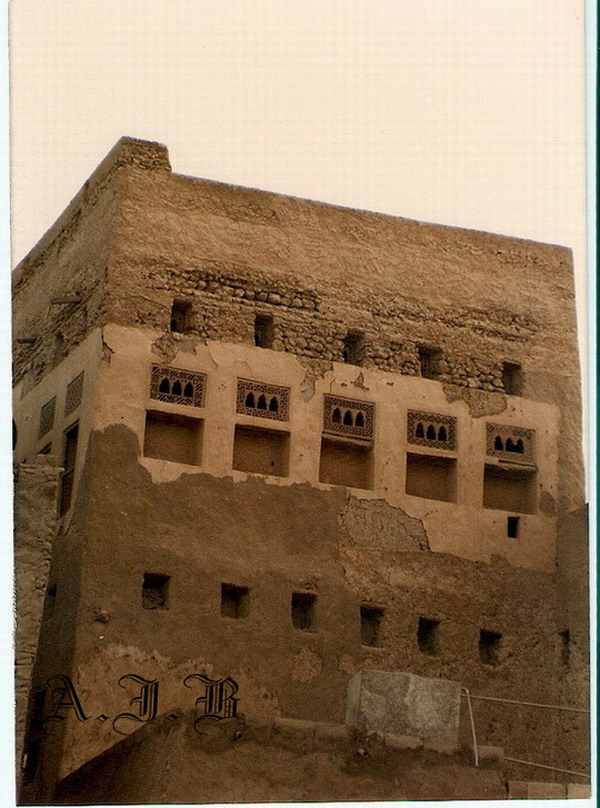
Castle houses

Ventilation systems were minimal, consisting primarily of hand fans made from palm fronds. As a result, the houses were constructed with thick plaster walls and wide foundations, often reaching up to half a meter in thickness, to maintain cooler temperatures during the hot summer months.

Qatif Castle was initially inhabited by fishermen. Over time, historical events led many residents of Qatif to relocate to the castle, resulting in a gradual increase in population and the construction of houses within its walls. Most of the houses within the castle are three floors.

The ground floor typically houses firewood and date warehouses, along with a designated area for a summer rest house, which often receives limited natural light. The second floor consists of bedrooms, a women's council room, and essential home services, including a kitchen. Additionally, this level contains storage areas, a bathroom, and a swimming pool, which was frequently used for storing large quantities of grain, organized in small flats. These flats often feature a wooden structure fixed to the wall, approximately one meter high, upon which the grain, or jahlah (a larger and more expensive type), is placed.

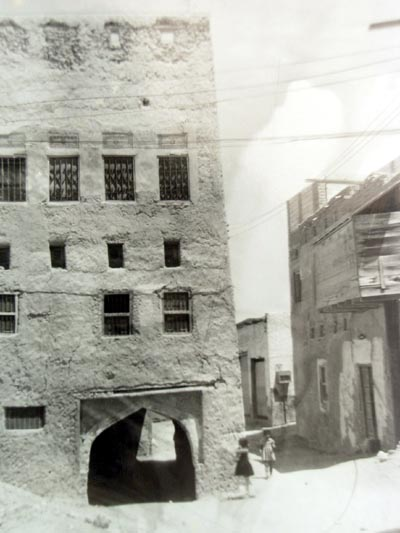
Qatif Castle Houses

The third floor serves as the roof of the house, commonly used for sleeping during the summer months. This roof is often divided into open-air rooms known as arish, furnished with beds, cots, and locks made from palm leaves. Sometimes, the roof includes one or two enclosed rooms referred to as khalwa. The windows of these houses are generally oriented to the east and south to facilitate airflow, providing a cool and comfortable living environment due to the elevation and limited wind exposure.

Qatif Castle is characterized by its three-storey residences, primarily owned by merchants and affluent individuals, who elevated the grandeur of their homes. These residences featured walls embellished with intricate arches and stucco decorations, opulent furnishings, and a variety of valuable ornaments. Notably, some houses included staircases made of smooth marble, while the bedrooms were furnished with high-quality wood imported from India and Africa.

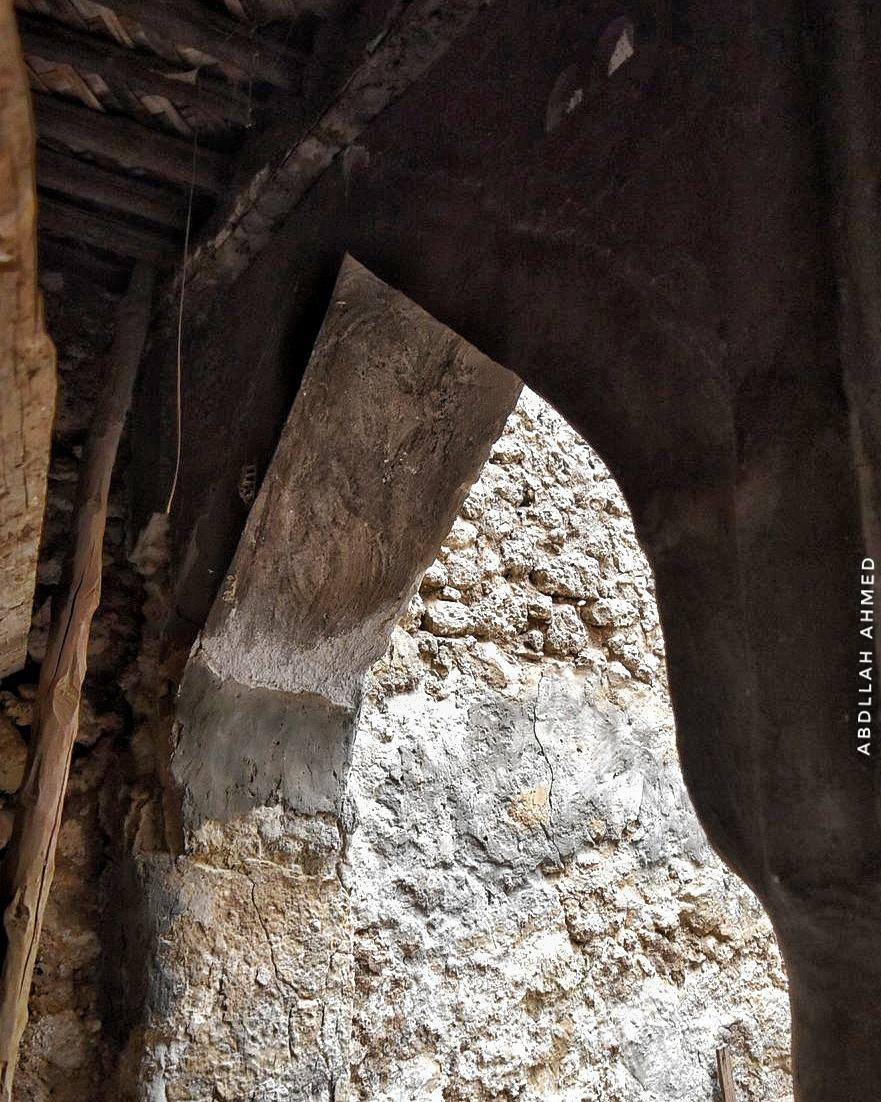
Qatif Castle Houses

Chests within these homes were crafted from teak or nabak wood, often inlaid with silver and intricately carved. Some chests were further embellished with elephant ivory and contained trays filled with antiques, jugs of rose water, and amber vials. The illumination of these properties was achieved through various lighting solutions, including lamps, lanterns, and candles. The construction of these houses was carried out by the residents of Qatif, Tarut, and Awamiya, with notable figures such as Ali bin Habib al-Ghanim contributing to the efforts.

In front of the castle, limestone and palm trunks were gathered in piles for burning, plastering, and painting purposes. The photograph of this scene is estimated to date back to 1924 AD. The stone shown in the foreground is a sample of the material used in the castle's construction, specifically a marine mudstone known as furosh stone.

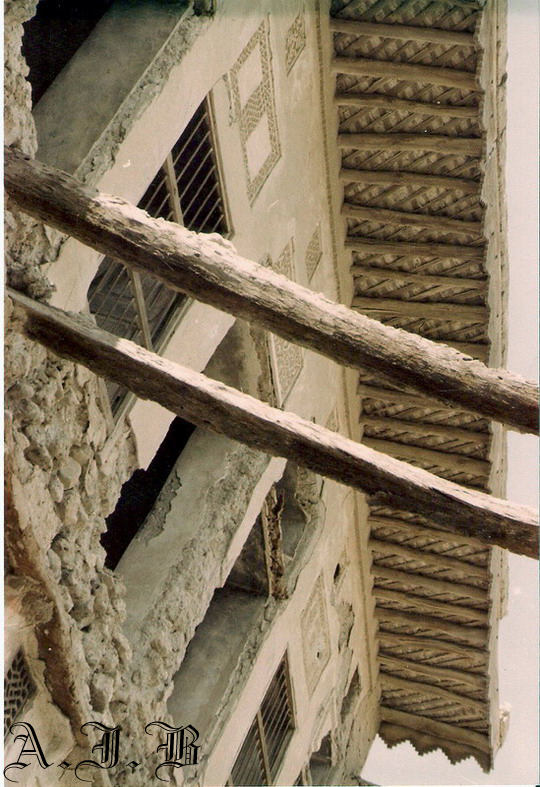
Qatif Castle Houses

Additionally, a variety of jugs and utensils were utilized within the castle, with local residents referring to them by various names. Items such as khwan, safra, and jaraba were suspended on the walls of courtyards, crafted from palm wicker for storing cores and fish bones throughout the week. These materials were collected and sold every Thursday.

In addition to the aforementioned items, several other utensils are utilized indoors, including:

- A large samawer is a utensil that measures approximately half a meter in diameter and 1.2 meters in height, including its seat. It is commonly placed in the bathroom of the bedroom and is used to heat water for bathing purposes.
- A small samower is a utensil specifically designed for brewing tea.
- The Belala is a thing made from three or four pieces of wood, fastened together with nails to form a triangular or square shape. It is suspended from the ceiling of a nave using a rope, positioned at an accessible height for individuals. The primary purpose of the lebla is to deter cats and insects from accessing meat cages or small eating pots.
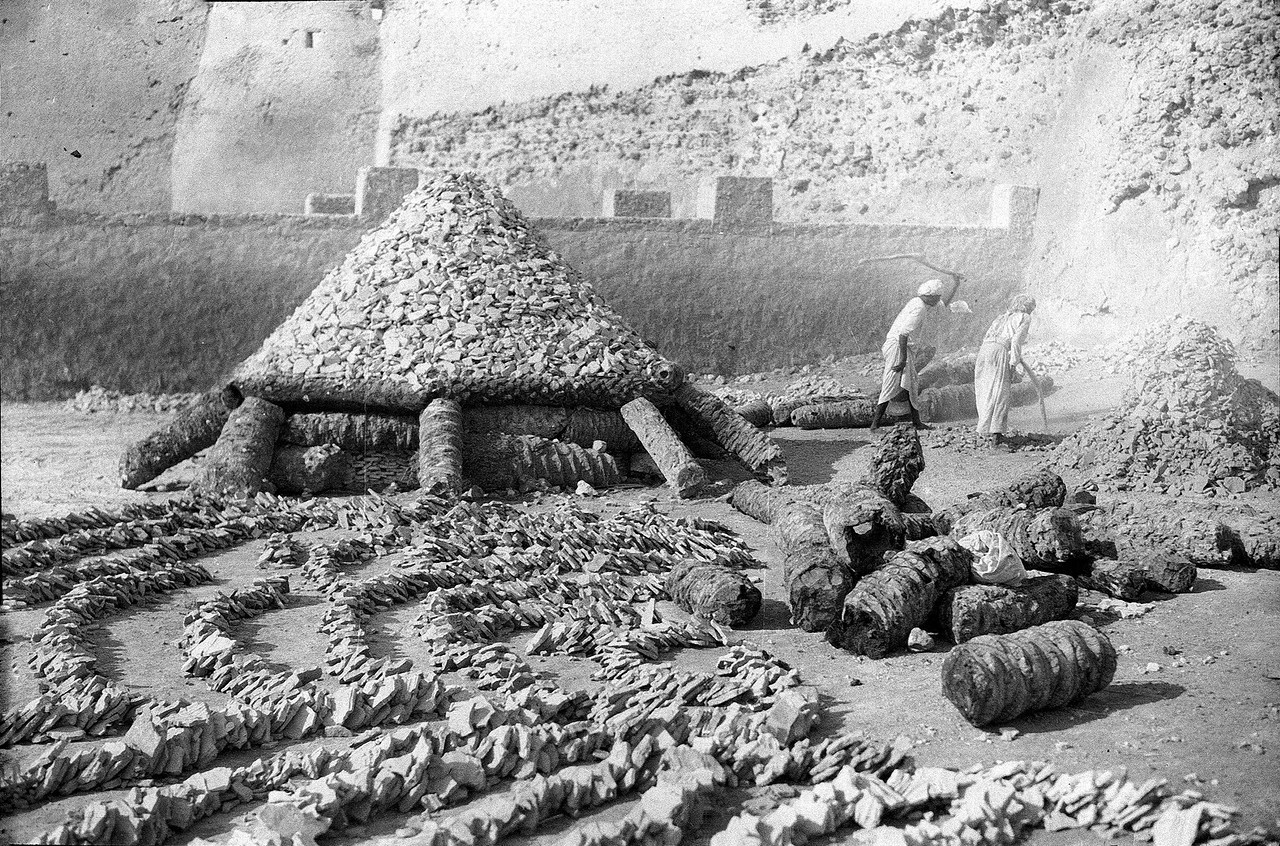
- Gathering limestone to be burned along with palm trunks, which will be used for plastering and painting. The estimated date of the photograph is 1924.
  Mal Mali, also known as a malg, is a white cloth designed to collect rainwater for drinking purposes. Typically square in shape, it can also be found in a rectangular form, measuring approximately 3 meters in length and 1.5 meters in width. The malj is suspended from the roof, secured at each of its four corners with strong thread to ensure it hangs centrally. At its center, a heavy, clean chamber with sloping sides and a solid base is positioned to facilitate water collection. The Qarabiya is a large pot used for collecting and storing rainwater, often covered with a wicker or burlap wrap to prevent breakage. The plural of Qarabiya is Qarabiyat.

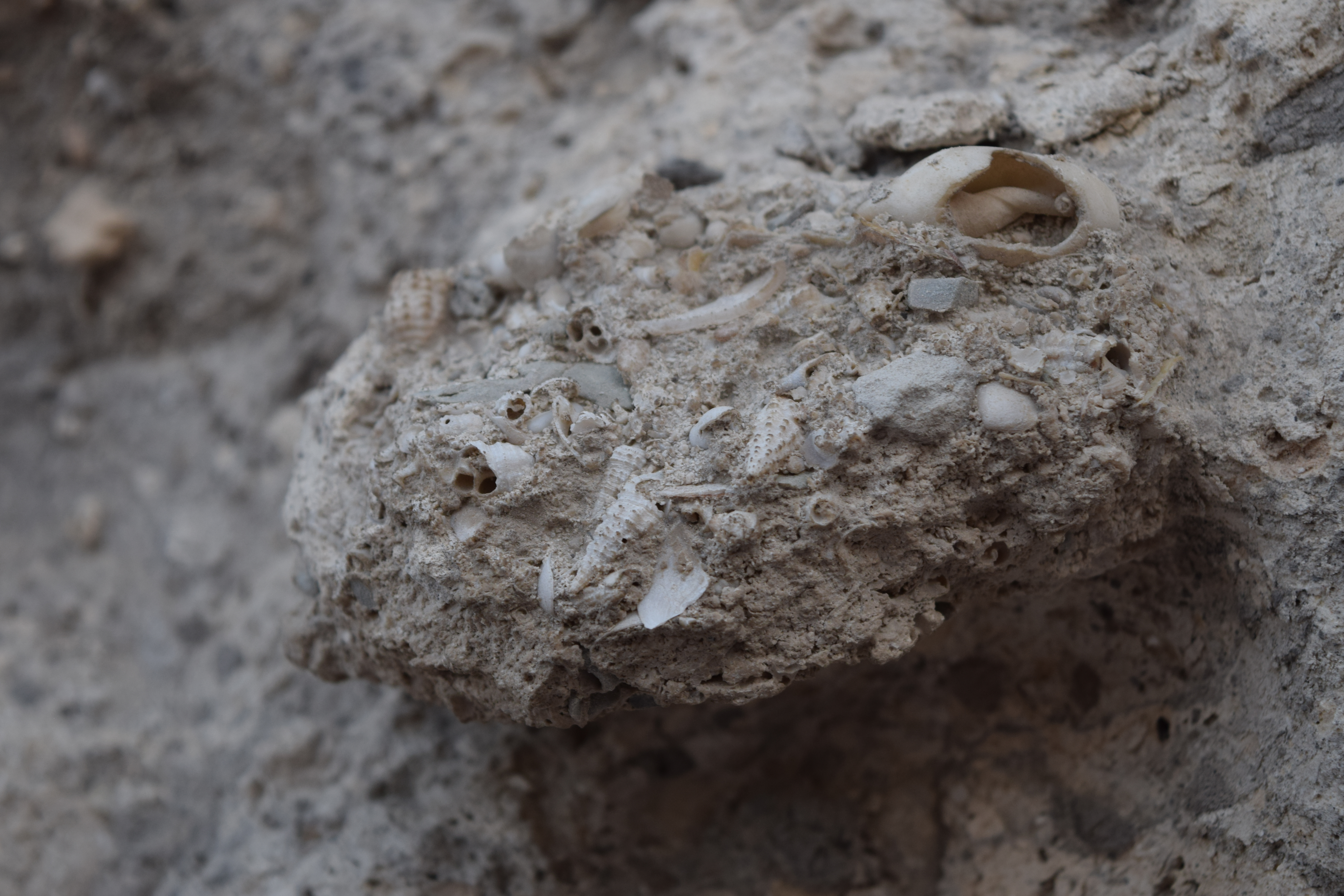
The stone from which the castle was constructed is a marine clay stone, known as furosh stone.

he accommodation within the castle was characterized by shared houses occupied by extended families. However, traditional housing types have seen a decline due to improvements in housing quality and the rapid rise of modern architectural styles. Many old buildings have been demolished and replaced with contemporary structures. Despite this, remnants of the old buildings still exist, although in limited numbers, and most of them are uninhabited.

It is believed that the survival of these remaining houses can be attributed to the use of plaster material in their construction, which has proven resistant to erosion factors. This traditional building style persisted until the early 1970s, ultimately giving way to modern designs with the introduction of the Real Estate Development Fund, leading to a widespread abandonment of what was known as Arabic architecture.

=== Al Gashi's house ===
Al Gashi's house, also known as Beit Al-Gashi, built over four centuries ago, this five-storey residence was originally home to multiple families, each occupying a separate section. The apartments are arranged around a spacious open courtyard at the center of the house. Residents continued to inhabit Beit Al-Gashi until the early 21st century.

=== Customs and traditions ===
The tradition of firing the Iftar cannon during Ramadan was a common practice in Qalaa. On the nights of mid-Sha'ban and the last day of Sha'ban, locally known as Qurash Day, a daily Ramadan market was held in Baraha, at the heart of the Qatif neighborhood. Residents from the suburbs would come to the market, bringing a variety of fresh produce, including seasonal vegetables, fruits, dairy products, and eggs. After the afternoon, customers would purchase their necessities and engage with children and young adults, culminating in the conclusion of Ramadan.

== History ==
The modern city of Qatif is situated on the site of an ancient city that historians trace back to over 3,000 B.C. The monuments and ruins found in this area attest to its historical significance, indicating that the modern city of Qatif has expanded considerably compared to the ancient city (the Citadel), which comprised a compact neighborhood characterized by adjacent buildings and narrow streets. Established by the Sassanids, Qatif Castle initially served as a military base for defense. It was later utilized by the Ottomans as a garrison and, at one point, as a warehouse for goods and a storehouse for spices and perfumes arriving from Tarut Island due to its strategic location and direct access to the market. Eventually, the castle transitioned into a residential area and became the heart of the Qatif metropolis.

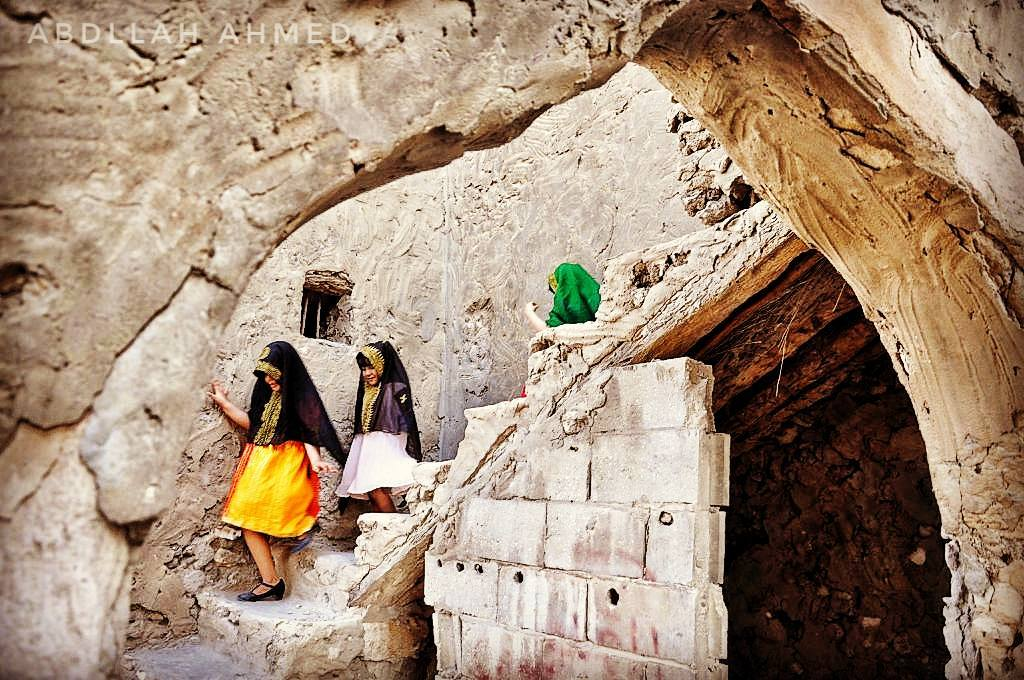
The photograph depicts children dressed in traditional costumes during the Krikshun celebration in the Al-Qalaa neighborhoods. It was taken recently.

=== Sasanian state ===
Tracing back to the third century AD during the Sassanid era. It was originally established on the ruins of the city of Khatt, which Ardashir bin Babak founded in the early third century AD. Historical figures such as Yaqut al-Hamawi and al-Tabari confirm that the region of al-Farda was inhabited by the Banu Amer bin al-Harith bin Abd al-Qays tribe. Al-Tabari further notes that Ardashir bin Babak (226-241 AD), the founder of the Sasanian state, constructed a city at this site, leading to the belief that he built Khatt as one of several cities intended for military purposes.

Qatif Castle served as a fortress and military base due to its strategic coastal location. This military approach was mirrored by the Portuguese during their colonization of the region, as evidenced by their coastal garrisons, such as Tarut Castle. The names associated with the area prior to its demolition also imply that the city was effectively synonymous with the castle itself. After the old city of Qatif, situated further inland, was destroyed by a storm, its inhabitants migrated to the site of Qatif Castle, known as Mahallat al-Sayyadin. They constructed the castle and marked their migration with the word "Hijra," which means "camel," first used in 216 AH. Following the destruction of Zara in 283 AH by Abu Said al-Hasan bin Bahram al-Janabi, the population concentrated in Hijra.

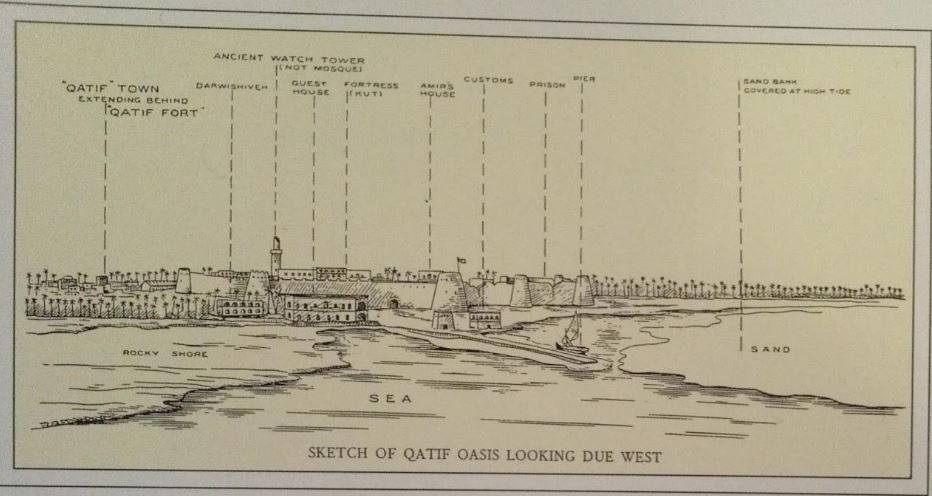
The castle from the seaward side as seen in a Portuguese-era painting.

=== Uyunid Emirate ===
During the peak of the Uyuni state's prosperity, several of the Uyuni emirs designated Qatif as their seat of rule. Their emirate residence was situated to the north of the castle.

=== Ottoman Empire ===
Inscriptions on a stone plaque at the Darwaza of Bab al-Shamal indicate that it was rebuilt by Ali Pasha during the reign of Ottoman Sultan Selim II in 1039 AH, following the Portuguese withdrawal from the area. The date on the plaque is written in the form of camel calculation, preserving a key word. It is also believed that this stone plaque served as the foundation stone laid by Sultan Selim II for the reconstruction of the citadel. A similar stone plaque, found at the entrance to the minaret of the Sidra Mosque, bears an inscription marking the construction date of the mosque, which dates back to the eighth century AH.

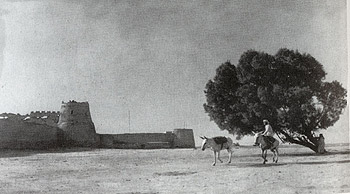
Part of the Qatif Customs fortresses, photo from 1947.

=== First Saudi State ===
In Jumada I of 1206 AH (January 1792 AD), the First Saudi State gained control of Qatif following a military campaign led by Prince Saud bin Abdulaziz. The assault began with an attack on the town of Sehat, resulting in the deaths of approximately 1,500 residents and the seizure of wealth. Historian Ibn Ghannam documented that the financial gains were substantial. Prince Saud then advanced to Anak, where 500 men were killed, and their assets were confiscated. His campaign continued to Al-Qudaih, where further casualties occurred, and property was seized.

Following these events, Prince Saud laid siege to Qatif Castle, which had become a refuge for many inhabitants. A reconciliation was reached with the residents, who agreed to pay a ransom of 3,000 gold coins, equivalent to 5,000 silver coins or 500 gold liras. According to historian Ibn Bashir, during Prince Saud's rule, idols, temples, and churches in Qatif were destroyed, and a significant number of books were collected and burned.

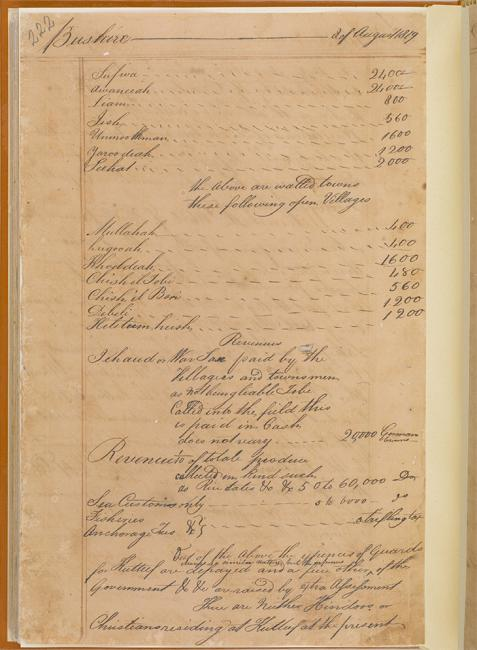
An excerpt from one of George Sadlier's letters listing cities and their inhabitants in the Al-Ahsa region, dated July 17, 1819.

=== Second Saudi State ===
In June 1819, European traveler George Forster Sadlier documented a comprehensive account of Qatif Castle, which had been established the previous year by Turki bin Abdullah Al Saud during the period of the Second Saudi State. Sadlier's memoirs provided a detailed description of the castle, the agricultural products cultivated in the surrounding region, the markets located nearby, the prevailing commercial conditions, and an estimate of the local population and the taxes remitted to the Ottoman Empire.

George Forster Sadlier estimated the population of Qatif Castle to be approximately 4,000. He noted the absence of Hindus or Christians within the population and provided a detailed outline of the taxes imposed on the castle's inhabitants, which he presented in a table included in his memoirs.

Following the death of Imam Faisal bin Turki Al Saud (circa 1282 AH), a significant division emerged among his sons concerning the distribution of power, resulting in the country splitting into two distinct factions. One faction, led by Abdullah bin Faisal Al Saud, was based in Riyadh, while the other, under the control of Saud bin Faisal Al Saud, operated in Al-Ahsa and Qatif. This division led to numerous conflicts between the sons of Imam Faisal. In response, Prince Abdullah bin Faisal Al Saud sought assistance from the governor of Baghdad, Ahmed Medhat Pasha. In 128 AH, Pasha dispatched a substantial land and naval force from Basra, supported by Sheikh Abdullah Al Sabah, the governor of Kuwait. This combined force successfully conquered all the villages in Qatif, including Qatif Castle. This campaign is documented in a report issued on 26 May 1871 AD by General Mohammed Nafez Pasha, the Ottoman campaign leader.

In 1249 AH, the rulers of Bahrain, the Al Khalifa family, launched a naval campaign aimed at annexing Qatif to Bahrain. They began their offensive in Darien and secured control of the territory, eventually asserting dominance over the entire island of Tarut. In response, Abdullah Al-Ghanim organized ships to repel the Al Khalifa's attack and instructed the people of Seyhat to prepare for confrontation. Despite agreeing to meet on a specific day, Al-Ghanim's fleet was delayed by one day, causing him to miss the agreed-upon rendezvous with the Seyhat forces. Consequently, the people of Seyhat faced the enemy alone, suffering significant losses. Believing they had been intentionally abandoned by Al-Ghanim, they sought revenge.

An armed group stormed Qatif Castle, captured Abdullah Al-Ghanim, and transported him to Seyhat, where he was killed. Fearing repercussions, the people of Seyhat wrote to the Al Khalifa, offering to surrender the town. Upon learning of the situation, Prince Turki bin Abdullah Al Saud dispatched an army led by his son, Faisal bin Turki, to restore order and confront the Al Khalifa. A siege ensued at Muraqib, west of Seyhat, and the conflict continued for an extended period. However, during the siege, Faisal bin Turki received news that his cousin, Mishari bin Abdul Rahman, had assassinated his father and seized power in Najd. Faisal withdrew from the siege and returned to Najd. Taking advantage of the internal strife in Najd, Abdullah Al Khalifa attempted to fully occupy Qatif. However, he faced a power struggle within his own family, as some of his sons sought to take control. This internal conflict resulted in a civil war, ultimately leading to the loss of Seyhat and Tarut Island, and preventing him from exerting control over Qatif.

In his account of Qatif Castle, English traveler and historian William Belgrave referenced the observations of fellow traveler George Sadlier, who had visited the city of Qatif. Belgrave described the castle's western gate as a high stone arch of elegant design. He noted that the structure was in a state of disrepair, with crumbling walls and towers flanking both sides. The city of Qatif itself was characterized by a dense population, and two cemeteries were situated in close proximity to the gate.

Belgrave attributed the construction of the castle's walls to the Qarmatians, highlighting their impressive size and strength. The walls were constructed of bricks and rocks, and the castle was fortified with cannons positioned along the walls and gates, some of which faced the sea. The entrance to the castle featured two doors, flanked by towers, and included seating areas for visitors outside.

The castle was located at the far end of the cove, with a square-shaped outer wall and high towers at the corners of the inner wall. A moat surrounded the castle, with the sea providing a natural defense. Additionally, the palace of the governor, responsible for the second Saudi state, was situated at the southwestern end of the castle.

Mr. Belgrave had the opportunity to meet with the emir of Qatif, His Highness Prince Faisal, who was appointed by the Second Saudi State. The emir, named Farhat, was described as a tall black man, approximately fifty years old, who had been raised in Prince Faisal's palace. Belgrave estimated the number of Saudi troops stationed at the castle to be between 250 and 260, observing that the local population of Qatif exhibited hostility towards them.

In his account, Belgrave also provided an architectural overview of the region, noting that many of the houses within the citadel were constructed in the Carthaginian style or had previously been under the control of the Carthaginian state. This influence was particularly evident in the few luxurious houses that remained.

Subsequently, on 2 February 1902, Gaskin visited Qatif aboard the Royal Sphinx, acting on the orders of Colonel Campbell, the deputy political resident in Bushehr.

=== Battle of Al-Sharba ===
In response to the Al-Sharbah incident, the inhabitants of Qatif sought refuge in the Qatif Fortress. On Thursday, the 18th of Jumada Al-Awwal in 1326 AH (corresponding to 18 June 1908 AD), a salesman named Makki bin Haj Ibrahim Al-Dababiyah, hailing from Al-Dababiyah, was approached by a nomadic individual who requested the purchase of a glass of water. After consuming the water, the nomad inquired about the price, to which Al-Dababiyah responded negatively. This exchange escalated into a verbal altercation, followed by a physical confrontation that resulted in injury to one of the parties involved.

Subsequently, Mr. Ibrahim Al-Mashkab arrived with a firearm and discharged a shot, leading to the death of the Bedouin. In retaliation, tribes from Al-Sabih, Mutair, Ajman, Awazim, Mahashir, and other regions mobilized in response to the incident.

The Bedouins initiated a comprehensive siege of Qatif from multiple directions. They arrived in large numbers and established a camp on the western side of Qatif, near the palm groves of Dababiya. From there, they marched toward Qatif with the intention of seeking revenge. At that time, the city of Qatif comprised several areas, including Shuwaika, Dababiya, Al-Kweikb, Al-Shari'a, Mayas, Madaris, Bab Al-Shamal, Al-Jarari, and Qatif Castle.

== The end of the castle and its removal ==
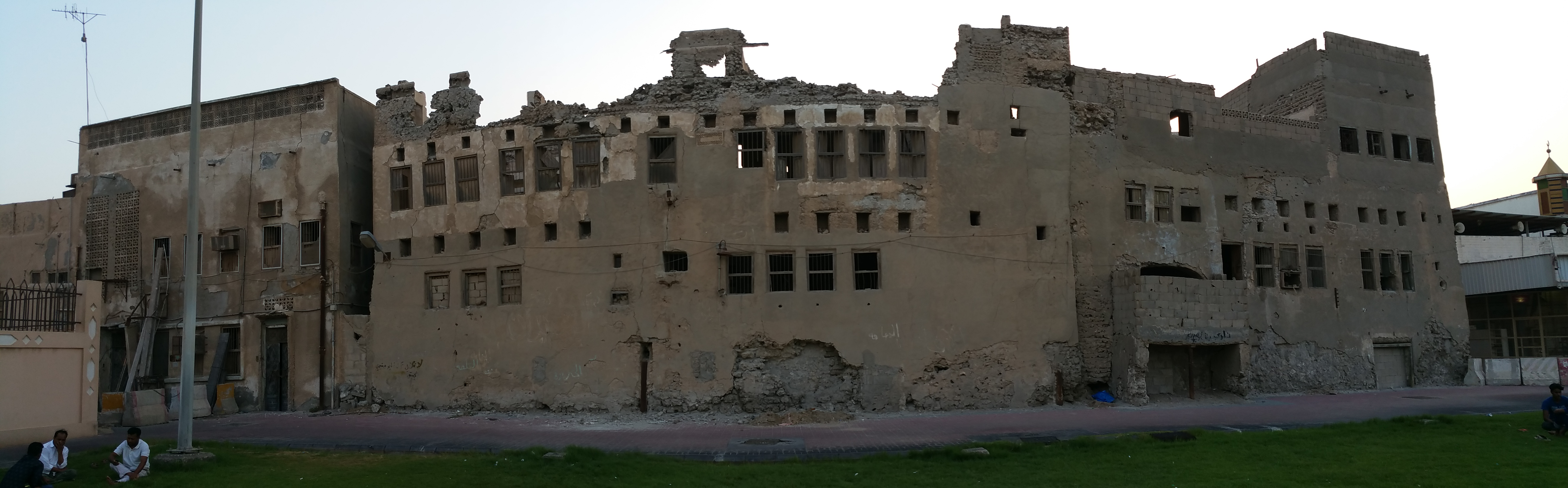

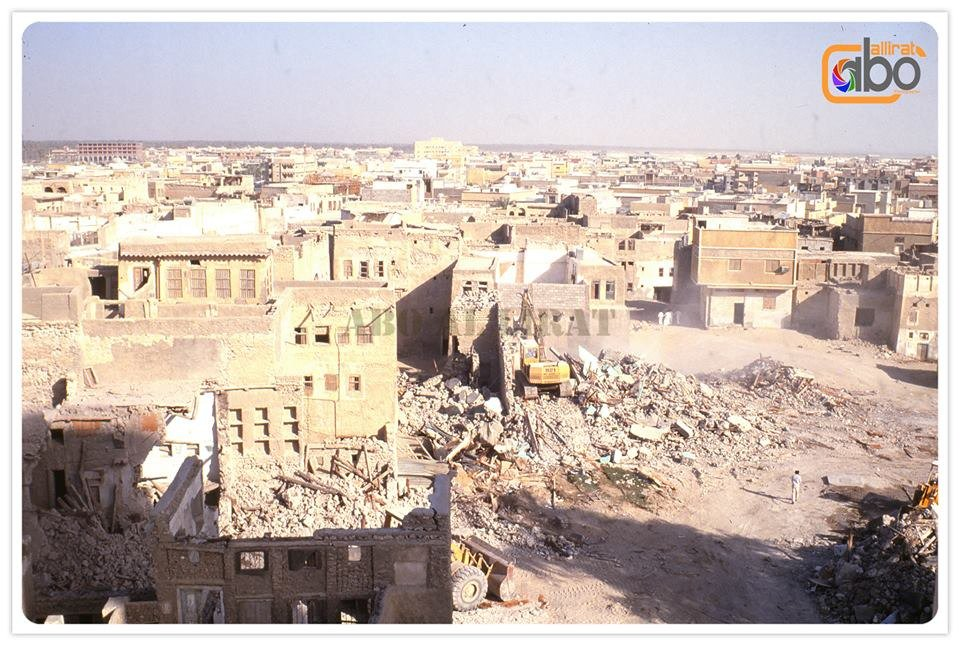
An aerial view of the houses of Qatif Castle during its demolition.

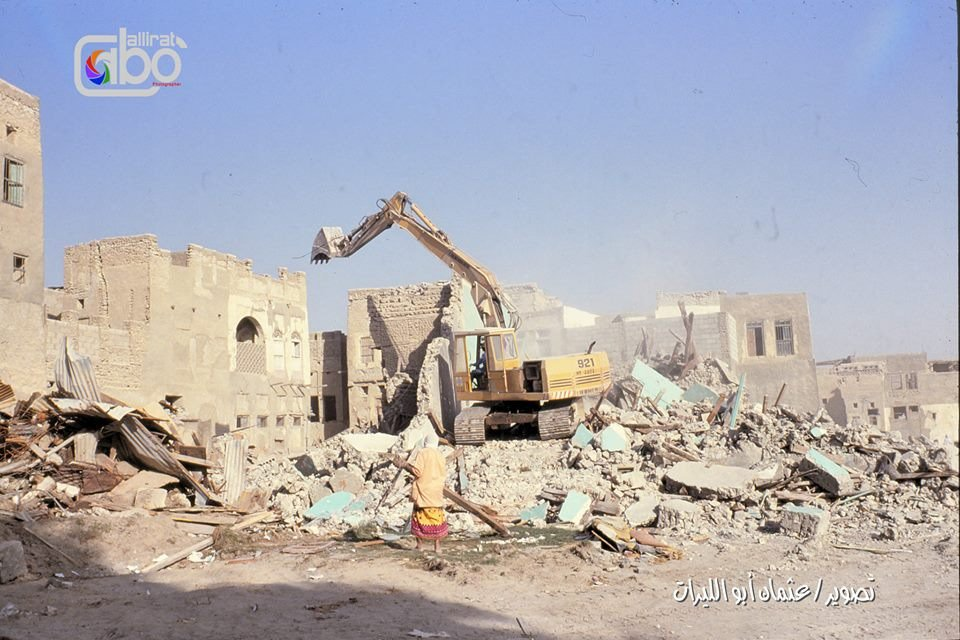
A crane removes the homes of the historic Qatif Castle.

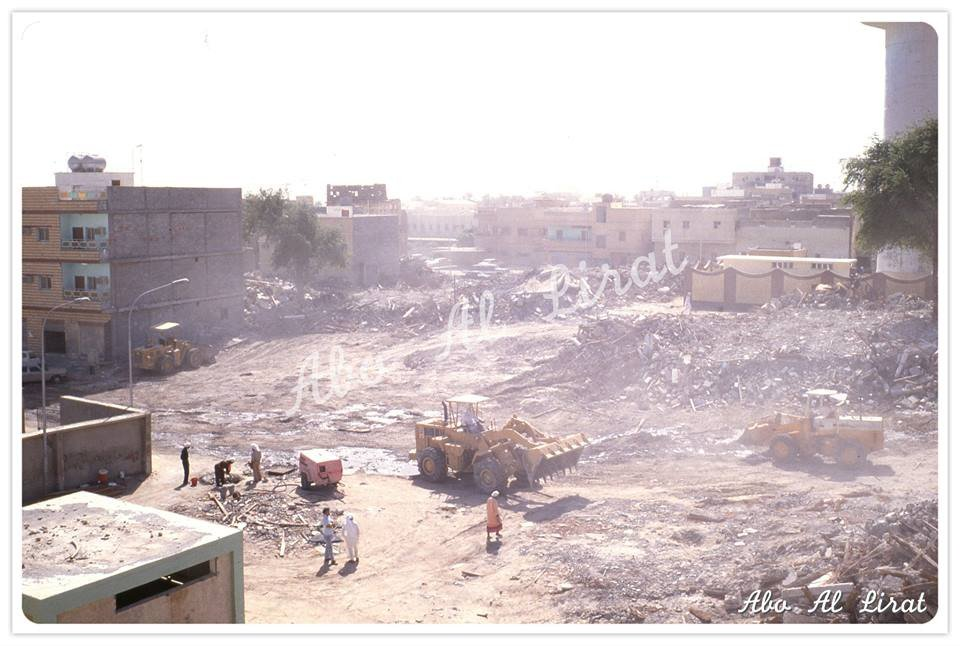
A view of the plaza left after the demolition of a group of houses.

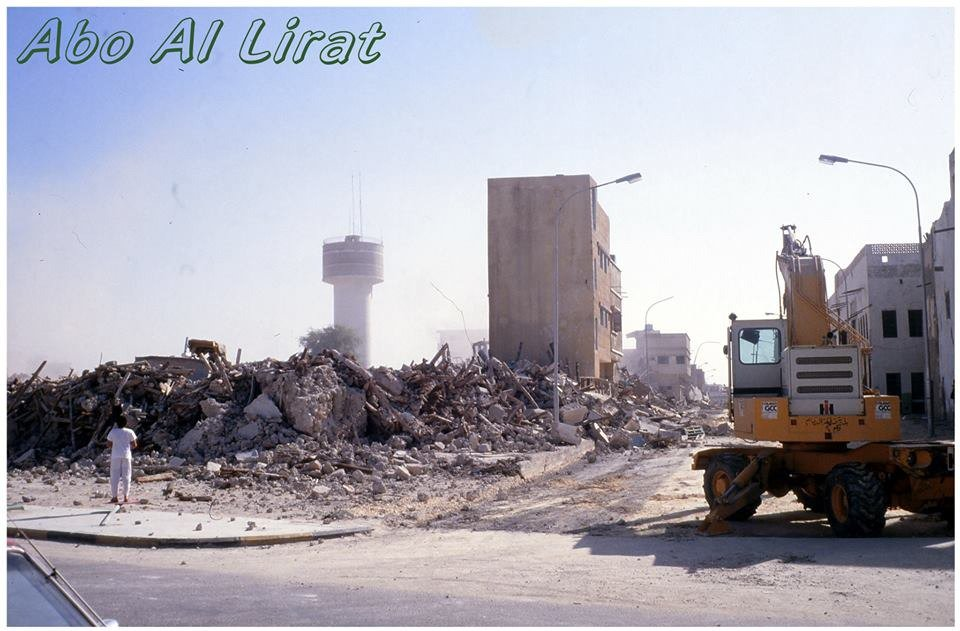
Part of the demolition of the Qatif Castle houses on the street locally known as Al Qas Street.

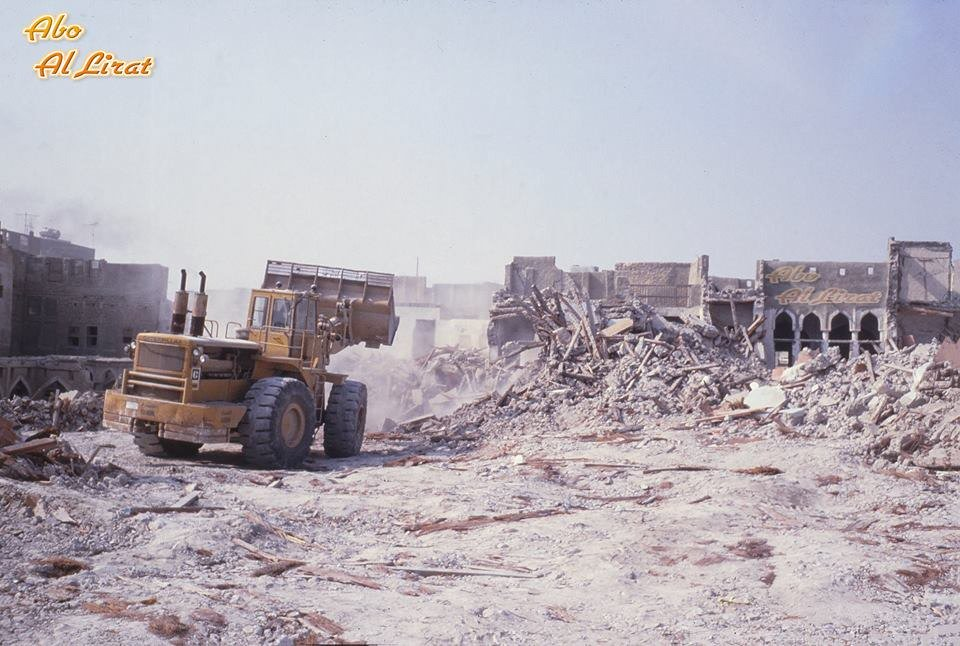
A crane pushes the wreckage of Qatif's castle houses after their removal.

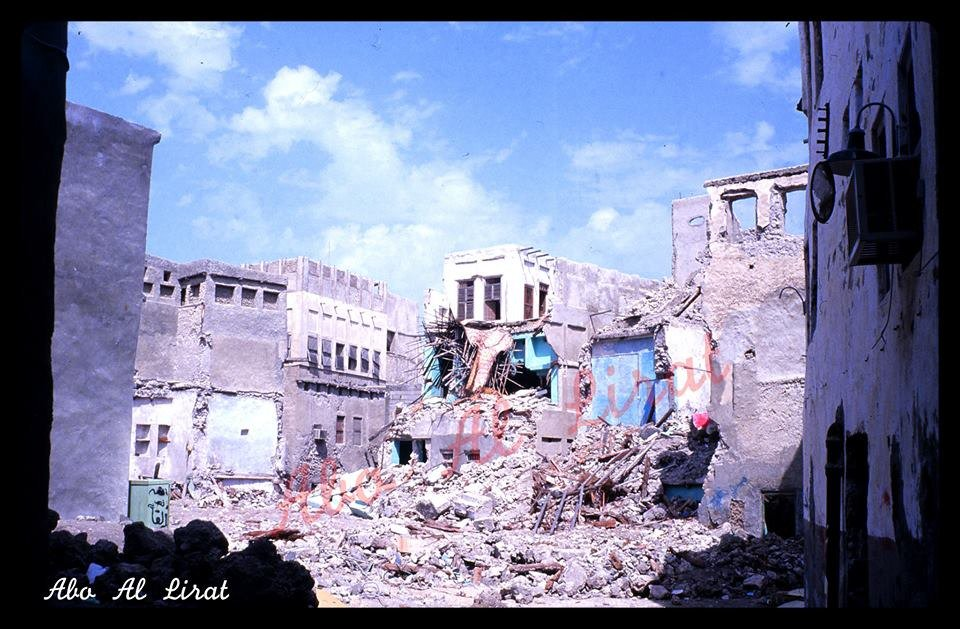
A view from one of the houses of the Qatif Castle demolition.

Following the discovery of oil in Qatif, significant advancements were made in infrastructure, including the installation of electrical wiring, the construction of asphalt roads, and the emergence of urban development around the castle's western entrance, known as the North Gate. In response to these changes, local tribes began to establish permanent residences for protection, forming independent blocks of buildings that later became known as the suburbs of the North Gate. One notable area is Al-Jarari, located between the southwest corner of the castle and the suburb of Al-Kuwaikib, which comprises approximately 300 shops. In addition to the expansion of residential buildings on both sides of the market, urban blocks also developed to the south of it, contributing to the overall growth and modernization of Qatif.

The removal of Qatif Castle was a gradual process that began in the 1970s and concluded in 1985. This process was prompted by the expropriation of the castle from local residents, with most expropriations occurring in 1982. As a result, three neighborhoods—Al-Khan, Al-Warsh, and Al-Sidra—were dismantled. Following the complete removal of the castle, the site was transformed into an undeveloped public space, featuring the construction of parking lots and new buildings. Only 18 houses and the mosques located within them remained intact. The demolition process started with the dismantling of the castle's walls, followed by the mosque and its minaret. Ultimately, the castle itself was demolished, erasing its historical landmarks from the landscape.

Following the demolition of Qatif Castle Al-Qass, the street adjacent to the castle was renamed Al-Qass Street. Following the removal of the castle, the names of some facilities inside and outside the castle also changed. The customs site became the Social Affairs Headquarters, the Emirate Mosque became the Faisal bin Abdulrahman Mosque, the Al-Bahr School is now called Al-Hussein School, and the Emirate is now the headquarters of the Qatif Governorate. The Red Crescent is now the port site.

== The remainder of the castle ==
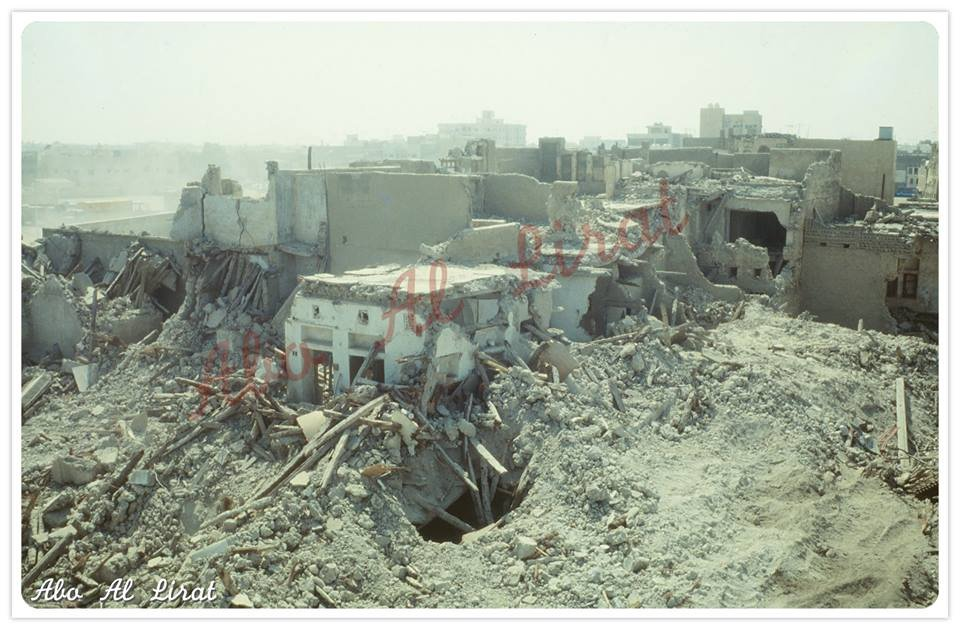

Only eighteen houses remain from Qatif Castle, with several notable properties still standing. Among these are Sheikh Mansour al-Bayat's residence, the home of Mr. Jaafar al-Daalouj located on the main street, and the popular al-Gharab coffee shop in the Al-Sharia neighborhood, along with several mosques and husseiniyas. The current condition of these houses, including those belonging to the Nawahadahs and local merchants, is one of severe disrepair and uninhabitability. In some instances, these houses are occupied by migrant workers, particularly in the Bab Al-Shamal neighborhood, which features numerous heritage buildings.

The area previously occupied by the castle has been redeveloped into a public square, which includes a gate with three towers, parking lots, ten large umbrellas, and approximately 75,000 square meters of green space. Additionally, the square is equipped with 141 lampposts and 542 lighting fixtures, enhancing its functionality and aesthetic appeal.

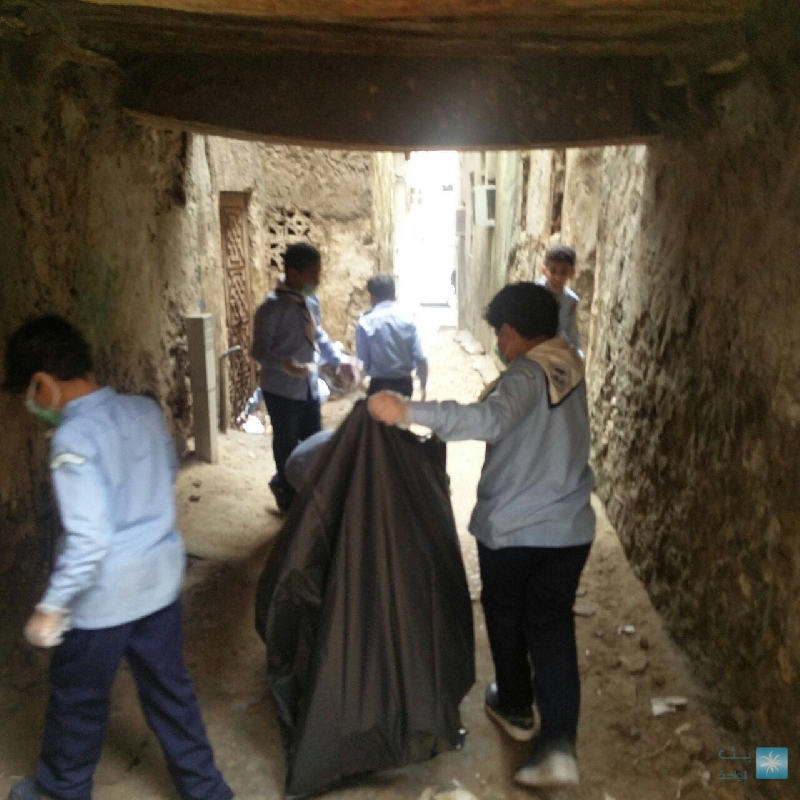
A scouting campaign to remove the rubble of the Zarib neighborhood in Qatif Castle.

== Improvements and development ==
- In June 2014, Engineer Abdul Latif Al-Benyan, the director general of the General Authority for Tourism and National Heritage in the Eastern Province, outlined plans to leverage Qatif's heritage houses through a project focused on heritage towns and preservation. The Authority will select heritage towns based on established criteria for identifying villages and towns, emphasizing the rehabilitation and development of these areas. Notably, the Authority's branch has a particular interest in the heritage towns of Qatif.Al-Benyan explained that the program for tourist villages and towns aims to preserve architectural heritage in the Kingdom's heritage towns and villages, with the goal of fostering investment in the tourism sector.
- In September 2014, a project was initiated to conduct an archaeological survey of the remains of Qatif Castle, establish museums, and restore the perimeters of historical areas. Mr. Jalal Al Haroon, the director of the Urban Heritage Office, confirmed that all heritage areas in the Eastern Province, including Qatif Castle, are officially registered with the General Authority for Tourism and National Heritage. Additionally, he noted that a meeting was held with the municipality of Qatif Governorate to discuss the restoration of the perimeters surrounding heritage and archaeological sites, including those of Qatif Castle. Al Haroon further confirmed that the program is currently in the process of implementation.
- In September 2015, Qatif Municipality announced the re-proposal of a popular café project covering an area of 360 square meters in Qatif's Castle Square for the second time. The objective of this initiative is to create investment opportunities for the private sector. These opportunities will take the form of a Rehabilitation and Education Centre for Food and Public Health Establishment Workers, focusing on construction and operation within Qatif Governorate.
- In February 2017, the Qatif High School Scout Troop conducted a cleanup campaign to remove debris and waste from the Al-Zurayb neighborhood in Al-Qalaa. This initiative was part of the public taste program launched by the Saudi Arabian Scout Association in the Eastern Province. The effort aimed to enhance the cleanliness and aesthetics of the area, promoting community involvement in environmental conservation.

== Cultural associations ==
=== Arts ===
==== 3D model of Qatif Castle ====
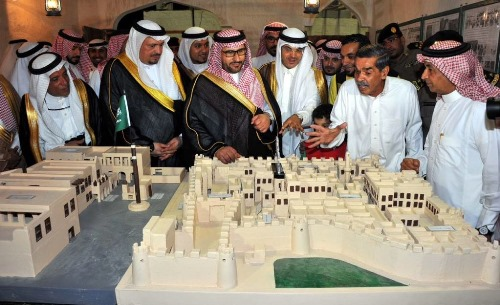
Othman Abu al-Lirat (right) presents a model of the former Qatif Castle to Qatif Governor Khalid al-Sufyan (left), explaining the layout and features of the historic site.

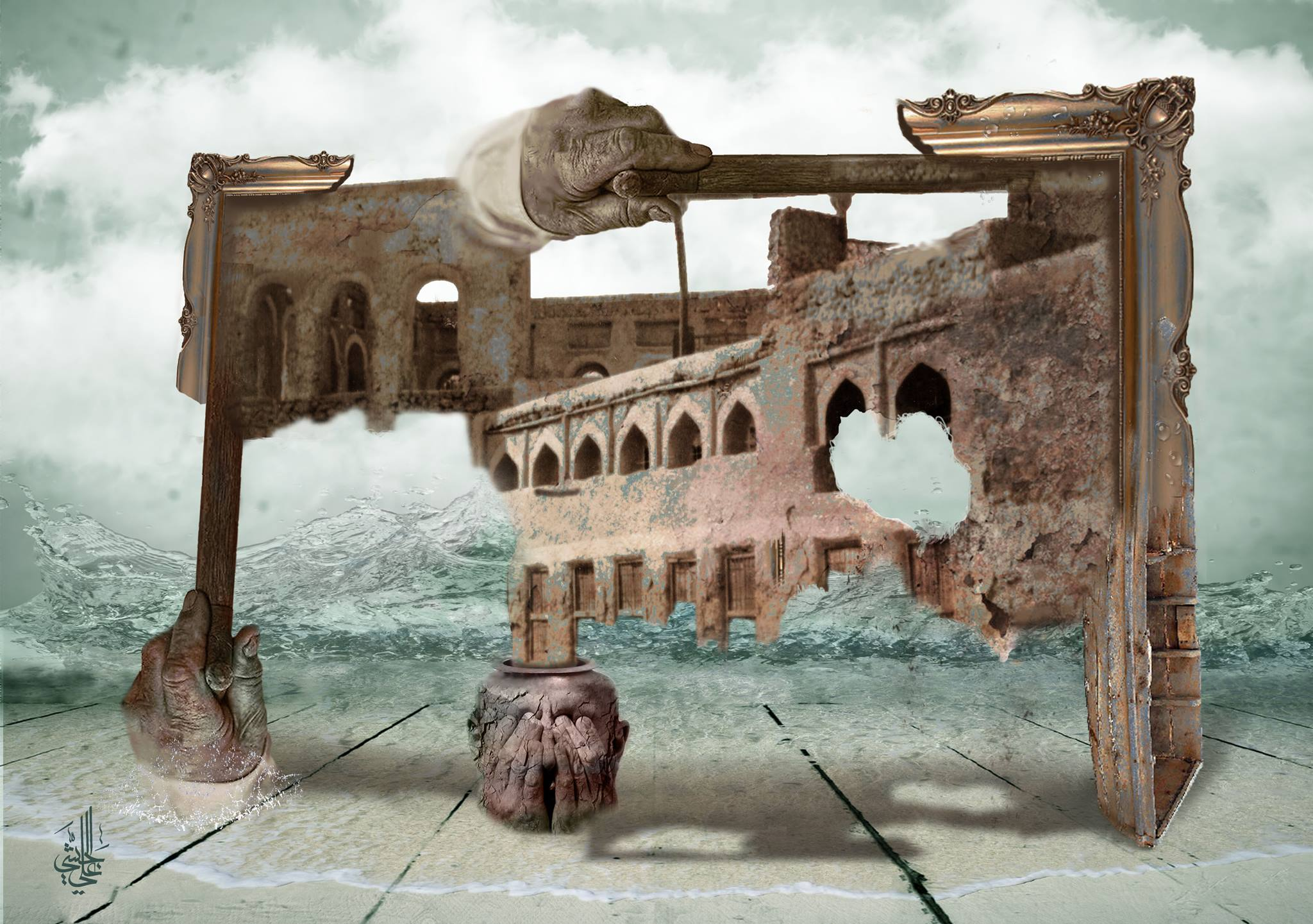
A painting by Ali Al-Gishi depicting the intricate details of the ancient architecture that once defined the houses of Qatif Castle.

Qatif artist Othman Abu al-Lirat created a 1.5m x 2.5m 3D model of Qatif Castle, depicting the structure as it existed prior to the cutting and demolition phases. The model illustrates the surrounding neighborhoods, including the Milk Barah, Horse Barah, Zarib, Warsh, Khan, and Sidra. This artwork is based on Abu al-Lirat's own photographs of the castle, as well as images captured by other photographers in Qatif and aerial photographs taken by the Saudi Arabian Oil Company. Abu al-Lirat has documented Qatif Castle in various stages, capturing its swabit, streets, and corridors by climbing high buildings to take photographs. He also possesses images of the castle during the cutting and demolition phases, beginning with the removal of the first street in 1385 AH.

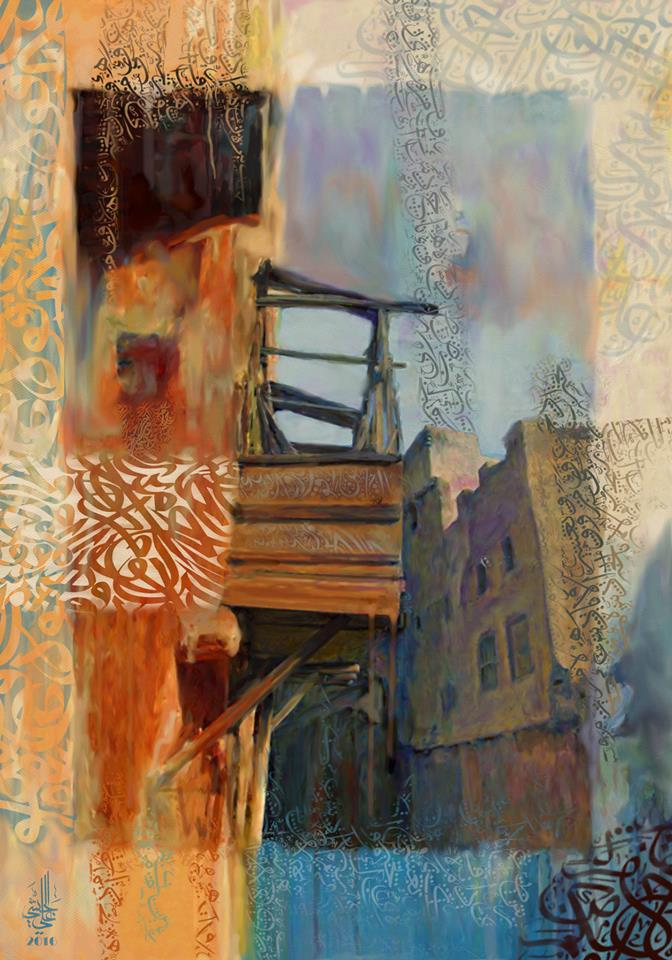
A painting by Ali Al-Gaishi depicting the intricate details of the ancient architecture that once characterized the houses of Qatif Castle.

==== Photographic Documentation ====
- In April 2014, the Qatif Festival Media Committee organized a trip for thirty photographers and videographers to document, study, and photograph heritage sites in the Qatif Governorate. The event was attended by Shura Council member Nihad Al-Gaishi.
- In May 2016, the Kashta Photographic Group conducted a documentation project in the Zurayb neighbourhood as part of a larger initiative to record popular and heritage neighbourhoods, as well as remaining archaeological and tourist landmarks across various areas of Qatif. The project involved the participation of eleven photographers, who attended a workshop led by Al-Gharyafi, who provided insights into the history of the area and highlighted notable architectural features.
- In May 2016, four Qatifis collaborated to produce a documentary film titled 5000 Years, which explores the history of Qatif Castle and other archaeological sites within the Qatif Oasis. The film aims to introduce the Qatif region and the civilizations that have passed through it to a global audience.

==== Sports ====
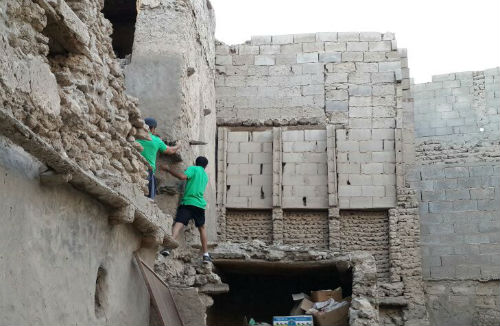
One of the sporting tours highlighting the landmarks of Qatif Castle.

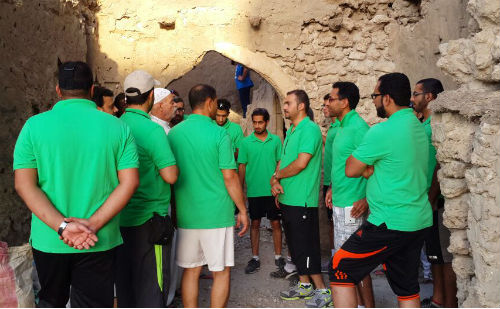
A photograph capturing a sports campaign visit to Qatif Castle.

In June/July 2015, following the Ramadan period, the Qatif Cycling Group resumed its cultural sports tours with a new route linking the ancient civilizations of Qatif and Tarut Castles. The tour, attended by 18 participants, brought attention to the lack of signage and the limited interest from the Tourism and National Heritage Authority in Tarut Castle, a site steeped in history and regarded as the oldest historical landmark in the Arabian Gulf.

=== Literature ===
Qatif Castle has been referenced in poems and literary works, particularly following its demolition.

== Gallery ==
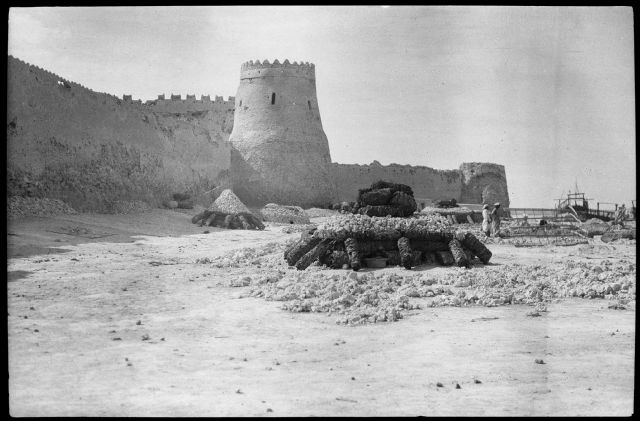
A photograph of the wall of Qatif Castle, featuring one of its towers, taken in 1930 AD.

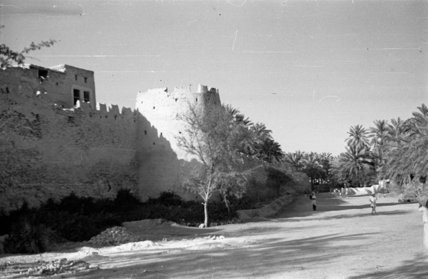
A view of the northern wall of Qatif Castle, connected to the palm forests of Mazraat al-Shammasiya, captured in 1945.

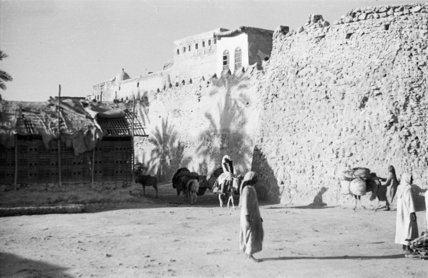
Locals stroll past Qatif Castle, highlighting its towering walls and ramparts.

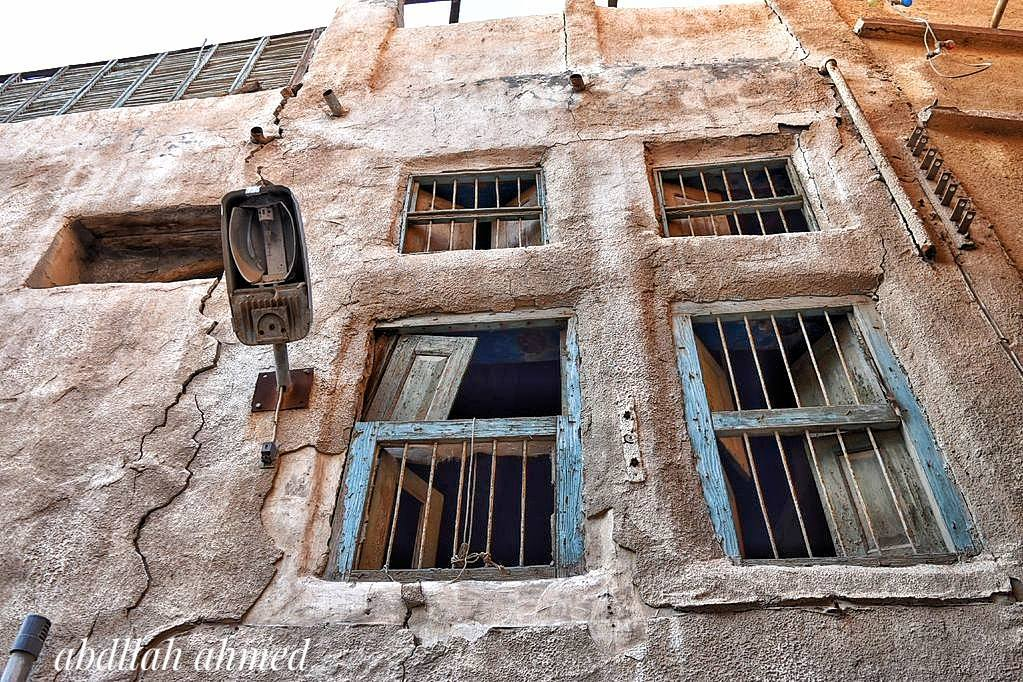
The windows of one of the remaining houses in Qatif Castle, displaying visible cracks and crevices.

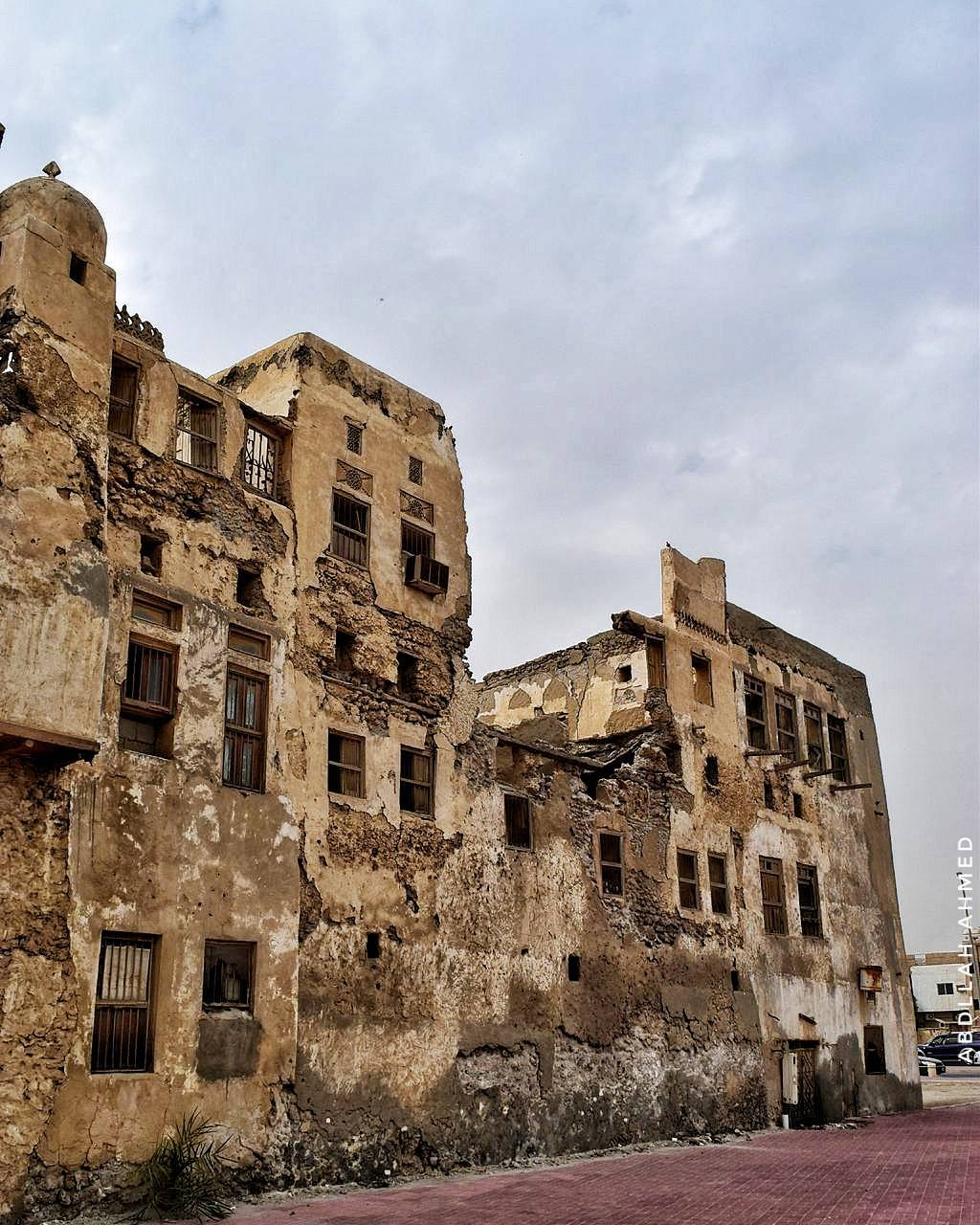
The home of Salman al-Daalouj, one of the few remaining houses from Qatif Castle.

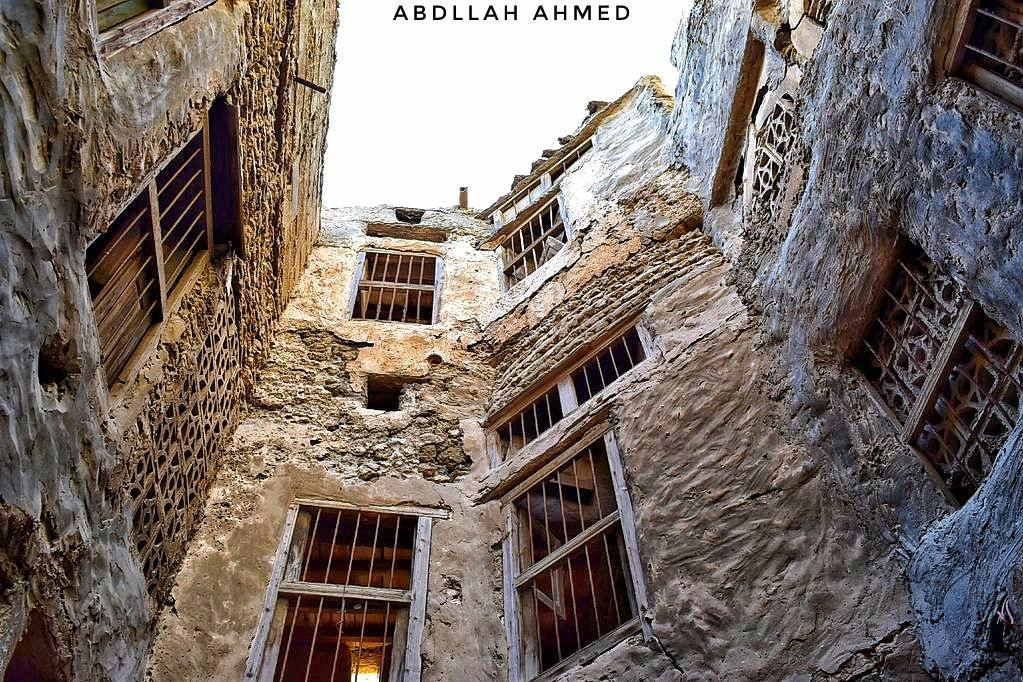
The proximity and cohesion between the houses was a notable architectural feature of the residences within Qatif Castle.

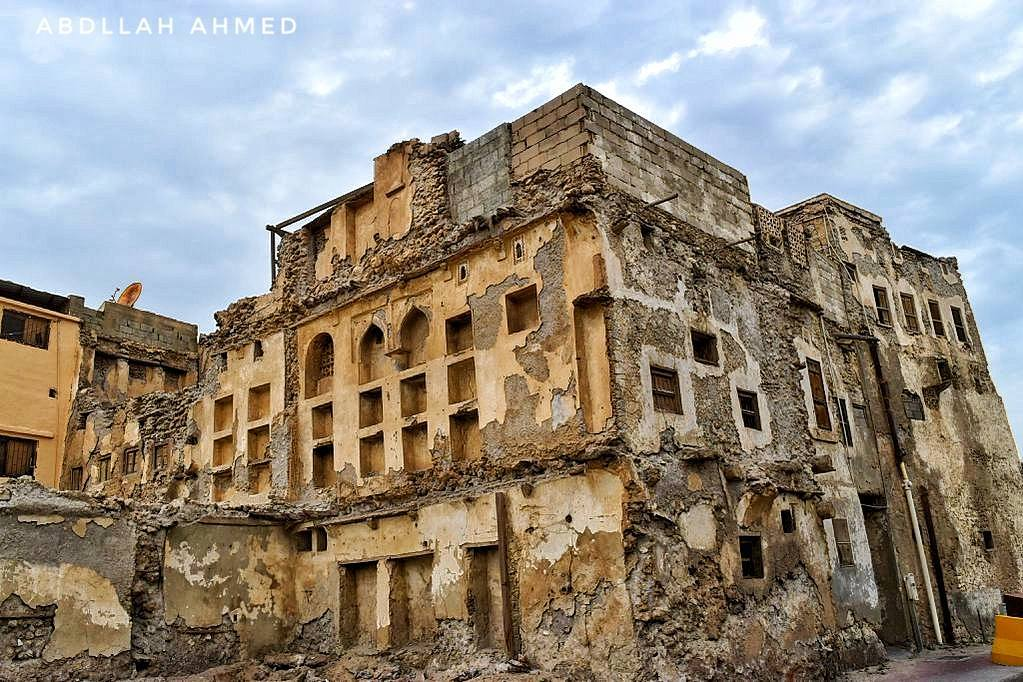
A view of the facade of one of the remaining houses from Qatif Castle, highlighting the architectural decorations alongside the neglect that has contributed to its deterioration.

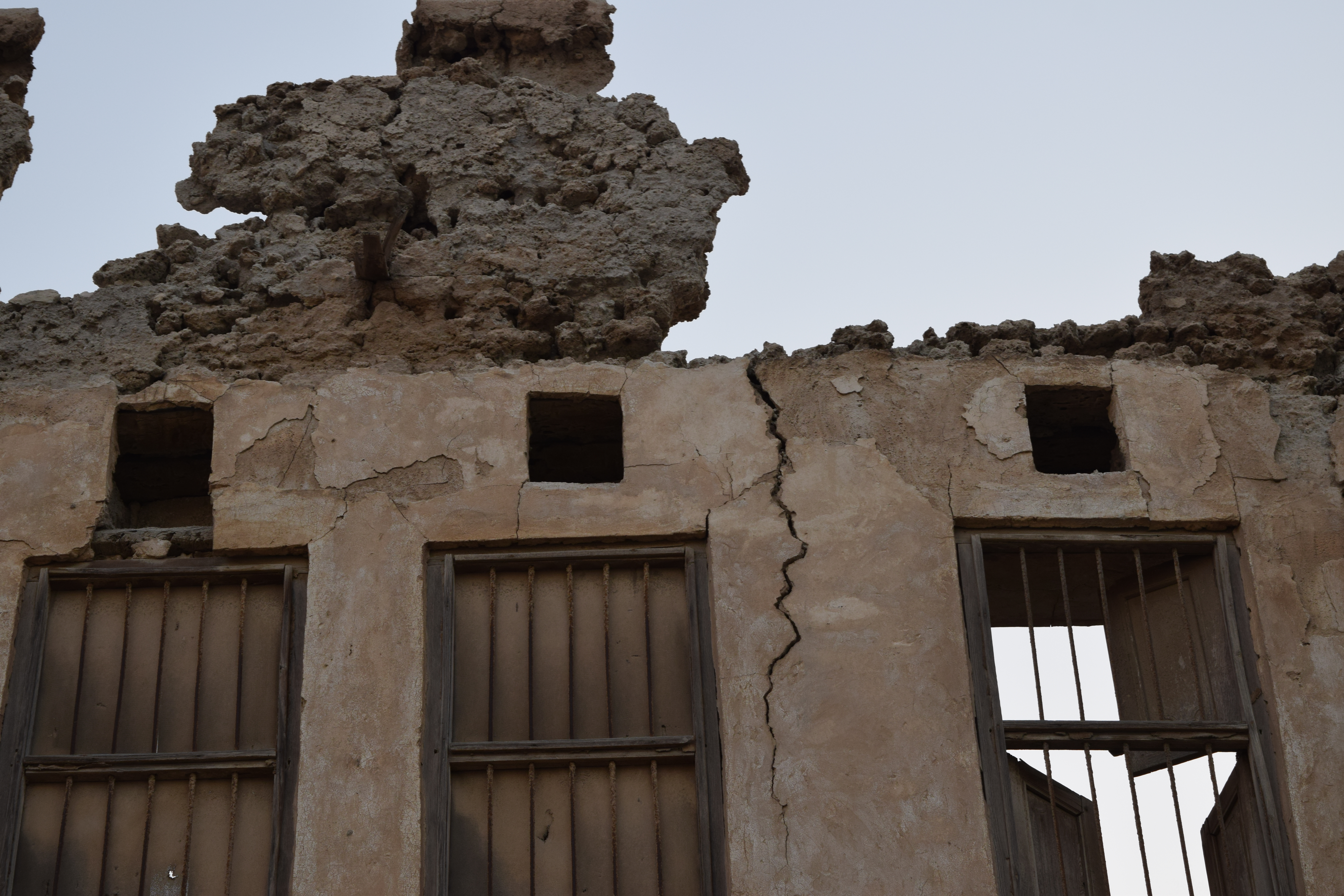
Visible cracks in one of the historic houses of Qatif Castle.

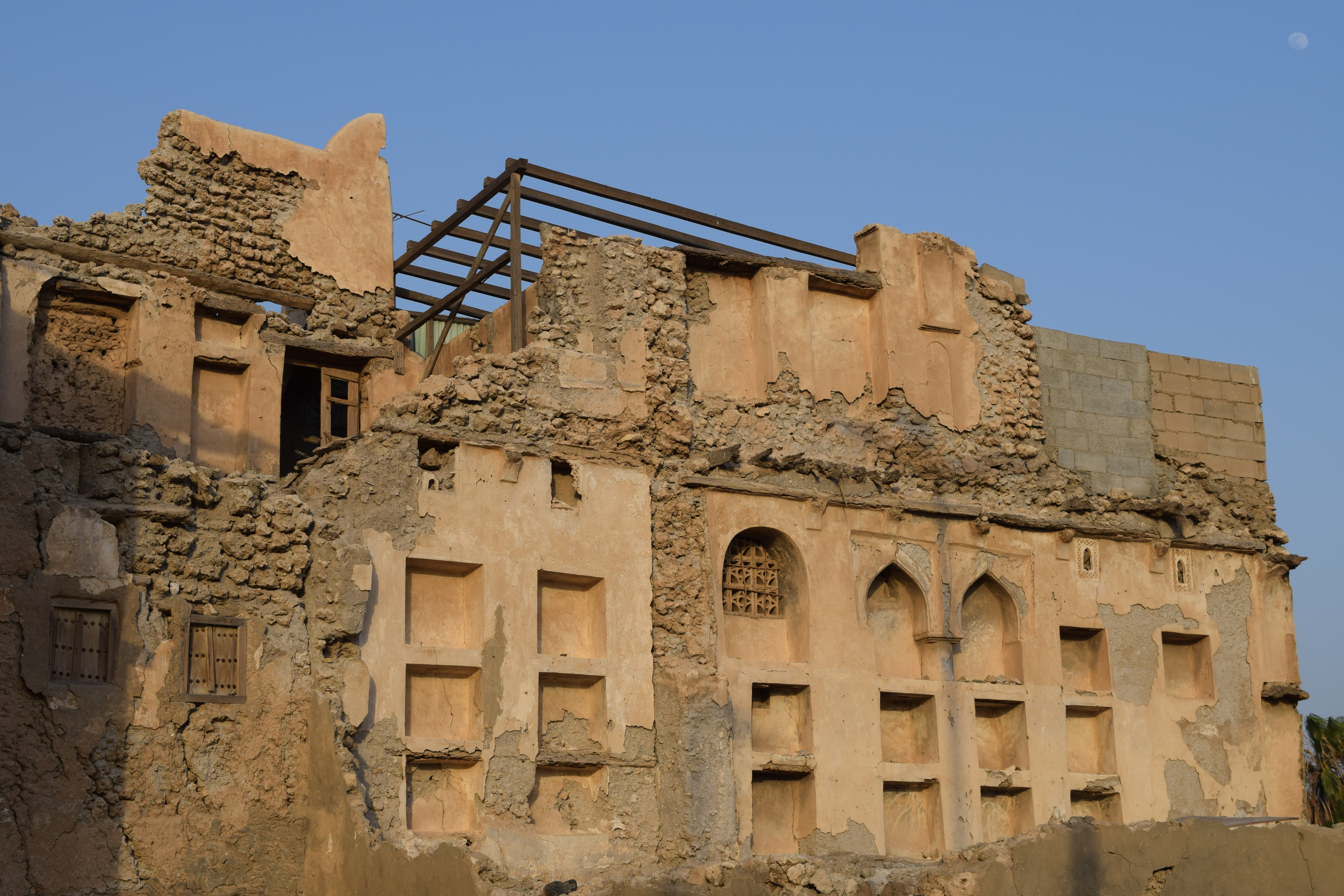
The facade of one of the remaining houses from Qatif Castle.

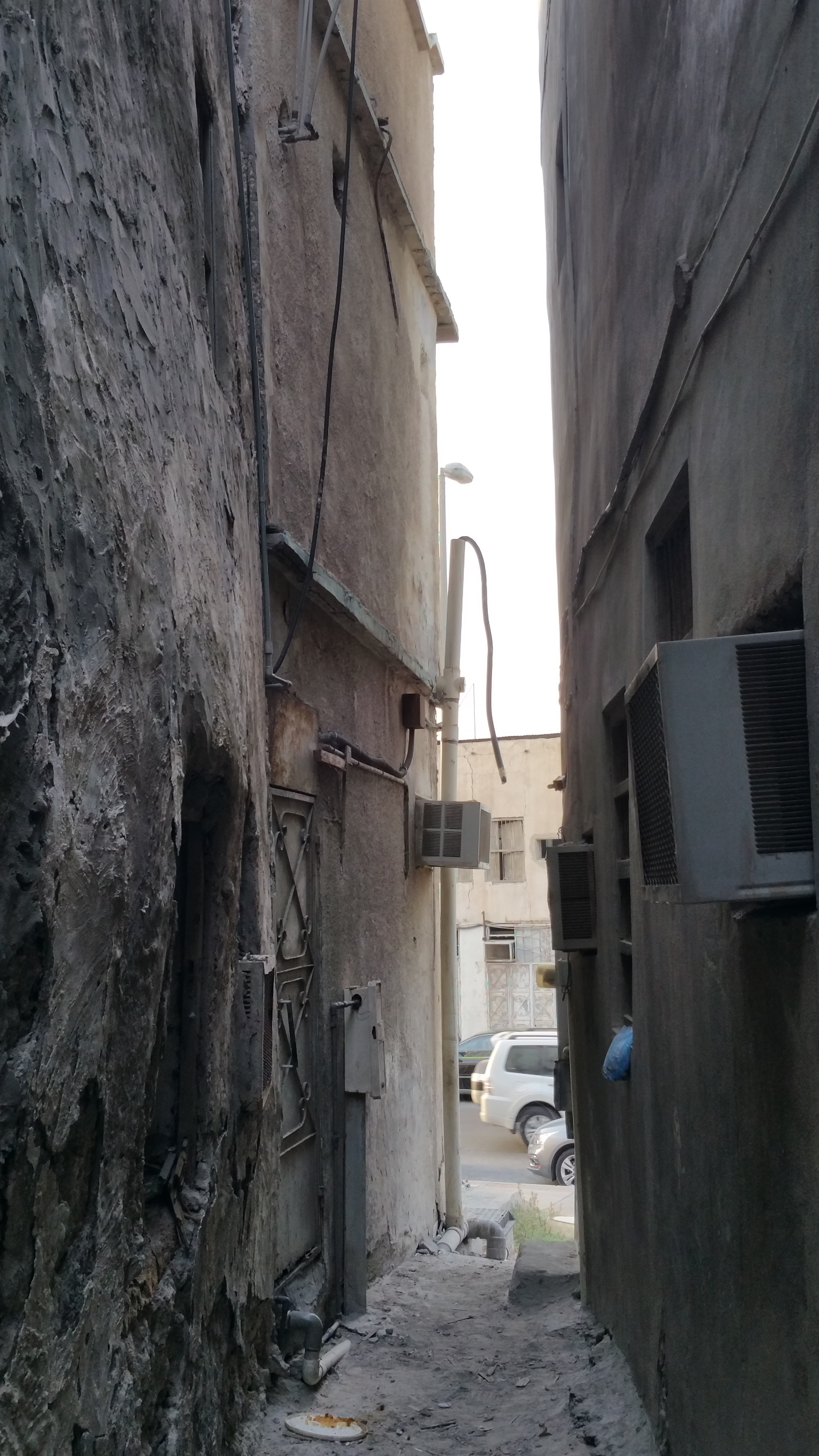
Narrow passageways, known as zaranik, between the houses of Qatif Castle in the Zurayb neighborhood.

== See also ==
- Category:People from Qatif
- Tarout Castle
- Muhammad bin Abdul Wahhab Al Faihani Palace
- Abu Loza's Bath
