= Qatifi architecture =

Historic architectural style native to Qatif Oasis, Saudi Arabia

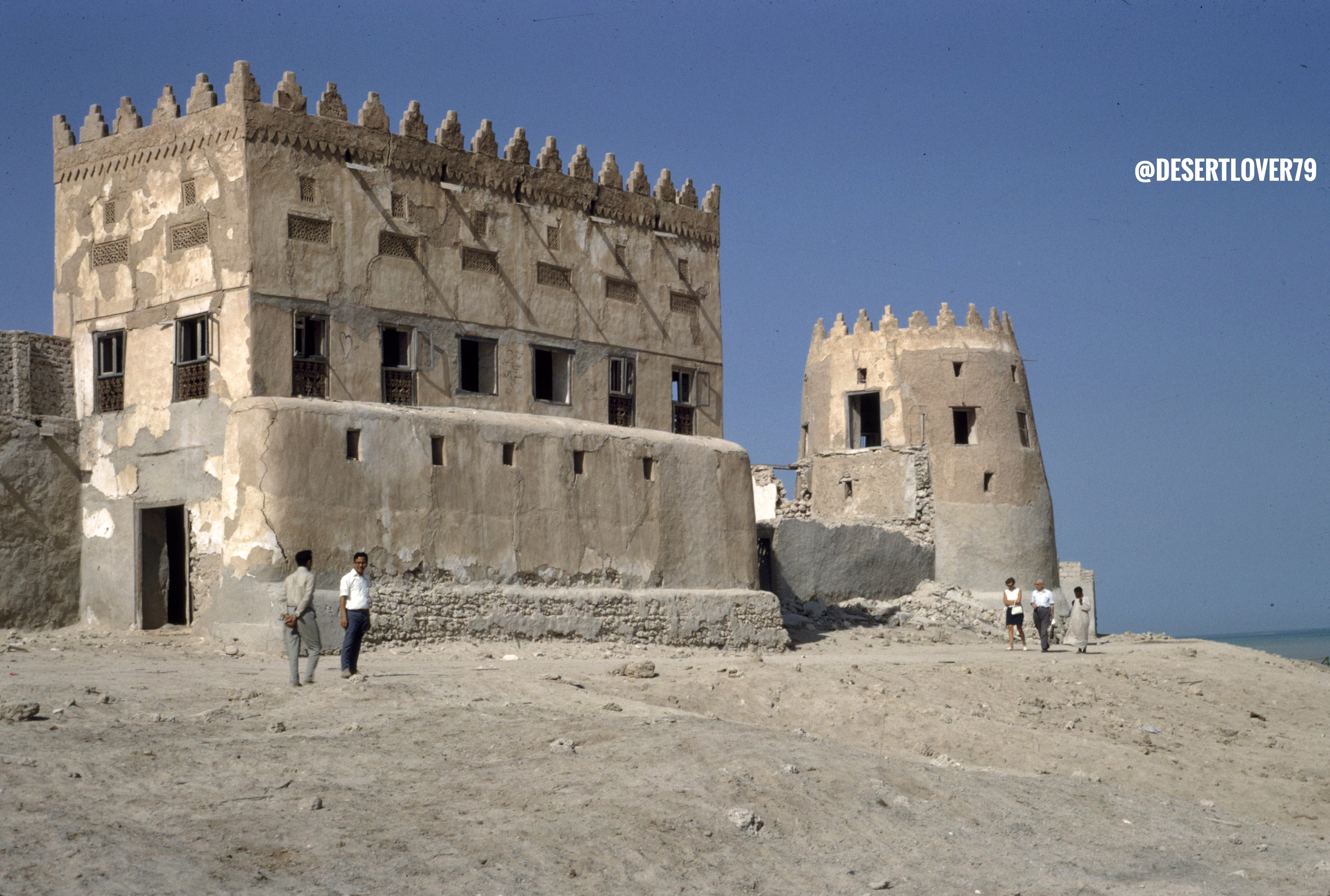
The historic Muhammad bin Abdul Wahhab Al Faihani Palace complex (also known as Darin Castle), constructed using local marine stone (furosh) and mud.

Qatifi Architecture (Arabic: العمارة القطيفية) is a traditional vernacular architectural style originating from Qatif Oasis on the Eastern Province coast of Saudi Arabia. The architectural style developed over more than 5,000 years of continuous settlement and is classified as a form of coastal-oasis vernacular architecture, characterized by vertical multi-story courtyard houses, dense urban fabric, and climate-responsive design shaped by the oasis's hot-humid coastal environment, fertile date palm groves, and the social value of familial privacy (sitr).

Unlike the predominantly horizontal layouts common in other GCC countries traditions, Qatifi buildings frequently reached three to five stories within the confines of fortified settlement walls such as Qal'at al-Qatif and the historic districts of Tarout Island. This vertical expansion preserved surrounding agricultural land while allowing upper levels to capture sea breezes.

Traditional construction materials relied on locally sourced materials, primarily marine limestone (furosh) for structural walls, mud, and gypsum (jass) used for plastering and elaborate decorative cravings.

Houses are typically organized around central open courtyards (al-huwai) that regulate temperature and support family life, with features emphasizing privacy (satr), including small high-placed windows (rawashin), windcatchers (badgir), timber screens, and roofed passageways (sabaat) bridging narrow alleys (zaranik).

Historic landmarks include Qal'at al-Qatif, a 3rd-century fortress that served as the region's urban core until its demolition in the 1980s; Tarout Castle; the five-story Beit al-Jishi residence; and Abu Loza's Bath, known for its sulfur-rich mineral water and Ottoman-influenced tilework. Contemporary preservation efforts under Saudi Vision 2030 include the restoration of sites such as Darin Palace and the historic Dira neighborhood.

== Gallery ==
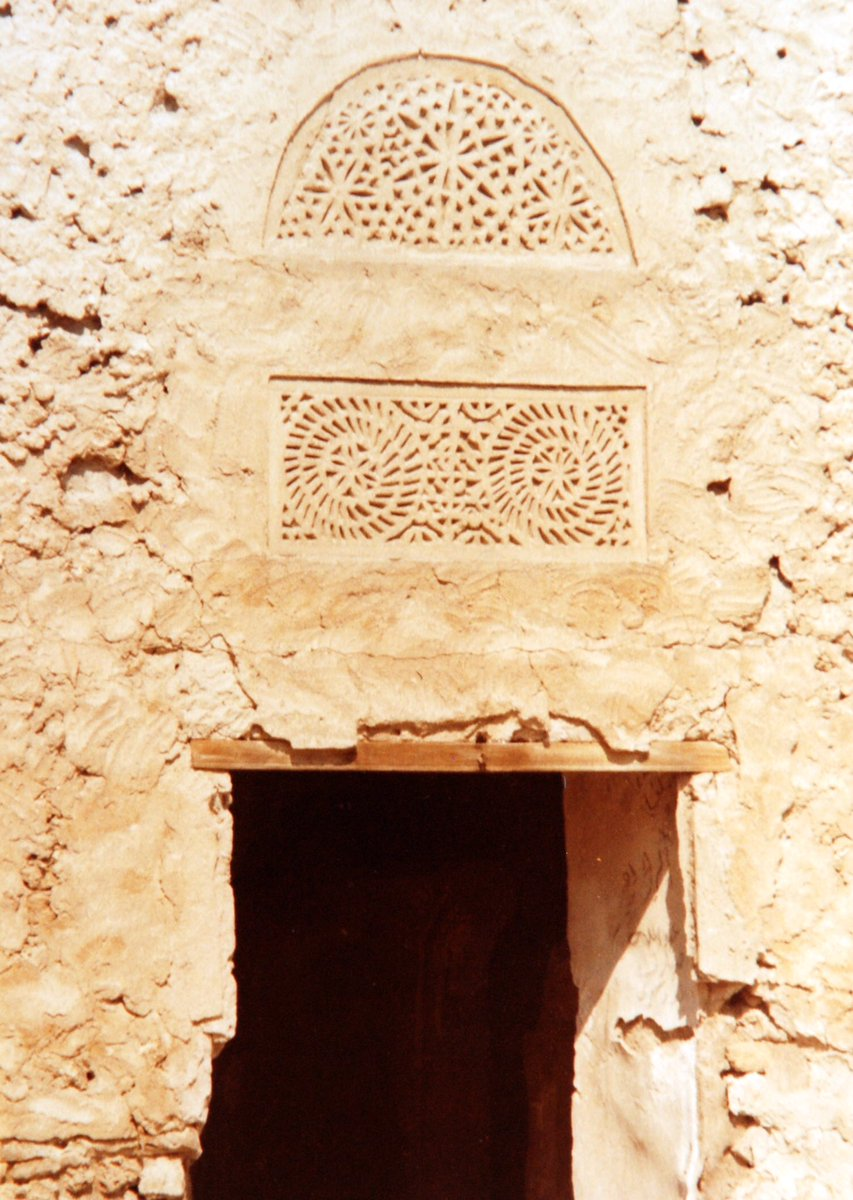

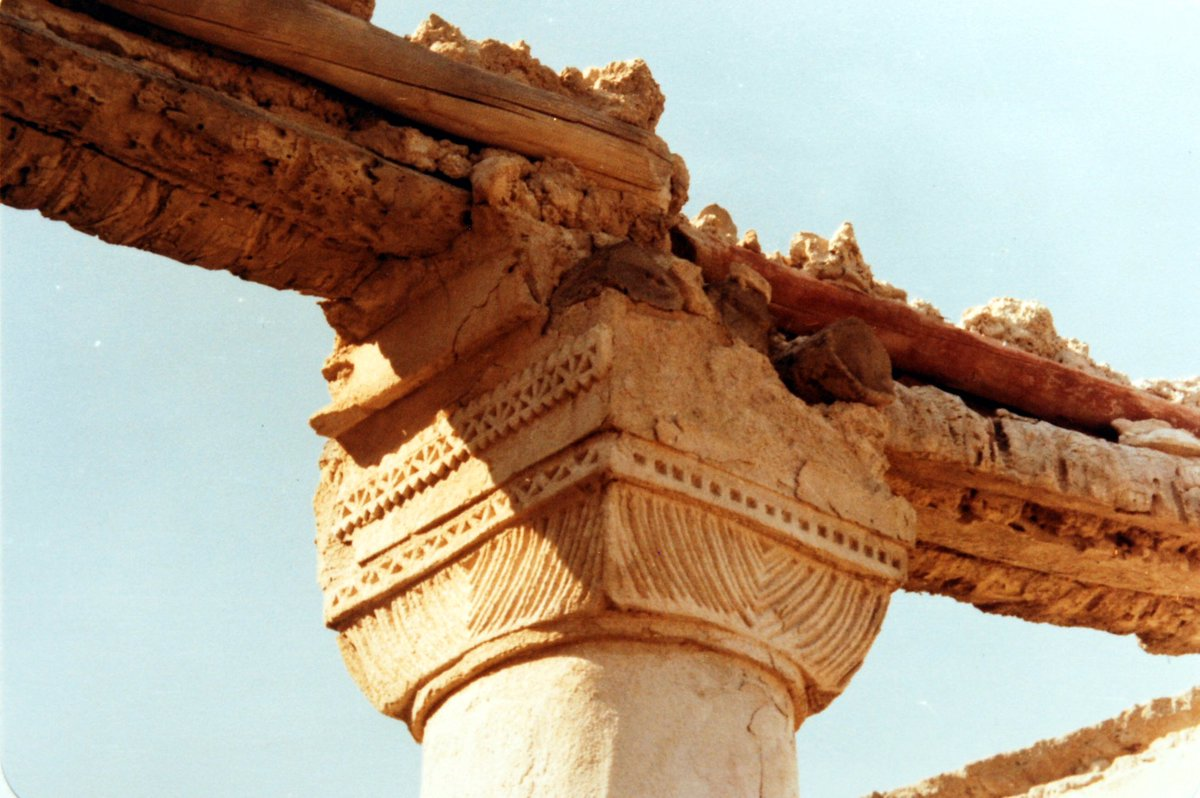

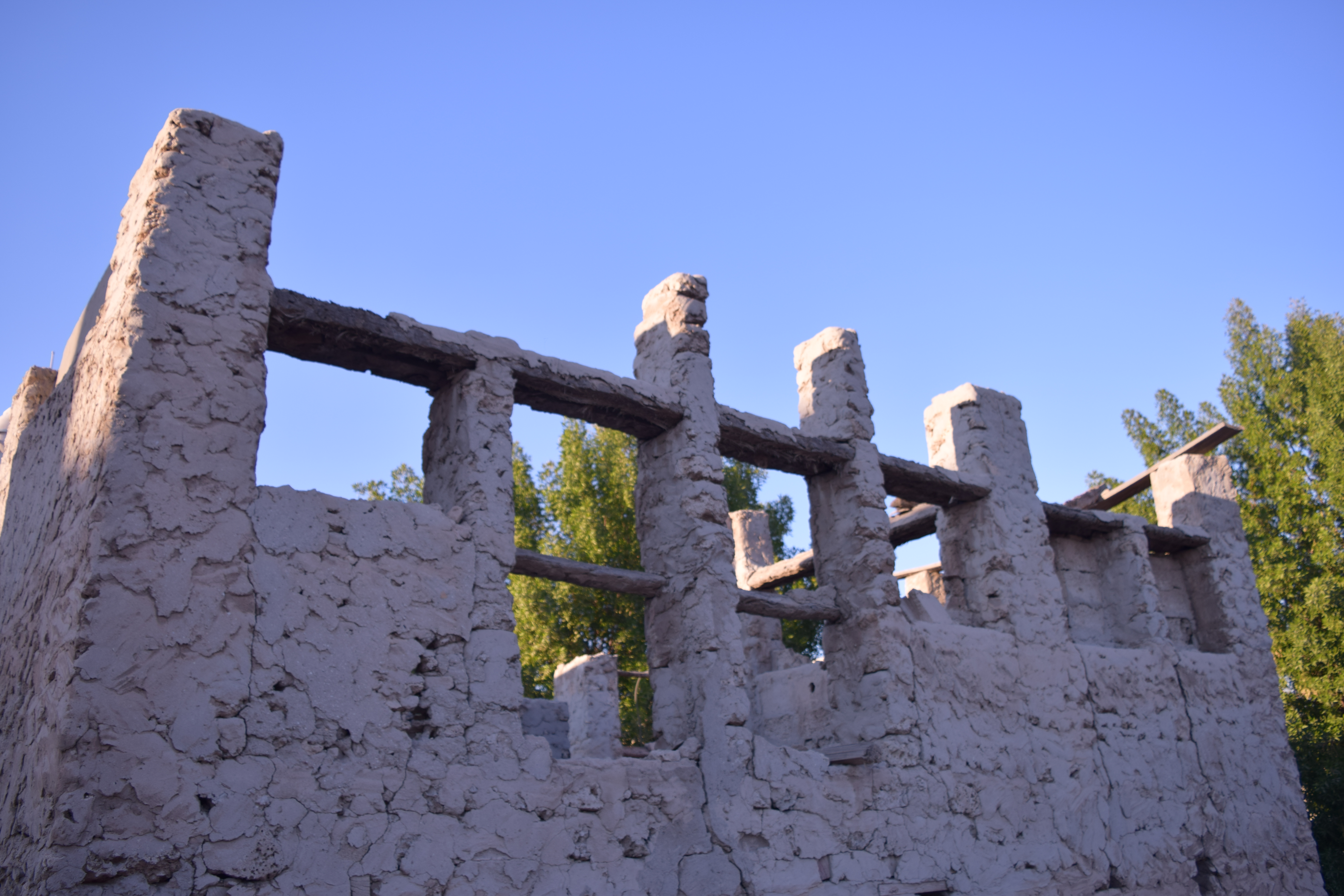

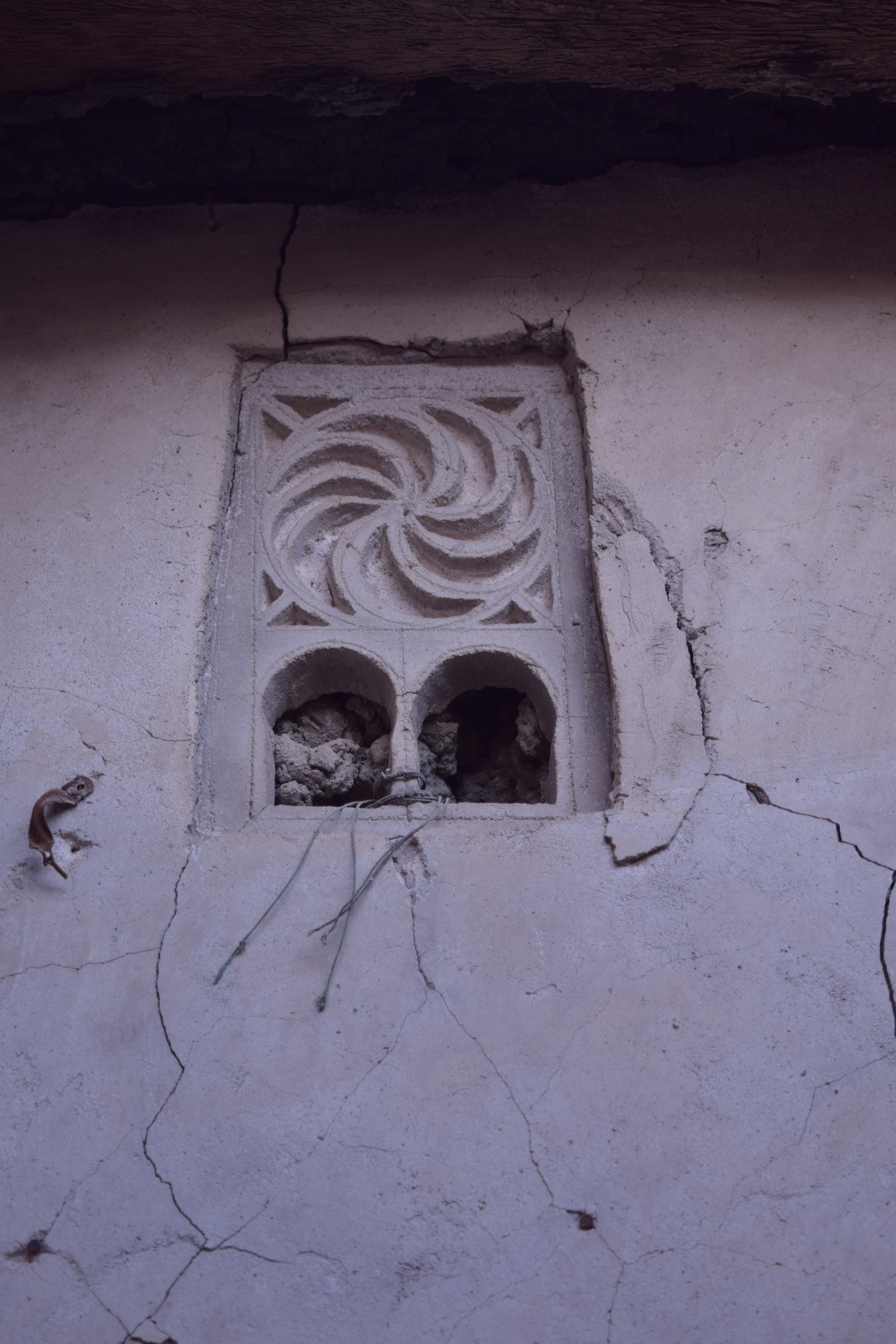

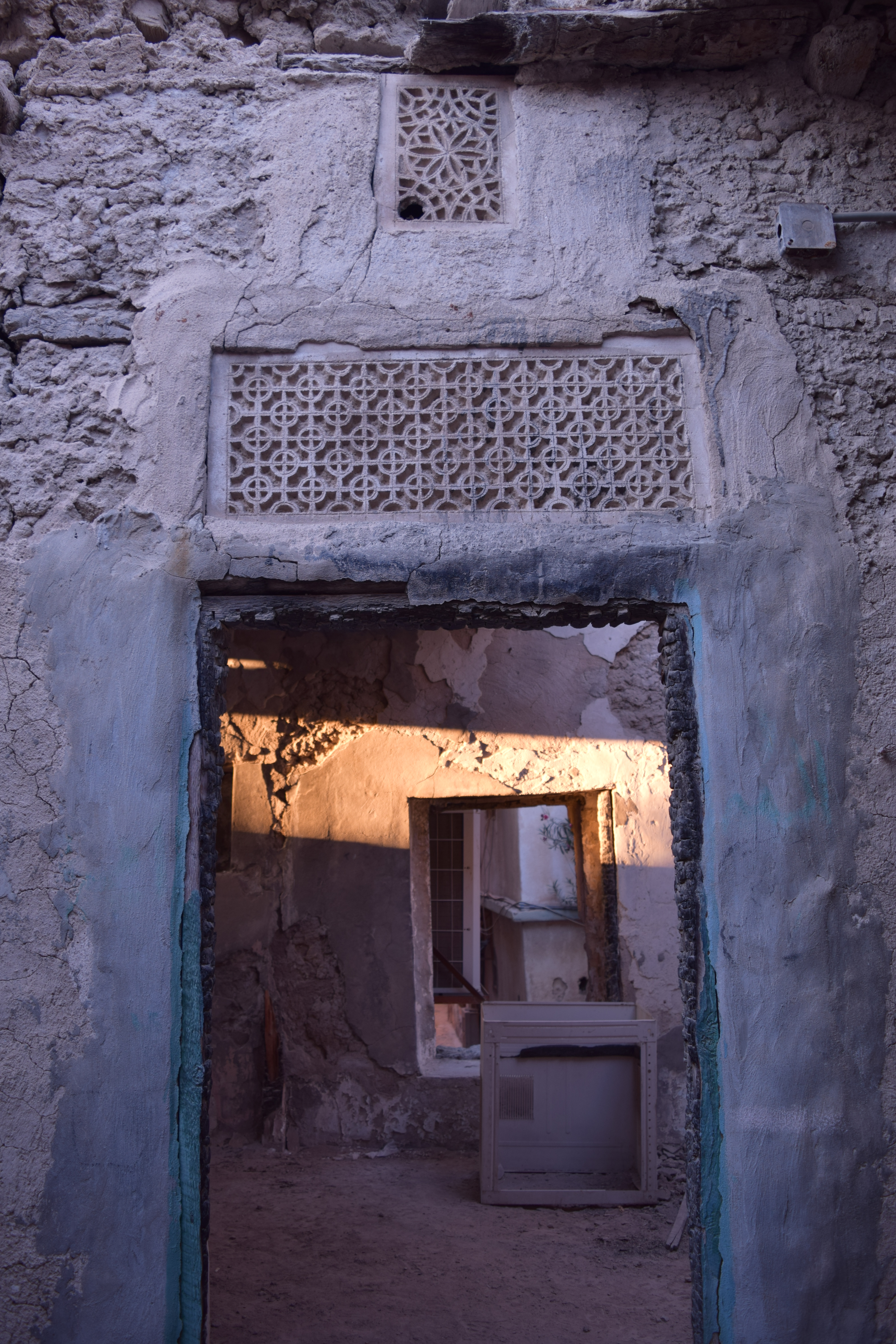

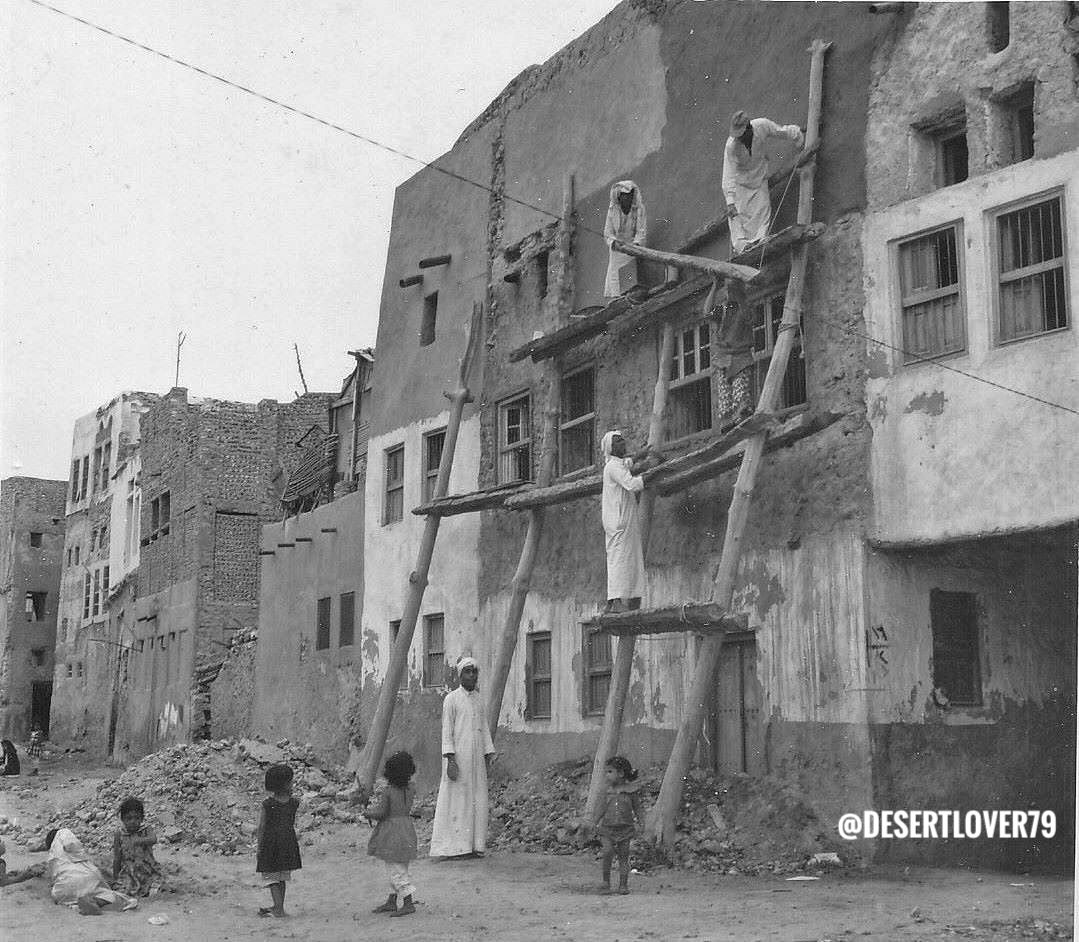

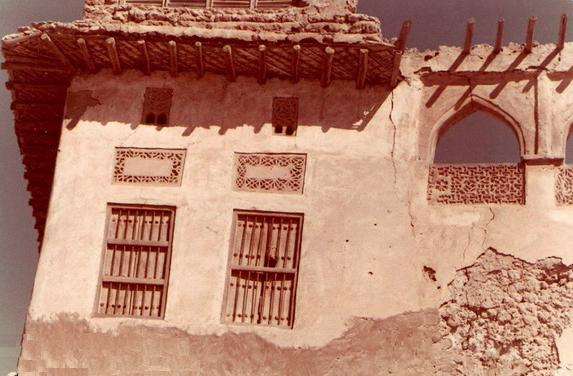

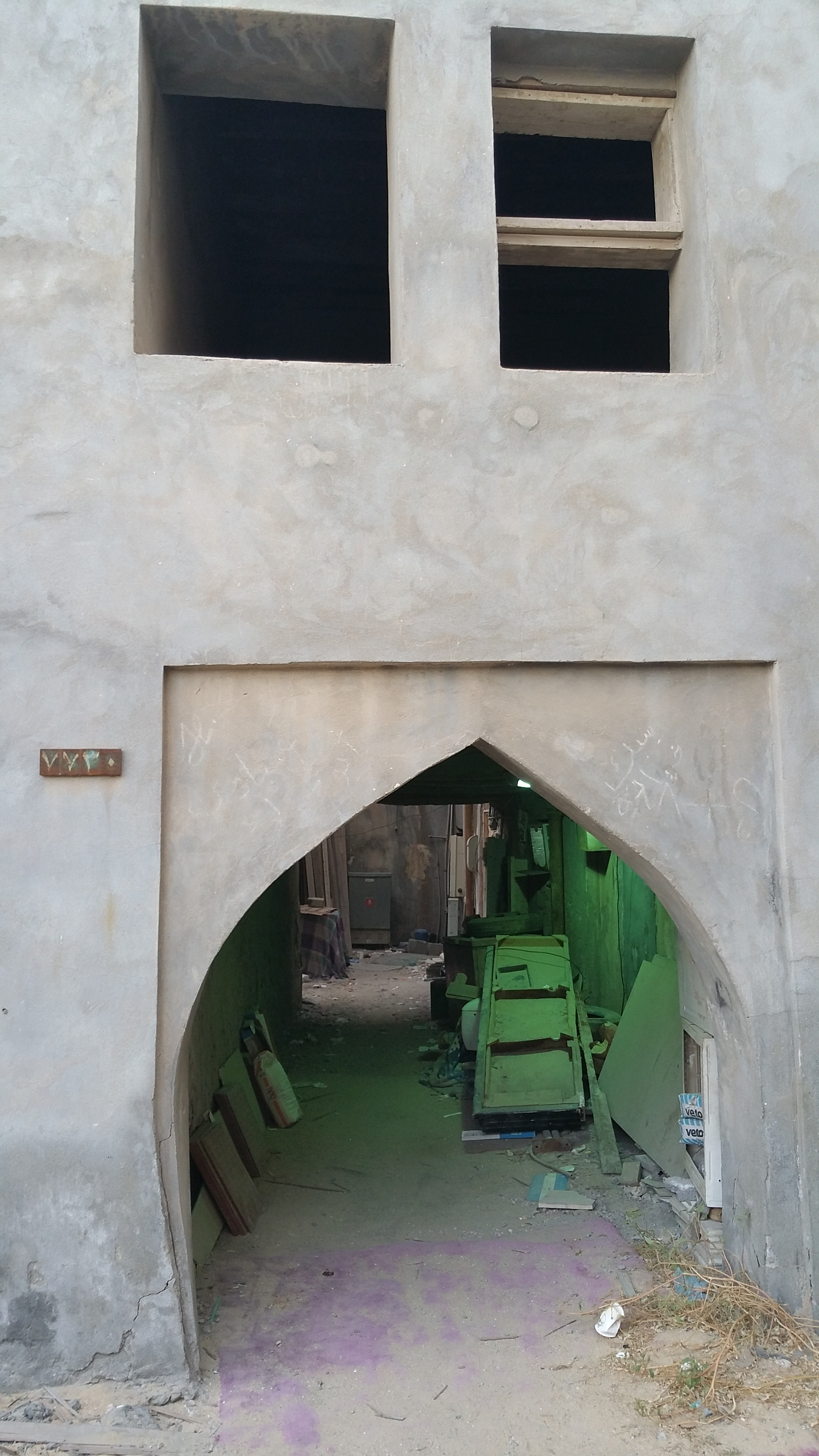

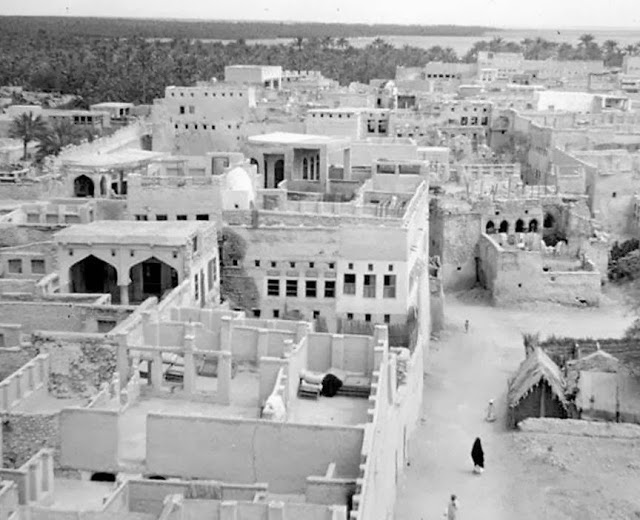

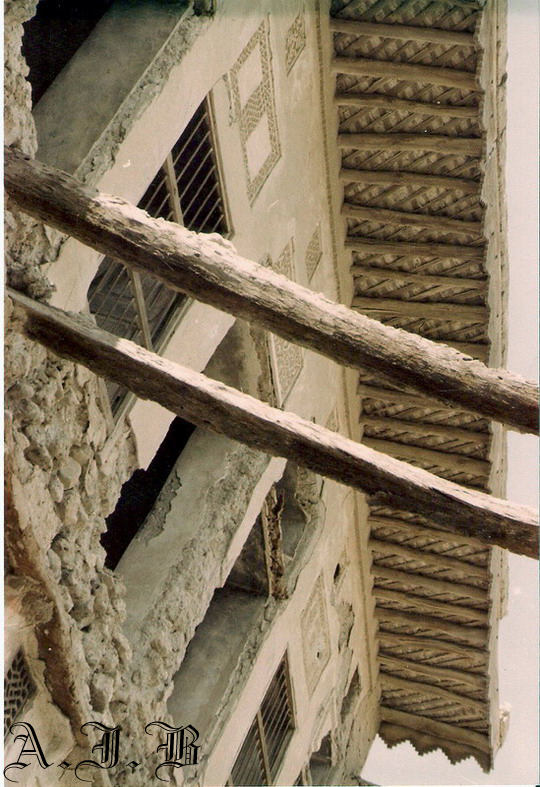

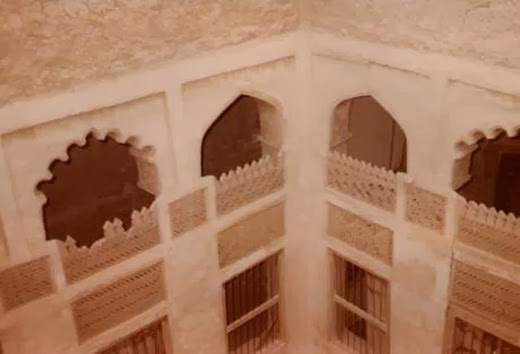
