= Muhammad bin Abdul Wahhab Al Faihani Palace =

Former palace located in Darin, Saudi Arabia

- Darin fortress
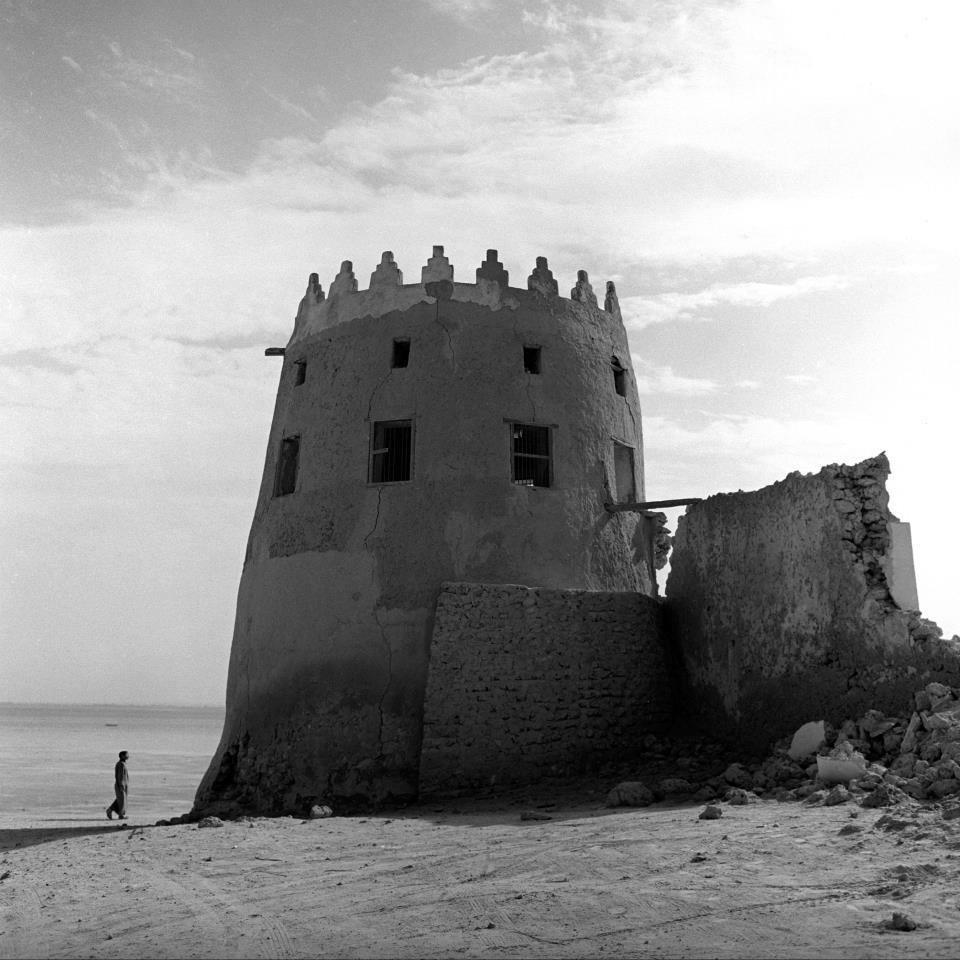
- A view of one of the towers of Darin Castle with the façade of Al Faihani Palace overlooking the sea
- Interactive map of the Muhammad bin Abdul Wahhab Al Faihani Palace area

General information
- Status: Destroyed
- Type: An ancient palace fortified by a historic castle
- Architectural style: Islamic Abbasid
- Location: Darin, Qatif , Saudi Arabia, Saudi Arabia
- Coordinates: 26°32′37″N 50°04′37″E

Muhammad bin Abdul Wahhab Al Faihani Palace, also known as the Al Faihani Palace, is an ancient palace adjacent to a fortress known as Darin Castle. It is located in the village of Darin on Tarout Island in Qatif Governorate in eastern Saudi Arabia. The castle was restored by Muhammad bin Abdul Wahhab Al Faihani between 1884 and 1885 and became known by his name.

The palace and its associated structures are situated at the center of the South Darin coastal arc. The complex encompasses several facilities and annexes, including a group of rooms, warehouses, and a backyard. The walls feature a series of arches, crafted in the style of the Abbasid Islamic architectural tradition. The total area of the complex is approximately 8,000 square meters, including the annexes. The palace and its associated structures are centrally located within the village of Darin, on a prominent elevation close to the sea. The site is in a location between Houta and the eastern district. The palace and its annexes are bordered to the south by a small mosque on a rocky outcrop that gradually slopes downwards until it reaches the sea, where the port of Darin is located. To the eastern extent is a residential area, while to the southeast is the Great Mosque of Darin. In the northern region is an open square, and to the west is an abandoned house. The hill on which the castle is situated represents the accumulation of sedimentary layers, each of which represents a different time period.

Darin Castle took on its historical value during the establishment of the first and second Saudi state, as well as during the era of the Ottoman Empire, but the palace annexes turned into rubble and piles of stones as a result of the collapse of the walls and their fall on each other, and only the foundations of the palace remained.

== Name ==
Darin Castle achieved notoriety following the construction of the palace by Muhammad ibn Abdul Wahhab in its adjacence. The palace was also attributed to him. Although the castle existed prior to the construction of Al Faihani's palace, it is commonly attributed to him, in addition to being referred to as Darin Castle. In addition to the aforementioned names, there were several others that were also popular among the locals. These included Muhammad bin Abdul Wahhab Al Faihani Palace, Muhammad Pasha Palace, Abdul Wahhab Pasha Palace, Jassim bin Abdul Wahhab Palace, and Al Faihani Palace.

The original name of the neighborhood in which the castle is located is believed to be Qibla or Jibla, as it is located west of Darin, where the direction of the Qibla is. The neighborhood derives its name from the Houta of Darin Castle, which served as the headquarters of Ottoman soldiers. The Houta or Qibla neighborhood is separated from the third district by Al-Hala Island, a small bay no more than 500 meters wide.

== Monuments ==
The site of the palace and its annexes is rich in artifacts dating back to different times. Although there has been little excavation in the area. However, artifacts have been found there, including coins dating back to the Umayyad period. Ancient coins dating back to the time of the beginning of Islam were discovered in the 1970s with the two shahadahs written on them. Fragments of a skeleton estimated to date back to around 200 BCE were also found. Part of a human jaw and shoulder were found in the rubble excavated from the excavated land.

In 2014, the research and excavation team of the Saudi Commission for Tourism and National Heritage found a complete set of glass, pottery, and ceramic vessels that likely date back to different eras. In addition to some pottery pieces dating back to the early periods of the Islamic era. Some bones suspected to be animal bones were also found. Finally, the castle has a monument on its southern side that chronicles the treaty that King Abdulaziz signed with the British.

== The palace layout ==
=== View ===
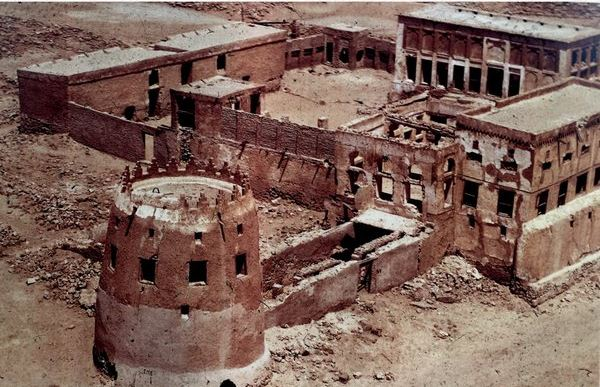
An aerial view of the façade of Darin Castle, behind which the palace of Muhammad bin Abdul Wahhab al-Faihani is visible.

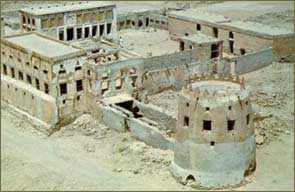
An aerial view of the façade of Darin Castle, behind which the palace of Muhammad bin Abdul Wahhab al-Faihani is visible.

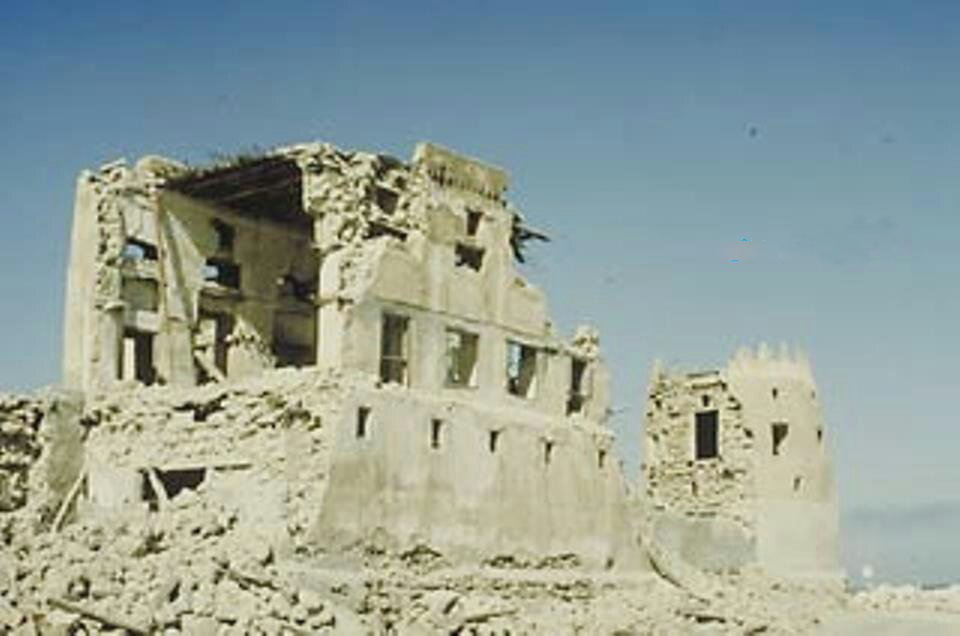
One of the sections of the Muhammad bin Abdul Wahhab al-Faihani Palace after the corridor connecting it to one of the towers fell.

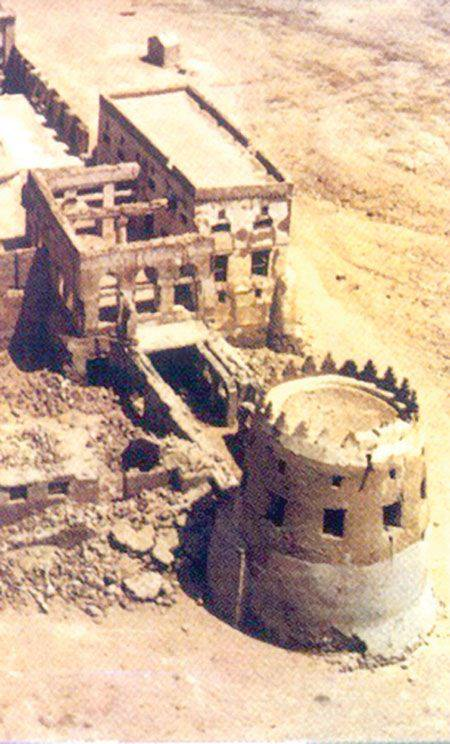
Top view of the tower of Darin Castle before its collapse.

=== General form ===
The palace, with an area of 8,000 square metres, stands adjacent to a semi-rectangular castle. (Note: It is close to a square shape, as shown in the aerial photo taken by Aramco.) Not attached to the houses around it. Built on a moraine hill 3.5 meters above sea level. The castle is a two-story structure with a southeastern tower and a water well in the center. The southern half of the castle overlooks the seafront, while the northern half was abandoned and gradually became ruins. As a result, the boundaries of the original castle are only recognizable from the remnants of the thin lines drawn by the foundations of the walls. The construction of the castle involved the use of maritime stones. In the course of construction, yellow clay and Arabic white plaster were also utilized. Also, locally manufactured gray plaster, which is usually made from burnt sea mud was used. Some parts of the castle were restored with cement in the modern era. Several types of wood were used in the construction of the palace's main support, including Local palm trunks, tree stems imported from India. Mats made from bwari cane and slices of thick African bamboo stalks. (Note: It is locally known as a pasgil.) These materials were used in the construction of castles and houses back then.

=== Rooms and annexes ===
The first floor has three square air vents above it, one on the door, two are on the south side of the castle facing the sea. The second floor contains the remains of a large cannon with a stone cylinder next to it weighing about 100 kilograms. On the second floor is a straight staircase with eight rectangular windows on its sides, (Note: These are square openings, sometimes in other shapes, used for luggage and clothes, locally called roznah.) each window has a handrail and a ventilation hole.

Aramco's aerial image shows that the northern half of the castle is divided into three large squares and three smaller ones. The wall surrounding the citadel is no more than two meters high and forms a large enclosure with a main door in the middle of the north side, with a number of rooms on the eastern side that housed the palace servants. While Al Faihani and his family inhabited the southern half of the castle, which overlooks the waterfront, the abandoned northern half contains ruins and remains of horse stables. The western strip of the northern half of the castle had a small house and a shop belonging to the Razihan family. In the opposite direction, the southern half of the castle had a tower standing in its southeast corner, near the tower is a longitudinal arm with the entrance to the castle and the location of three iron cannons. This part of the castle also includes two-story rooms on the south and west side as well as a group of single-story rooms on the east and north sides, mostly storerooms and council chambers, in addition to a backyard, and a lot of precise architectural elements with Islamic character in its design. Together, these rooms form the family home of Sheikh al-Faihani. The other parts of the building dedicated to military housing and horse stables were gradually demolished with the fall of Ottoman rule in 1331 AH.

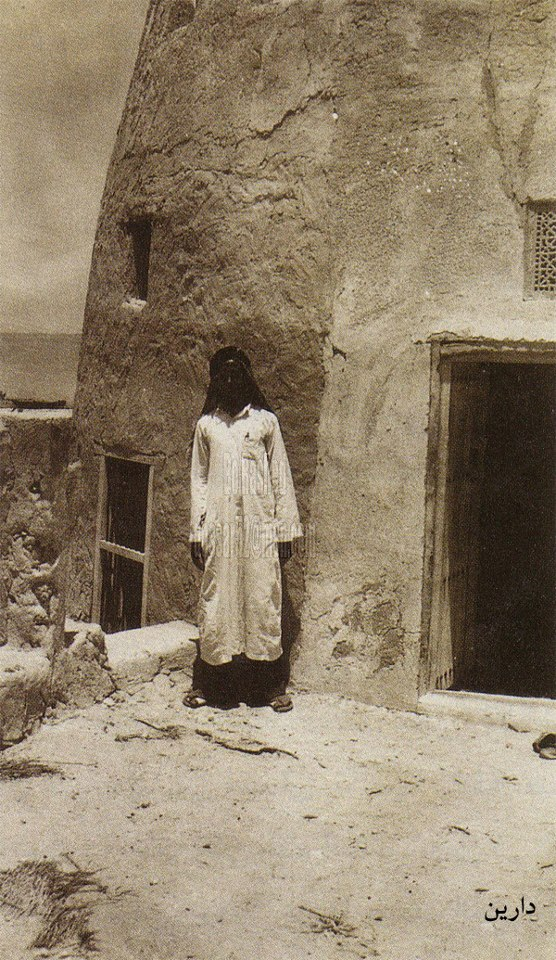
The gate leading to the fortress tower.

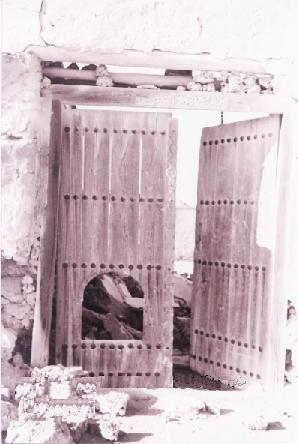
One of the gates leading to the palace.

=== Gates ===
The Castle has three wooden doors covering all sides, including the western door, which is believed to have been used for women, the eastern one for the tower, and the main door in the center.

=== The mast ===
Based on the photo taken by Sir Percy Cox of Darin Castle in 1905 when the Ottoman Empire controlled the region, the flag raised on the castle's mast shows the Ottoman flag, the photo shows that the location of the flag in Darin Castle was at the top of the castle's tower.

== History ==
=== Portuguese Empire ===
Historians believe that the construction of DarinCastle dates back to the 16th century AD during the Portuguese Empire, and that it was first built by the Portuguese invaders during their occupation of Qatif and Bahrain around 927 AH.

=== Al Jalahma ===
John Gordon Lorimer mentions that it was Rahmah ibn Jabir al-Jalhami who built DarinCastle around 1830 AD, and he also mentions that Rahma bin Jaber al-Jalahmi and the Al-Busmeet (Note: Al-Busmeet or Al Abu Samit are from Bani Utba in the Zubara area south of Basra, Iraq, which was settled after it was founded in 1197 AH by the merchant Ahmed Rizk.) clan could not resist the hostility of the people of Qatif, he was forced to emigrate to Muscat in 1831/1246 AH after the demolition of the Castle. Rahma ibn Jabir Jalahmi and his son Bishr lived there for a year after it was built. He and the Al Bu Sumait clan with him in Darin, at the behest of the Imam of Muscat, to use Darin as a springboard for launching military attacks against the Al Khalifa, the rulers of Bahrain It is also likely that the construction of Darin Castle predates Rahma bin Jabir's settlement, as Rahma settled in Darin for one year, which is not enough time to build a Castle with a total area of more than 8,000 square meters. (Note: According to real estate agent Al-Dalal Youssef Saleh Al-Sada, who has been appointed by the Al-Faihani family to offer the palace land for sale, the total area recorded in the title deed is estimated to be around 8,000 square meters. This estimate may be inaccurate, as the original castle boundaries have faded over time.) Other historical sources state that the conflicts that Darin witnessed during the establishment of the Saudi state with the state of Bahrain led to the sending of a military expedition by Abdullah bin Ahmed Al Khalifa. He occupied Darin along with Tarout in 1249 AH, which led to the migration of the Samit family to the coasts of Persia, after which they settled in Kuwait, while the Jalahma, led by Bishr, migrated to Muscat, where he died.

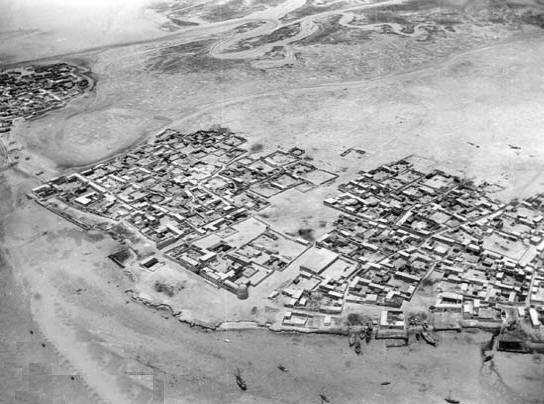
Darin in 1947

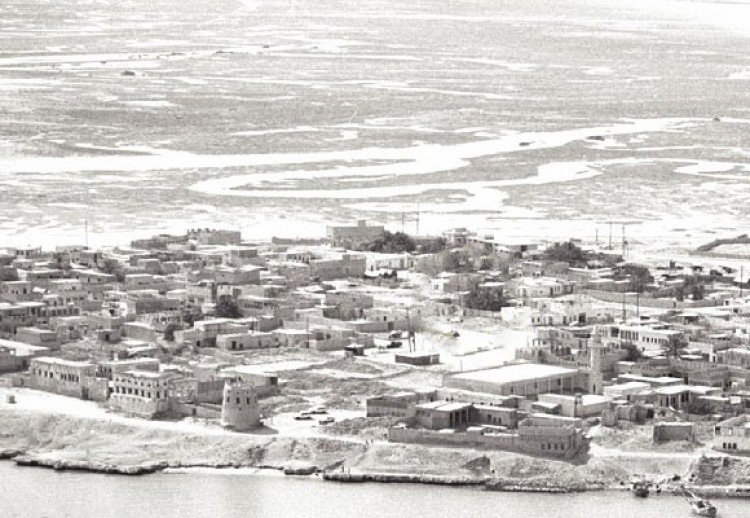
Another aerial photo shows the castle clearly visible in front of the houses.

=== The Ottoman Empire ===
Darin remained abandoned until 1288 AH, when it was visited by the Ottoman governor of Baghdad, Ahmed Medhat Pasha, in his campaign to overthrow the second Saudi state. Darin Castle was mentioned in the reports of the Ottoman governor Ahmed Medhat Pasha during his visit to Qatif in 1871. The governor of Baghdad, Ahmed Medhat Pasha, sent an Ottoman military expedition to Al-Ahsa, Qatif, and Qatar in 1872 under the command of Nafez Pasha, and annexed the three areas to the Ottoman Empire. He made Hofuf the center of the Al-Ahsa Brigade, followed by Qatif and then Qatar. He also attached several dependencies to Qatif, the most important of which are Dammam, Anak, Darin, and Tarout. (Note: Qaim Maqam is the most senior administrative position in the district, appointed by the central government in Astana. His duties revolve around administrative, financial and security matters and the implementation of state instructions referred to him by the governor of the Al-Ahsa Brigade.) The Qaim Maqam's duties include nominating subordinate district administrators and inspecting the districts and villages under the jurisdiction. It is proven that Muhammad ibn Abdul Wahhab al-Faihani, when he lived, lived through eleven Maqams of the judiciary from the period of Khalil Agha to the period of Najib Bey. The news of Darin Castle being used as a headquarters for Ottoman officers and soldiers is also mentioned in a number of historical documents, including the following text written in 1888 AD.

Nafez Pasha traveled from Basra to Qatif first, stayed there for five or six days, identified the needs of the region, and traveled to a number of castles established by the Saudi family when they ruled this area. This was to prevent attacks that could come to Qatif from the sea, and when these forts were destroyed over time, they came face to face with the enemy. These forts, each located about an hour or two away from Qatif, are of great importance for the protection of Qatif's harbor. These forts, each located about an hour or two away from Qatif, are of great importance for the protection of Qatif's harbor. After the evacuation of the soldiers from the barracks established in Ras Tanura during the Al-Ahsa campaign, this barracks was destroyed, as were the coal stores built for the ships going to Qatif. When the Najd Mutsarfiyyah was established, a water spring was created next to the castle to water the gardens in the village of Tarut in Qatif, but it was destroyed. When the Najd Mutsarfiyyah was established, a water spring was created next to the castle to water the gardens in the village of Tarout in Qatif, but it was destroyed and became unusable. (Note: In the original translation: "The eye on the castle was destroyed." This may be an oversight on the part of the author.) The Pasha asked property owners to raise funds to repair the castle and restore the eye to its previous service, and he also issued orders to the Qatif mayor to fix the other castles. (Note: In 1306 AH, the Qatif mayor was Hassan Jamil Effendi.) The Pasha granted Muhammad ibn Abdul Wahhab, the first inhabitant of Darin Island, two hours from Qatif, he also ensured that half of the soldiers sent to Qatif were accommodated in this area due to its mild climate. It is clear from the text that Nafez Pasha transferred half of the soldiers residing in Qatif to Darin, and the number of these soldiers whose stay in Darin Castle was secured was thirty, they take orders directly from the Qatif mayor, this was confirmed by a letter from Sheikh Mubarak Al-Sabah, the ruler of Kuwait, to Colonel Kimball the Acting Political Resident in the Gulf, written on Muharram 10, 1320 AH, contains the following text:

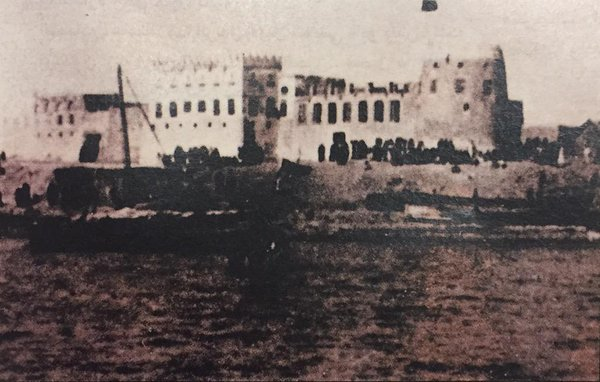
An old photo of the palace with the castle from 1905.

In these days, the Turks sent thirty soldiers from Qatif with Ibn Jum'ah to the island of Amayer to stay in it. (Note: Al Amayer Island is a Muslim island near the city of Jubail.) The Turkish soldiers were forced to return to Qatif with the intention of settling there permanently, but the Amayer did not allow them to stay. And go to Darin to stay with Ibn Abdul Wahhab. This is the state of affairs, but taking action is your business.

The document shows that in that year, the Qatif mayor, Mansur Pasha bin Jumaa, transferred the thirty Turkish soldiers from their permanent headquarters in Darin Castle to Al-Muslimiyah Island, north of Jubail. Because the Muslimiyah district administrator Khalidi, who resides in the Muslimiyah Island Castle with a group of Amayers, refused to allow the soldiers to stay on Amayir Island, the soldiers insisted on returning to their permanent residence in the Darin Castle. (Note: The job of the Sheikh of Al-Amayer in Al-Muslimiyah Island is mentioned in the following text: "Al-Amayer Island... It is subordinate to the Qatif Qaim, and there is no work for the soldiers in it other than guarding the Ottoman flag, and the Sheikh of Al Khalid in the island is called the director of the district." See The Gulf Guide, Geographical Section, Part IV, by J. J. Lorimer. J. J. Lorimer, pp. 1624 and 1625.) In addition to the visit of Governor Ahmed Medhat Pasha to Qatif and Darin, the castle was mentioned in the reports of the Ottoman commander Nafez Pasha during his first visit when he conquered Qatif in 1872, and in his second inspection visit to Qatif in 1888.

During the last period of Ottoman rule, from 1871 to 1912, the function of Darin Castle was limited to administrative and customs matters, its purpose was to monitor and collect fees and taxes for the Ottoman treasury at the Qatif district center. Darin Castle contained a private residence for the local administrator, rooms for officers, a number of stores, an artillery shop, a horse stable, and likely a small prison as well. At the time, it was similar to Ibrahim's Castle in Al-Ahsa, which contained a private residence, the officers' and soldiers' room, warehouses, an artillery shop, a prison, a hospital, and a small religious school.

No document has been found in Darin that shows the occupation of Sheikh Muhammad ibn Abdul Wahhab al-Faihani after he settled in the port of Darin in the Qatif district, however, during his stay at Darin Castle, Wimmer recalls that the Ottoman administration in Al-Ahsa offered Muhammad bin Abdul Wahhab Al-Faihani in 1891, just five years after his final settlement in the port of Darin, the Ottoman administration in Al-Ahsa. To move from Darin to the northern Qatari port of Zubara and serve as the director of the Zubara district of Qatar, but al-Faihani refused this offer, preferring to remain in Darin. This indicates that al-Faihani held the position of director of Darin district, equivalent to the position he was to be transferred to in Zubarah.

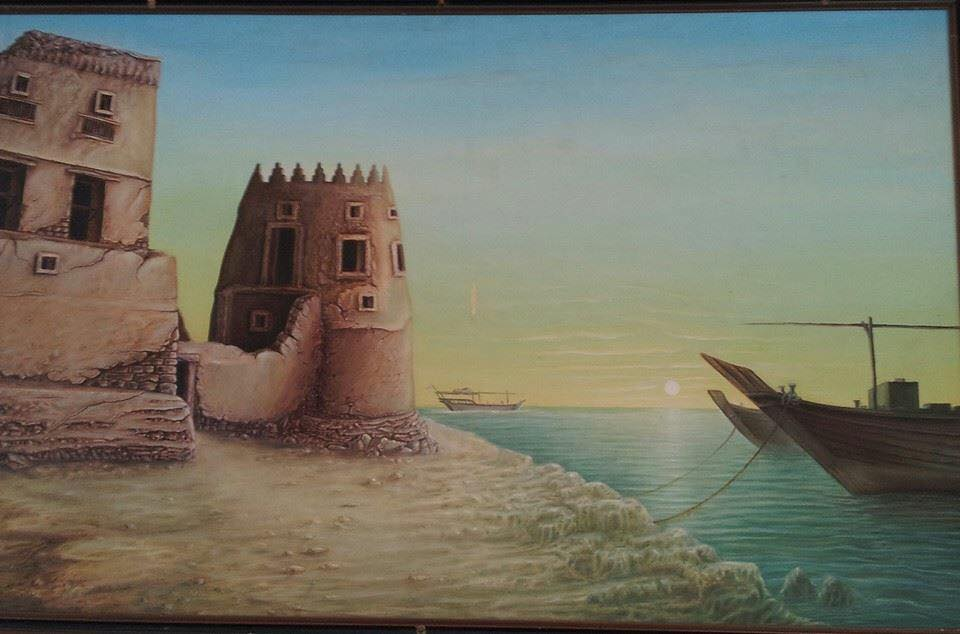
A painting of Al Faihani Castle by Taruti artist Abdul Azim Shalli.

=== Saudi Arabia ===
During the period of the first and second Saudi state, from 1797 AD to 1871 AD, the castle was used as a defensive Castle and a center for collecting customs duties on Tarout Island. Some reports said that Saudi rulers who ruled the Qatif region from 1797 to 1871, during the first and second phases of the Saudi state built the palace. It was gifted by the first Saudi state to Muhammad ibn Abdul Wahhab al-Faihani to live with his family after he emigrated from Qatar following the Ghariyah War. A power struggle broke out in Qatar between some of its sheiks, which prompted 250 families from the Ghariyah region in northern Qatar, including Al Bu Ayninin, Al Faihani, Al Harun, and other families, to migrate to Bahrain and then to Darin, they established the East Darin neighborhood and restored the Darin Castle with donations from residents. Al-Faihani had a dispute with the former ruler of Qatar, Sheikh Jassim bin Muhammad Al-Thani, in 1882. When the tribes of Qatar, led by Nasser bin Jabr and the Abu Kawara family, led by Muhammad bin Abdul Wahab al-Faihani, who was no less wealthy and inclined to rule and preside than Sheikh Qassim bin Thani, came to Qatar, he caught them in Qasr Rabia in the town of Gharbia in Qatar, the hometown of Sheikh Muhammad al-Faihani (Note: The people moved to Bahrain in 1879) From there, Al Faihani moved to Tarout Island and was gifted the palace by the first Saudi state after being built on old foundations. Al Faihani restored and renovated the castle before moving in on November 10, 1885. Darin Castle was one of the castles and Castlees arranged and prepared by Prince Faisal bin Turki to confront Al Ameer and Al Khalifa.

J. J. J. Lorimer's description of the castle in the Gulf Guide from 1908 to 1915 is as follows:

"The village of Darin is protected by a square Castle, there are no gardens or agriculture, and residents own 15 pearl fishing boats." (Note: He goes on to mention in his book that the number of houses at that time was 100, and that the residents were mostly Bani Khalid with a few Janaidat, and 100 houses for the masters, all of whom were Sunnis.)

Sheikh Muhammad bin Abdul Wahhab Al Faihani lived in Darin Castle with his family from the time he moved to the town of Darin until his death in India. His son Jassim continued to live in the Castle and after his death it gradually became the property of members of the Al Faihani family. Immediately after the fall of Turkish rule in the region, the Castle continued to be owned by Al-Faihani's heirs until the Tourism and Antiquities Authority wrested ownership of the land after an agreement with the heirs.

== Beliefs and myths ==
The Darin Castle and the Al Faihani Palace were part of the landmarks that sailors used to mark their positions. Due to the richness of the crescent-shaped ribbon in the center of the castle in terms of relics and skeletons, a fairy tale has been circulating among the people of Darin that explains why they found so many pottery vessels, and skeletons that they are not used to the non-Islamic burial method, according to this myth, the inhabitants of the island of Darin were once infidels who were ravaged by God three times, with each ravage forming a layer or a destroyed city according to their beliefs.

== Improvements and restoration ==
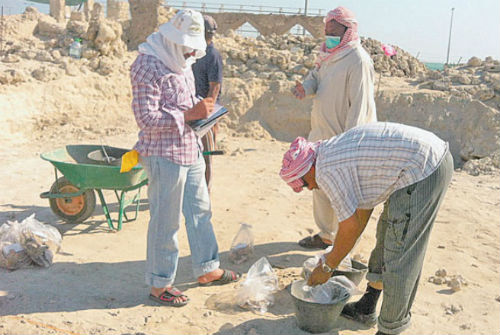
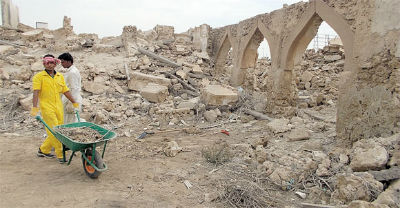
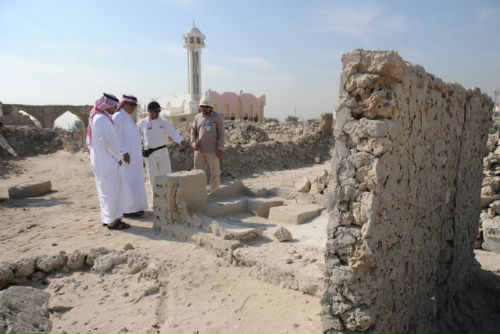
Various photos of several cleaning and excavation operations of the fortress and palace.

The palace remained intact until the late 1970s, when the walls began to fall down one by one. After the palace collapsed, the Tourism and Antiquities Authority in the Eastern Province began cleaning and removing rubble and debris. Then the process of defining the boundaries and foundations of the palace and its courtyards on the southern and eastern sides began, the excavation began where the cleaning ended, and at the same time the restoration began in the northeastern part.

- September 2011: Civil society demands from interested people and historians to actually begin rebuilding the palace by the Tourism and Antiquities Authority, and the old area should be rebuilt and rehabilitated, as neglect has led to the demise of some historic houses that are more than 500 years old.
- May 2013: Reshaping and redrawing the plan of DarinCastle. Elders shared what they remembered to help redraw the plan of the Castle in shapes and dimensions to help the team.
- March 2013: Removing rubble and debris from the palace, General Authority for Tourism and Antiquities branch in the Eastern Province began removing the rubble and debris that fell inside the building from the Mohammed bin Abdul Wahab Palace. The removal of rubble from the collapsed rooms and walls of the palace revealed that the site has preserved some of its walls and foundations, workers at the site confirmed that the cleanup took weeks to complete. The cleanup was followed by a search for documents related to the palace, and then the excavation process, according to Dammam Museum Director Abdulhamid Al-Hashash.
- July 2014: Jalal Al Haroun, an official at the Urban Heritage Office, said that the cleanup phase of the site has been completed. Then comes the stage of lifting surveys and making engineering plans for the entire castle and the heritage houses attached to it. Due to the destruction of most of the castle's structure, the team had to refer to about forty different heritage photos to determine the details of the castle, its doors, windows and carvings in cooperation with specialized engineering offices, which were submitted to the Authority's management in Riyadh.
- November 2014: Plans to restore Darin Castle and fence off the entire palace to prevent thefts.
- November 2014: Excavation work at Darin Castle begins every day for six months. The team, which includes Dammam Museum Director Abdul Hamid Al-Hashash and eight other researchers, is working to determine the quality, period, and nature of the finds through analysis and study. The first phase involved cleaning, removing debris and sorting stones, then identifying and clarifying the foundations of the palace and its courtyards on the southern and eastern sides. The cleanup work includes removing damage to the site such as trees, removing debris and stones, and digging up to three and a half meters. The authority noted that it has developed a restoration program in conjunction with the excavation of the castle, which is rich in antiquities concentrated on its northeastern side, a full program will be carried out to restore the Castle. The restoration phases will cover the entire site, which is 8,000 square meters, while at the same time discovering any antiquities found in the Castle during the six-month excavation period.

== Current problems ==
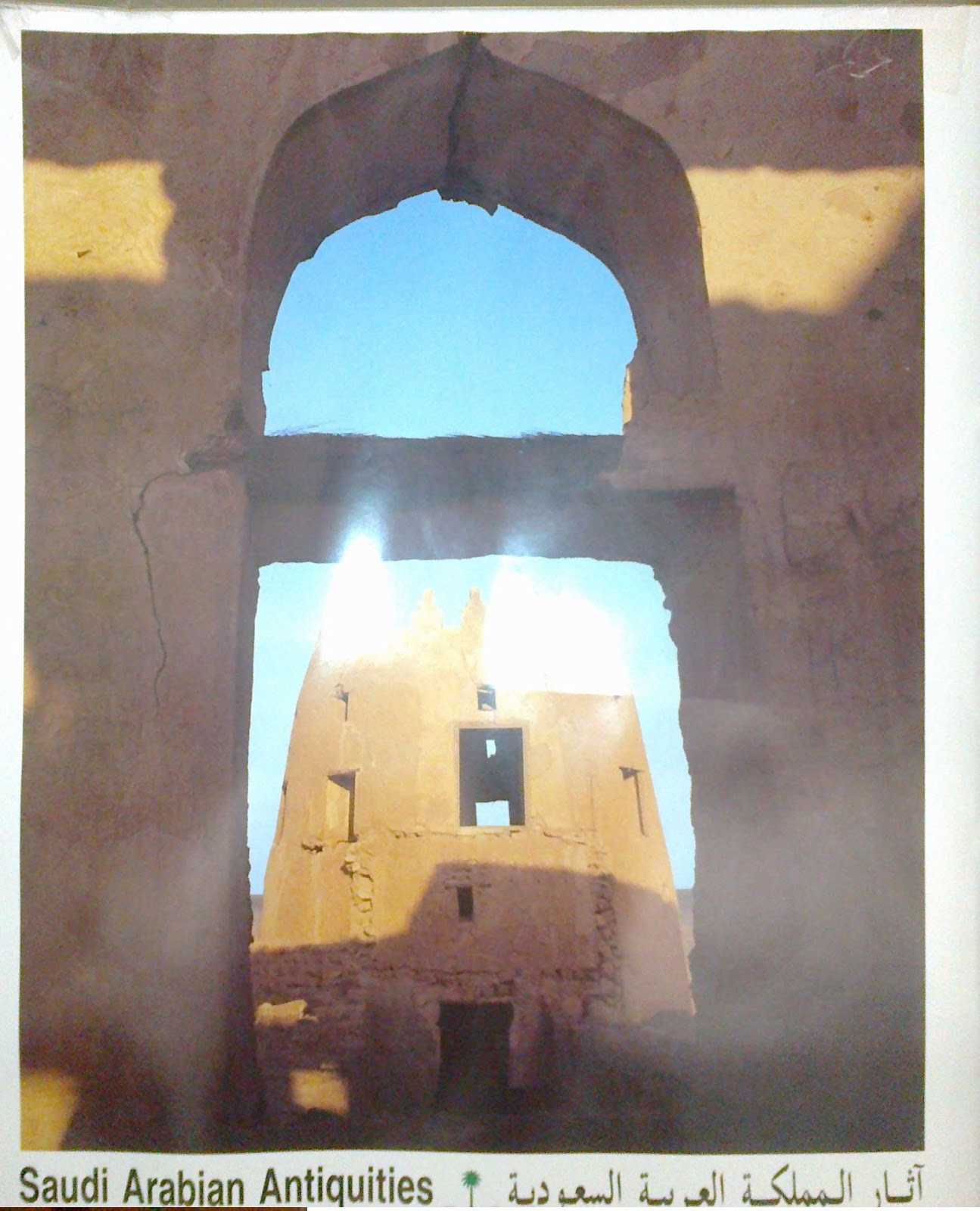
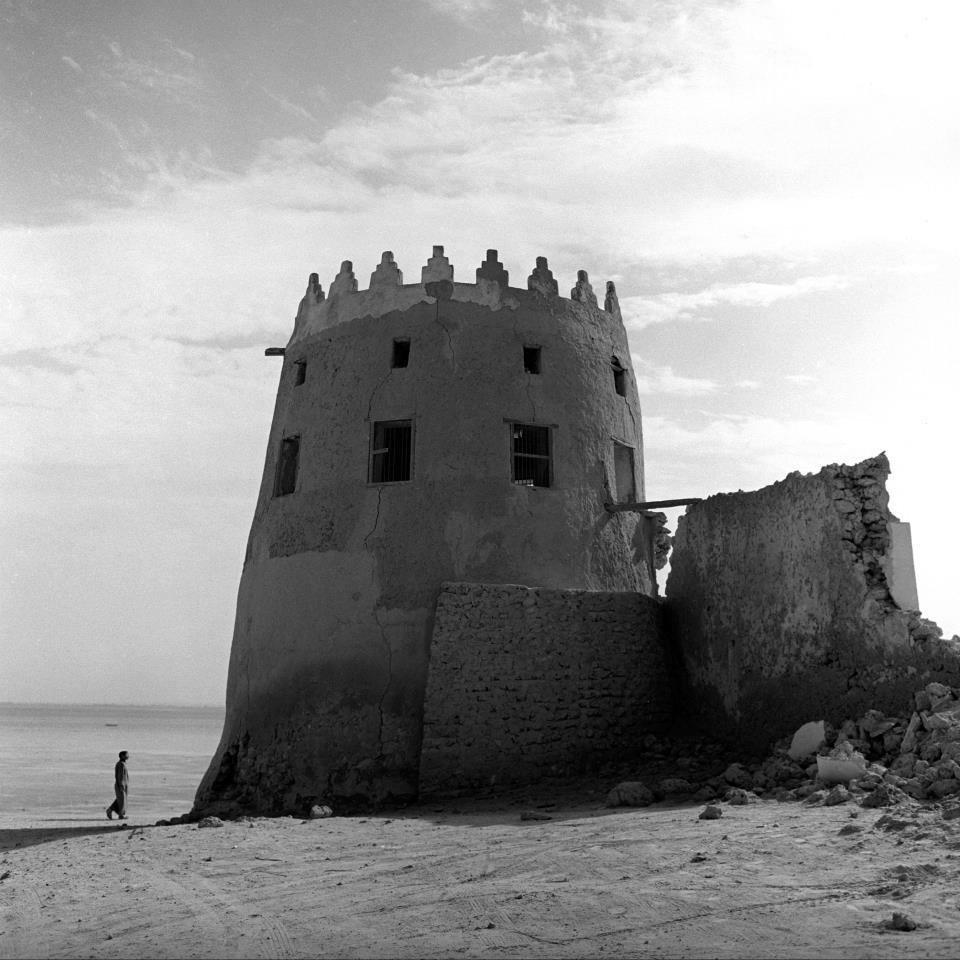
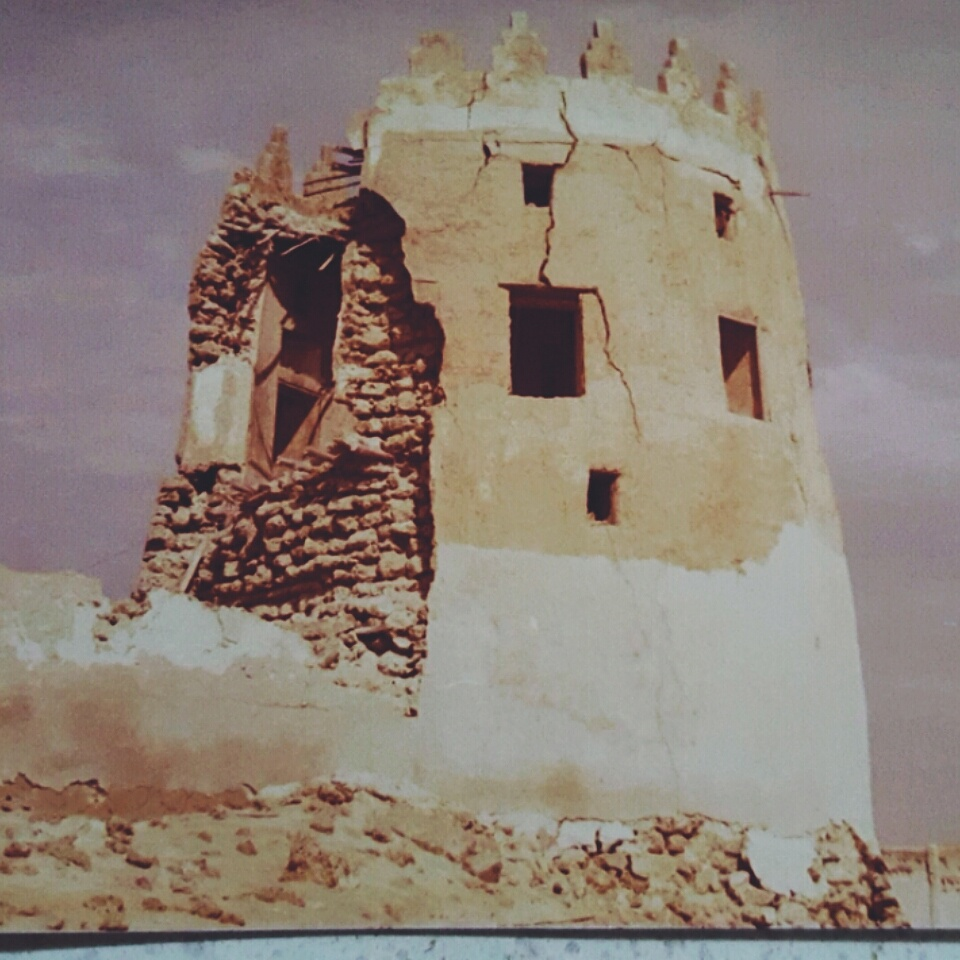
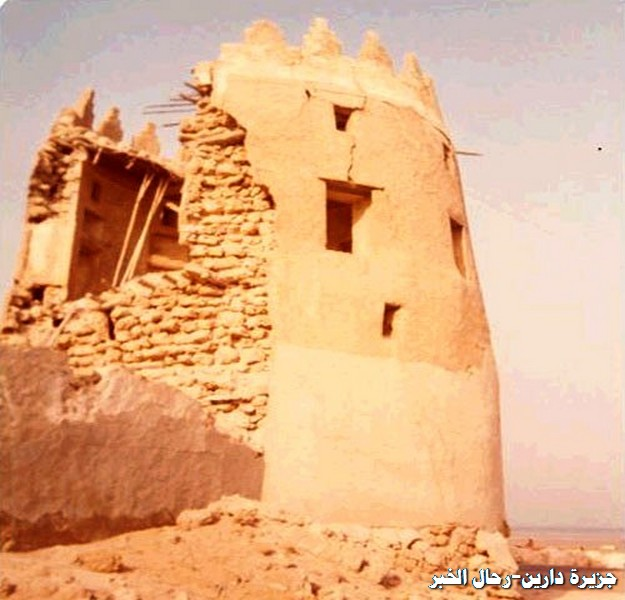
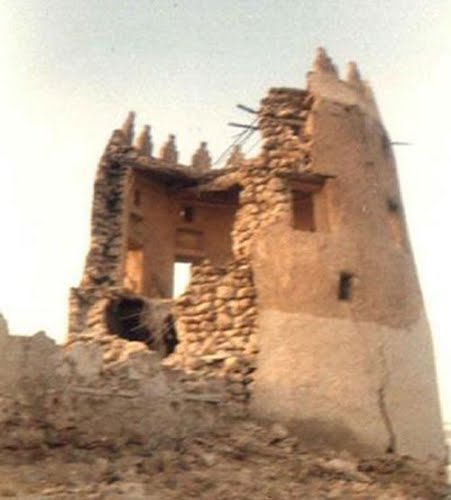
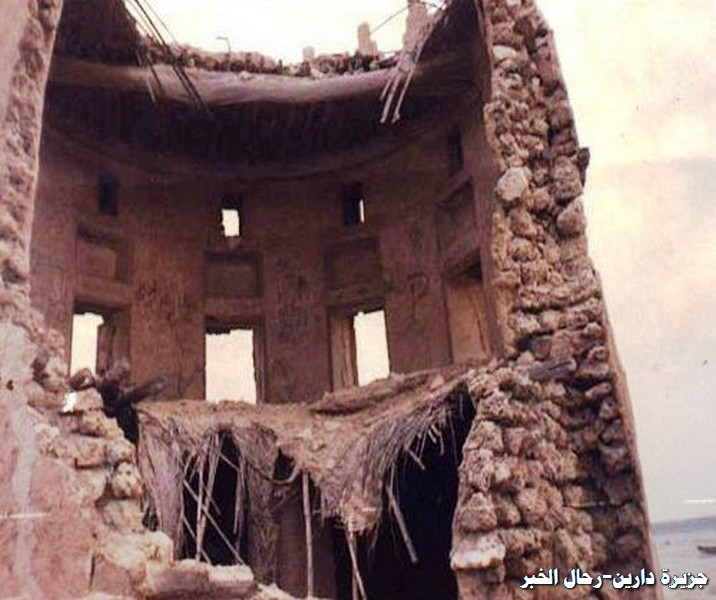
Stages of crumbling and deterioration of the remaining Darin Fortress tower over time.

Despite the historical value of the palace and its Castle, it has not previously received attention from all archaeological authorities. Most of its walls were collapsed, as well as the decorative carvings that the palace used to contain, all that remains of the castle is the tower, which has also gradually fallen into decay due to erosion and neglection. The Darin Castle archaeological site has become a dumping ground for rubble and garbage.

== Photos gallery ==
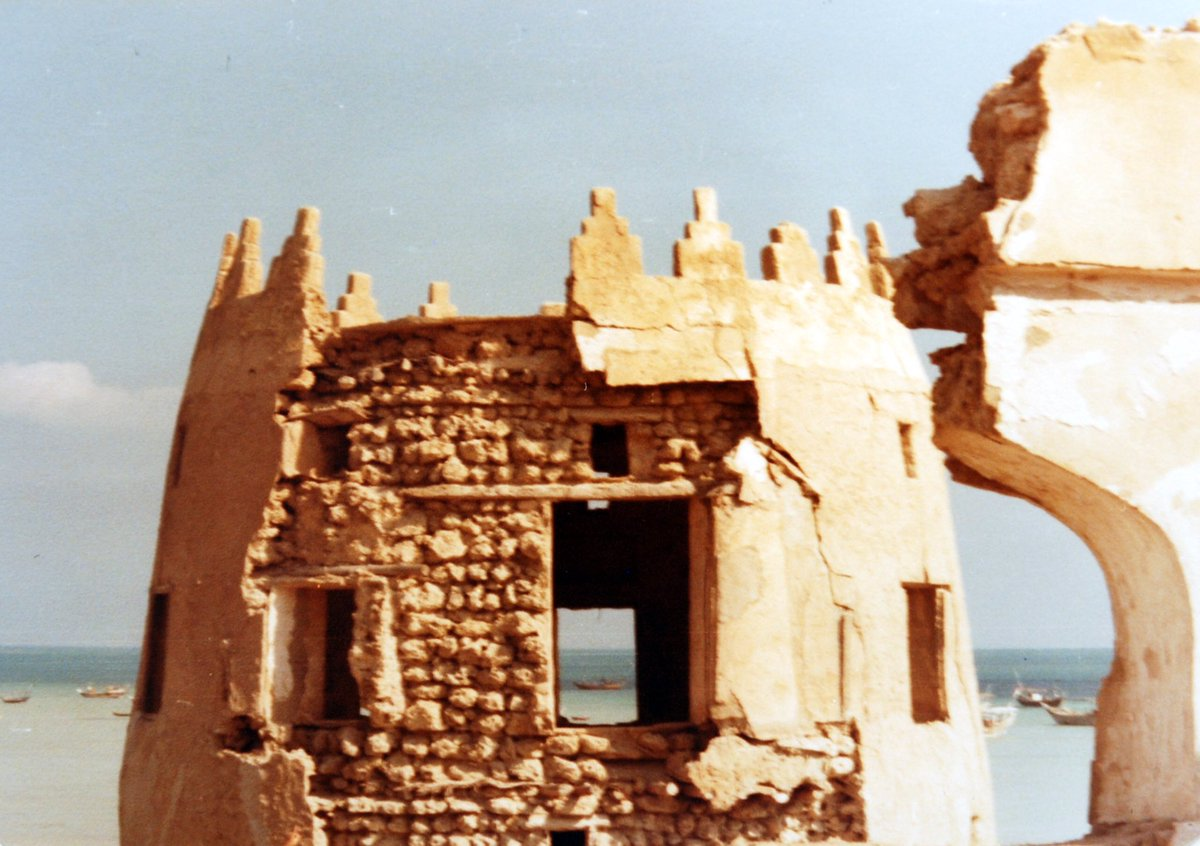
The tower of Darin Castle after the collapse of its plaster layer.

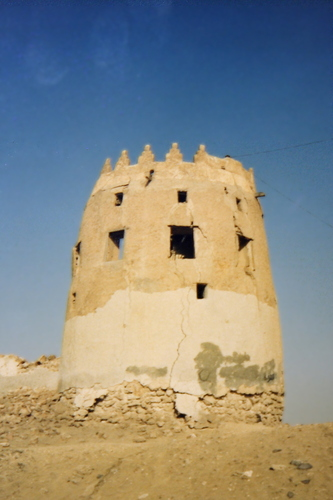
A photo of the tower of Darin Castle after cracks appeared on it.

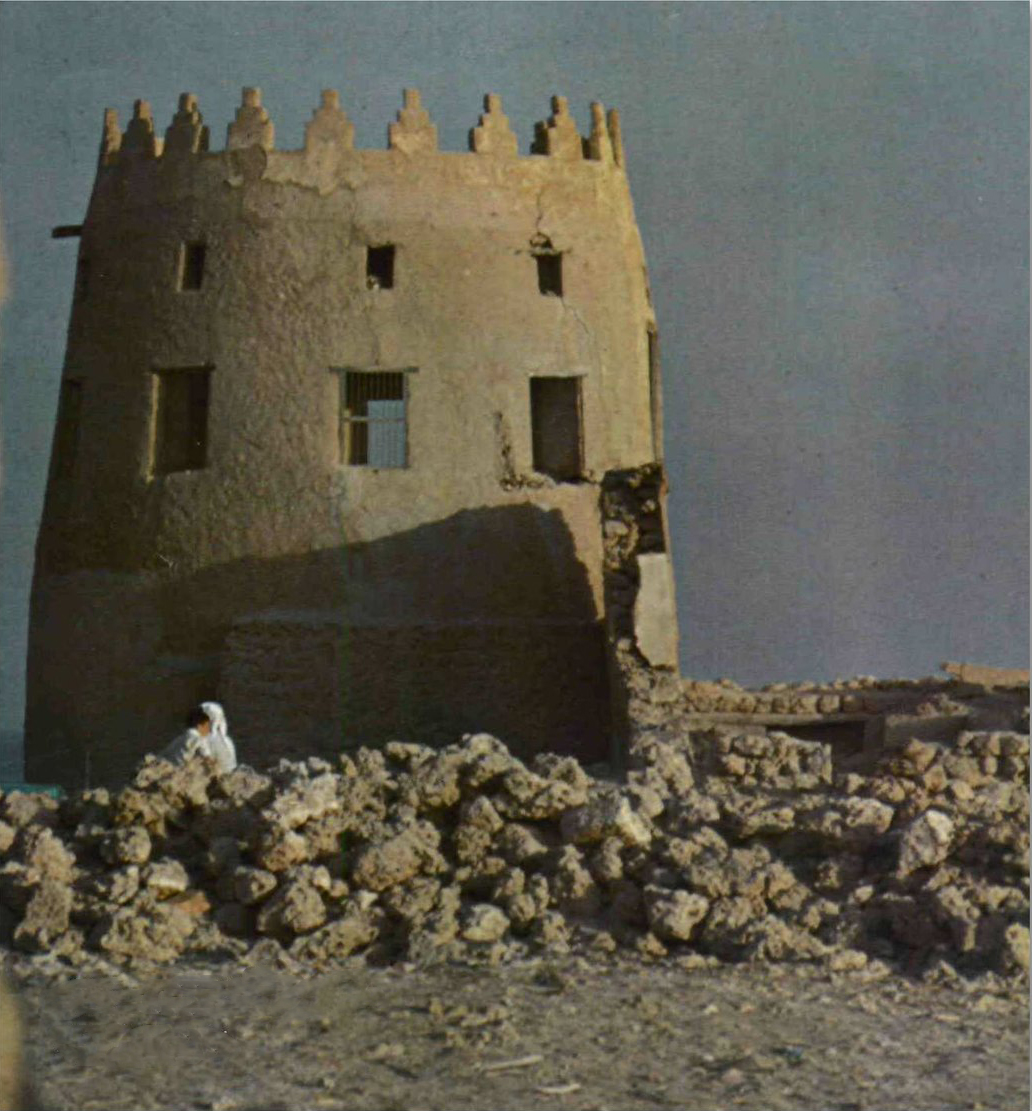
A view of the tower of Darin Castle in 1972.

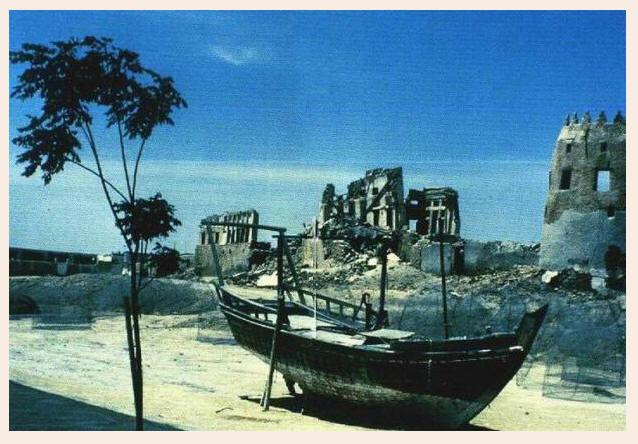
Al-Faihani Palace and Darin Castle with a boat in front of them.

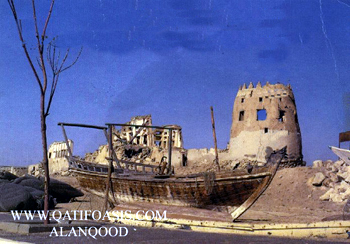
A view of Darin Castle with a fishing boat in front of it.

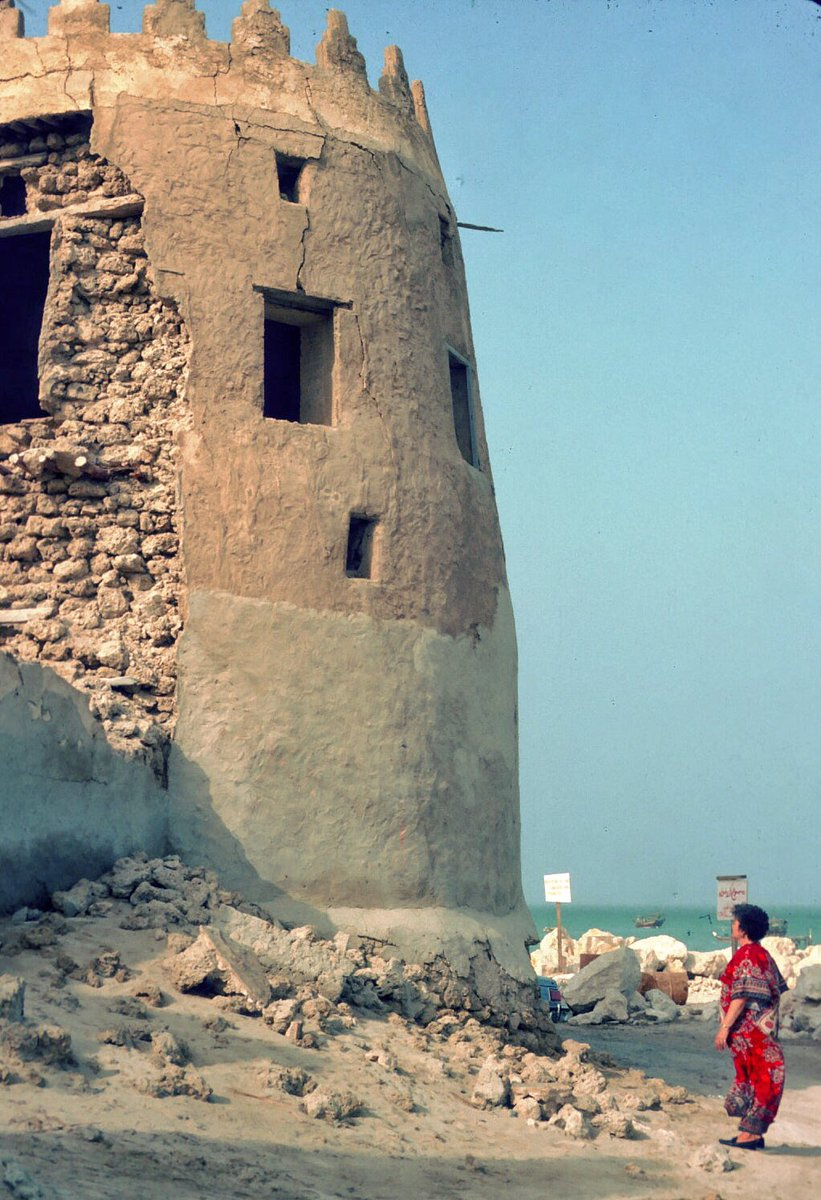
One of the towers of Darin Castle before its collapse in 1978.

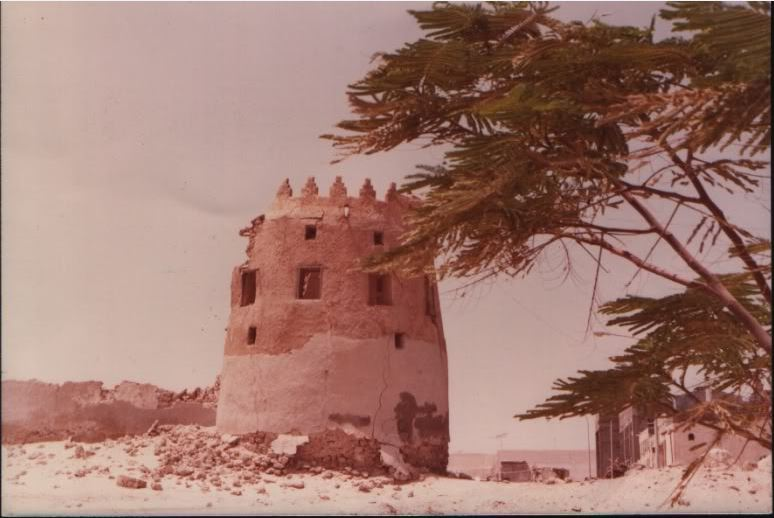
A view of the tower of Darin Castle as seen from the south.

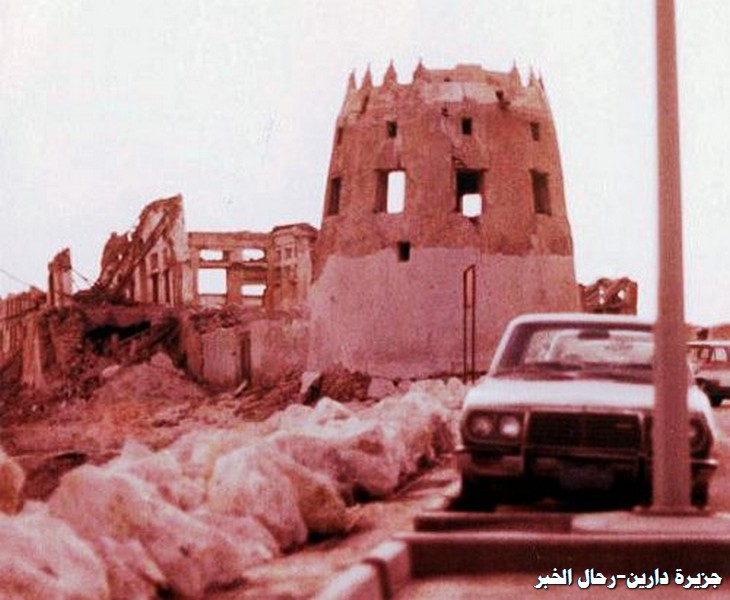
The castle tower as seen from the north side.

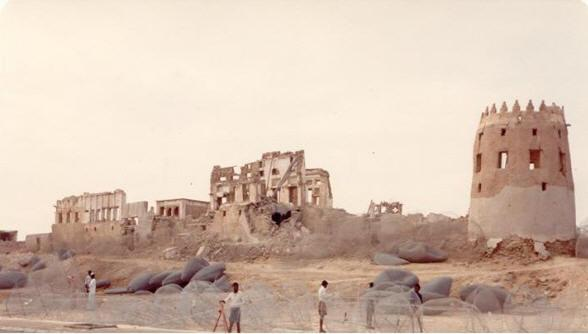
A cross-sectional view of the palace facade with one of the towers overlooking the sea, shows a set of fishing nets in front of the facade.

== See also ==
- Tarout Castle
- Qal'at al-Qatif
- Abu Loza's Bath
