= Muhammad bin Abdul Wahhab Al Faihani =

Bahraini pearl trader (1842–1906)

Pasha Muḥammad bin ʿAbdul Wahhāb Al Faiḥānī
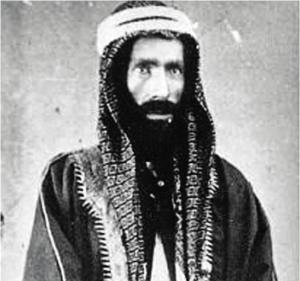
- Born: 1842; Muharraq, Bahrain
- Died: 1906 (aged 63–64); Bombay, India
- Occupations: Pearl trader, royal advisor
- Honours: The title of Pasha (Arabic: باشا, romanized: basha)

Muḥammad bin ʿAbd al-Wahhāb al-Faiḥānī (1863–1906) was a Bahraini merchant. He was a pearl trader as well as an advisor to the first ruler of the House of Thani. Formerly from Muharraq, Muhammad emigrated to the Tarout Island, where he rebuilt a 16th-century fort into a palace named after him. He died in 1906 in Bombay.

== Biography ==
=== Early life ===
Muhammad bin Abd al-Wahhab al-Faihani was born in 1842 in the city of Muharraq. He was from the Al Faihani, a noble family from east Bahrain that gained prominence amongst Qatari and Saudi Arabian circles in the late 19th to early 20th centuries. Muhammad received his education in Mecca, before returning to his homeland, where he inherited the pearl trading business from his father. Then in 1873, Muhammad became a scribe working directly under Mohammed bin Thani, the first ruler of Qatar from the House of Thani. After the death of Mohammed bin Thani in 1878, he did not have friendly relations with the succeeding ruler, Jassim bin Mohammed Al Thani, due to a heavy dispute, which ended in him and his family emigrating to the town of Darin in the southern coast of the Tarout Island.

=== Life in Darin ===
The Emirate of Nejd, which was ruling Tarout Island, gifted an old palace to be used as a place of refuge for Muhammad and his family to live in. This palace was built in the 16th century by Portuguese occupation forces. Muhammad funded an extensive renovation of the palace in 1885, moving into the palace in the same year, which led to the palace being named after him. He also entered into good relations with the Ottoman Empire, with the Ottoman administration in eastern Qatar offering him a position as governor of Zubarah in 1891 although Muhammad would turn down this request. However, he was awarded the title of Pasha and granted governship over the village he resided in, as well as the other villages around him.

=== Final years and death ===
Muhammad bin Abd al-Wahhab al-Faihani was overcome by illnesses in the early years of the 20th century and travelled to Bombay in 1906 for treatment, but died there in the same year of his arrival. After his death, the remaining members of his family emigrated to Darin in 1911.

An image of Muhammad circulated online on social media platforms in the 2010s and was falsely attributed to be the Islamic scholar and founder of Wahhabism, Ibn Abd al-Wahhab al-Najdi. The image was spread by critics of the Najdi scholar who were unaware that he had died in 1791 before the invention of the camera.

== Legacy ==
His grandson, Mohammed bin Qasim al-Faihani, was a celebrated poet and author among Qatari circles, who wrote poems that were mainly themed around romance. Al-Faihani suffered from a terminal illness in his adulthood and died at the age of thirty-three in Manama. His surviving poems have also been collected into a Diwan after being made public.

== See also ==
- Tarout Island
