= Sanabes =

Sanabes سنابس
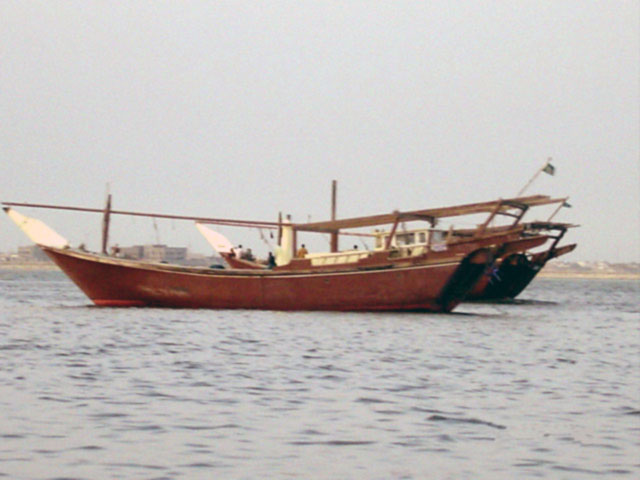
- Traditional Arabic boat commonly used for fishing.

- Location within Saudi Arabia
- Coordinates: 26°34′36″N 50°04′54″E
- Country: Saudi Arabia
- Province: Eastern Province (Ash Sharqiyah)

Population
  - Total: 7,000
- Time zone: +3 GMT

Sanabes (Arabic: سنابس) is one of the villages in Tarut Island, the second biggest island that is located on the east coast Saudi Arabia in the Persian Gulf. Sanabes extends on Tarut beach for about four kilometers which starts from what used to be called the Elementary School of Ammar ibn Yasir and now Middle school of Sanabes until Al-Saffar Farm (Arabic: عين الصفار), bounded by Al Rabai’yah southwest and by Tarut village to the west, Al-Zoor to the north and Darain to the south. The location has two advantages: The fertile soil and excellent fishing places. There is also a village called Sanabes in neighbouring Bahrain, a few miles from the capital, Manama. Like the Saudi Sanabes, the Bahraini village of Sanabes is also populated by Shi'a Muslims.

== Population ==
Population is currently estimated at 7,000. Sanabes people in the past used to work in fishing and the extraction of Pearl hunting (Diving). It was one port in the Persian Gulf region where the sailors and fishermen ships settles on its coast. The number of fishing boats was about 140 boats. As a result, Sanabes represent an important place among sailors and pearl merchants. However, Sanabes fishers now are using Zour or Dareen jetty.

== History ==
Sanabes contains many archaeological stuff from the Ottoman; old Islamic; and Portuguese Covenants; unfortunately, all of them destroyed, nothing in Sanabes - except only districts : the northern sector, and the southern district, and nearly for the four decades they expended to be dependably new ones ((City workers residential)) resulted in ((Al Saffar farm residential)) to the south of Sanabes in the eighties, in extended housing in the past few years westerly direction with the accomplishment of Al-Noor sports club center and planning the land surrounding it.

Some famous landmarks in Sanabes:

- Ayn Um Al Fursan (Water Spring): One of the well known springs in Sanabes.
- Alwazarah: Grove of the Grapevines and Palm trees, a popular place to walk and promenade.
- Sheikh Mohammed Al Mubarak Mosque: It is one of the oldest and largest mosques in Sanabes.

== Religion ==
People who live in Tarut Island and the province of Qatif, the majority of them are Muslims.

== Alnoor Club ==
Alnoor club ar:نادي النور was founded in 1961 as Sanabis's own Sports Club. The clubs hosts a variety of sports, including Soccer, Handball, Boxing, Basketball, Volleyball, Table Tennis, Fencing and athletics. Alnoor is known to have been a home for many of Saudi Arabia's most excellent athletes. The club's handball players are considered some of best in the Kingdom; having won many local and international championships in the past. Notably, The Premium Saudi Championship, Gulf Clubs Championship and the Arab Championship for Handball Clubs. Although Alnoor traditionally has given particular emphasis on Handball, it celebrated many achievements in other sports, too.

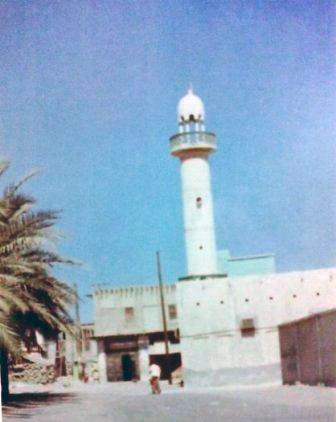
Sheikh Mohammed Al Mubarak Mosque .

== Sanabes Social Committee ==
Sanabes has a social committee which has many subcommittees. All board of directors are contributing voluntarily.

The social committee has three main goals which are commons between all Saudis Social Committees and they are as follow:

- Discover the needs of the citizens and alert them about them.
- Propose projects and programs necessary for the development of the local community and enhance the participation financially, morally and in human in the implementation, evaluation and follow-up of those projects and programs.
- Contribute to the development of human resources for the community and the discovery of social leadership and investment to achieve sustainable development.

== Dokhalah Festival ==
The Dokhalah is a pot with some seedlings planted in it (such as barley). These are handmade flowerpots made of palm tree vines which take a cylindrical shape. Children take care of these plants at the beginning of Pilgrimage Month. When Eid Al Adha day comes, children throw them toward the sea while chanting "Dokhlti Haji be..etc" it is well known in Sanabes in the eastern region of Saudi Arabia. Recently, an annual festival is held in Sanabes known as the "Dokhalah Festival" which also highlights the regional culture and heritage. The Dokhalah is known in Eastern Arabia as well.

=== Origin ===
Dokhalah is an activity originating in The Persian Gulf. It became the area's custom to perform a tradition ceremony annually during Hajj. Dokhalah ceremonies originated over 200 years ago when in each neighborhood near the coast children would gather, sing a special song, and throw the plants into the sea water.

Historically, it is said that parents had to leave their children with relatives for about 2–3 months in order to perform Hajj before the invention of faster means of transport. The Dokhalah began then as a pastime for the children in order to mitigate the impact of their parents being away for so long.

The Dokhalah ceremony is an expression about happiness of Eid Al-Adha’s advent and it is one of the most greatest holiday in Islam. Dokhalah event started during first day for Eid Al-Adha where Muslims performed their hajj at Makkah, so that, in the Dokhalah song each child solicit in.

In the Dokhalah song, children pray to Allah for the opportunity to perform the hajj when they grow older and to be reunited with their parents. The song reflects how fathers use traditional songs to teach their children about the hajj and encourage them to regard the pilgrimage as an important goal in life.

This practice was discontinued gradually due to life grown up and diminishing the down town life style. Also, the second generation has lost the interest to continue what they were gained from their old generation. In addition to that, the new generation did not attended celebration and nobody taught them about Dokhalah.

This tradition is also practiced in Kuwait and Bahrain. In Bahrain it is known as Hiyya Biyya. Research suggests that it very ancient, and may well predate the coming of Islam: see the reference by Holes below.

=== The first Dokhalah Festival ===
In 2004, very few people from the middle and old generations were interested and eager to reactivate not only Dokhalah events but other heritage in the area that related to their grandfathers’ life which includes skills, building style, and old traditional games (entertainments). They started the idea of reactivate Dokhalah ceremony and they succeeded in announcing and gathering children at the coast and done exactly what was practiced in the past. This event really ringed the bill to majority of people about Dokhalah. This start helped people to start talking to their children about Dokhalah history and the wheel started again.

In 2005, the idea was more crystallized and the event took different shape than in 2004. In 2006, it was synchronized with the establishment of Sanabes Central Social Committee which is an official committee followed to Qatif headquarters committee. All reports to Ministry of Society Affairs. Working under the Sanabes committee umbrellas gave chance to work comfortably through authorized work structure and facilitate the all license difficulties.

=== Dokhalah Festival Goals ===
The festival aimed to encourage teamwork, develop interpersonal skills, and promote participation in charitable and social activities. Another objective was to reduce road risks during the Eid holidays by providing local entertainment for families, reducing the need to travel long distances. The initiative was intended to address concerns about road accidents involving young people during the holiday period by offering a nearby alternative for family entertainment.
