= Treaty of Darin =

1915 treaty between the United Kingdom and Nejd

The Darin Pact signatories

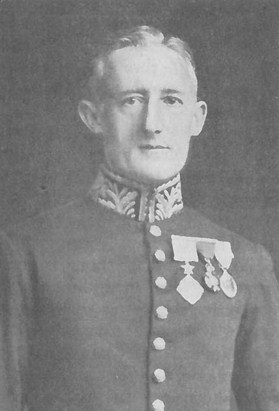
Percy Cox on behalf of the United Kingdom

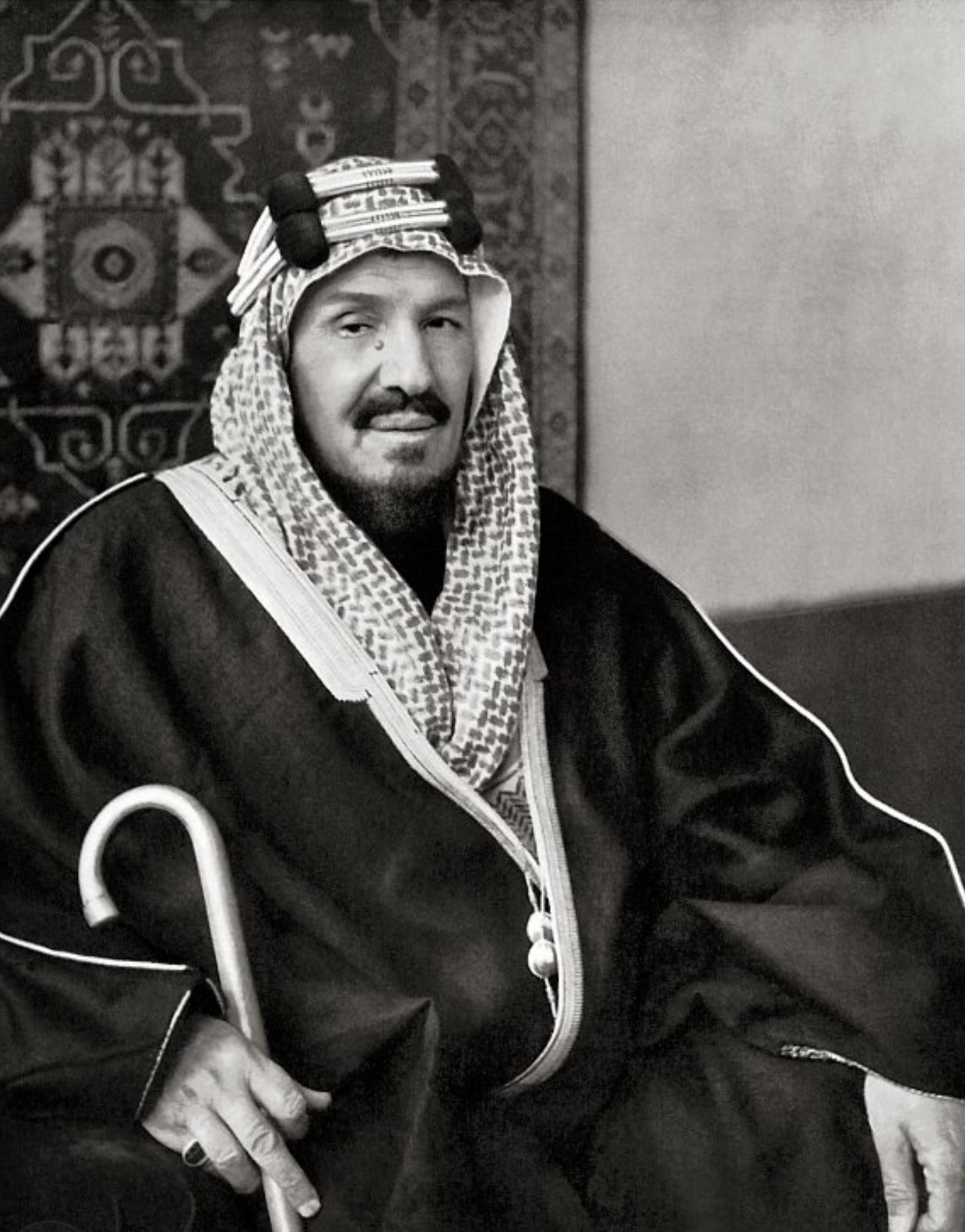
Abdulaziz Al Saud, ‘Ibn Saud’

The Treaty of Darin, or the Darin Pact, of 1915 was made between the United Kingdom and Abdulaziz Al Saud (sometimes called Ibn Saud), ruler of the Emirate of Nejd and Hasa, who founded the Kingdom of Saudi Arabia in 1932.

== Signing ==
The treaty was signed at Darin, on the island of Tarut on 26 December 1915 by Abdulaziz and Sir Percy Cox on behalf of the British Government.

== Terms ==
The treaty made the lands of the House of Saud a British protectorate and attempted to define its boundaries. The British aim was to guarantee the sovereignty of Kuwait, Qatar and the Trucial States.

Following the treaty, Abdulaziz obtained the following from the British: recognition as the ruler of Najd and its dependencies under British protection; a loan of £20,000 and a shipment of arms in June 1916; a monthly stipend of £5,000 and from the end of World War I to March 1924 an annual stipend of £60,000 in January 1917. The first article of the treaty also acknowledged the rights of Abdulaziz's sons to rule.

== Significance ==
The treaty was the first to give international recognition to the fledgling Saudi state. For the first time in Nejdi history, the concept of negotiated borders had been introduced. Additionally, the British aim was to secure its Persian Gulf protectorates, but the treaty had the unintended consequence of legitimising Saudi control in the adjacent areas. The Treaty was superseded in 1927 by the Treaty of Jeddah.
