= Tarout Island =

Island in Saudi Arabia

Native name: جزيرة تاروت
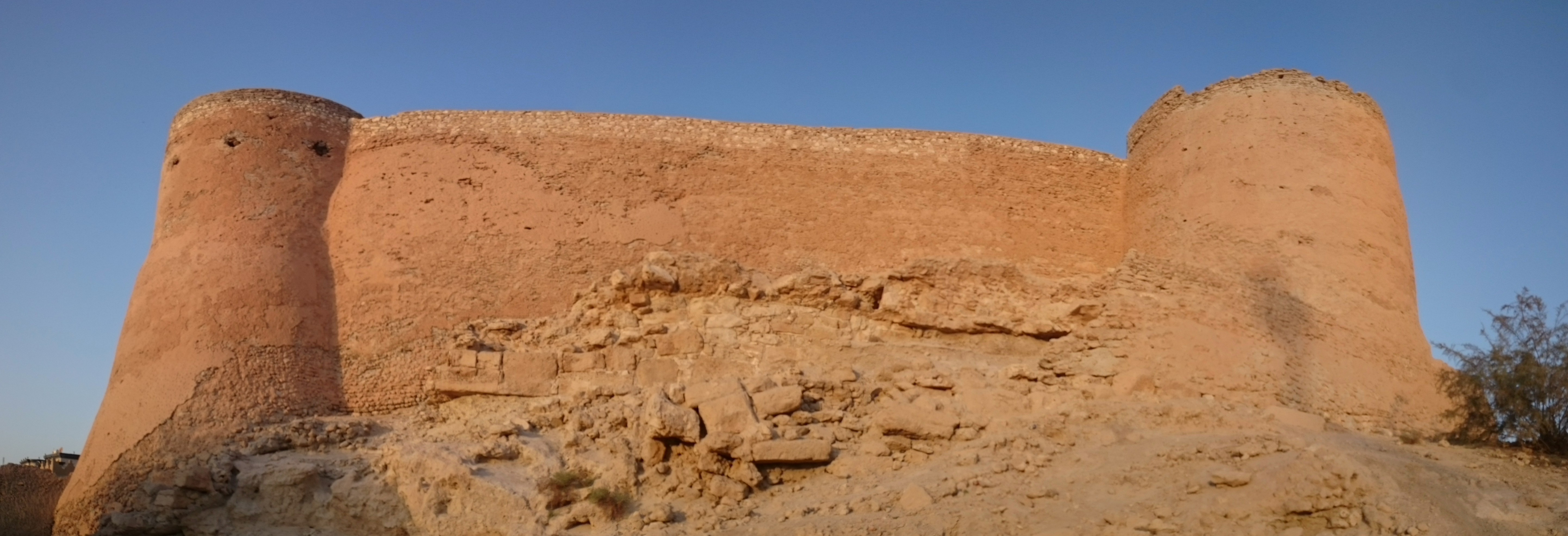
- Tarout Castle
- Interactive map of Tarout Island (click to zoom or switch to satellite view)

Geography
- Location: Persian Gulf (6 km (3.7 mi) off the coast)
- Coordinates: 26.571°N 50.056°E
- Area: 20.3 km^{2} (7.8 sq mi)
- Length: 6 km (3.7 mi)

Administration
- Saudi Arabia
- Province: Eastern Province
- Governorate: Qatif Governorate

Demographics
- Population: 117,646 (2022)

Tarout Island (Arabic: جزيرة تاروت) is an island in Saudi Arabia, located in the Persian Gulf as part of Qatif Governorate in the Eastern Province. It has an area of 20.3 km^{2} (7.8 sq mi) and lies 6 km (3.7 mi) off the coast, connected to the Mainland by three causeways.

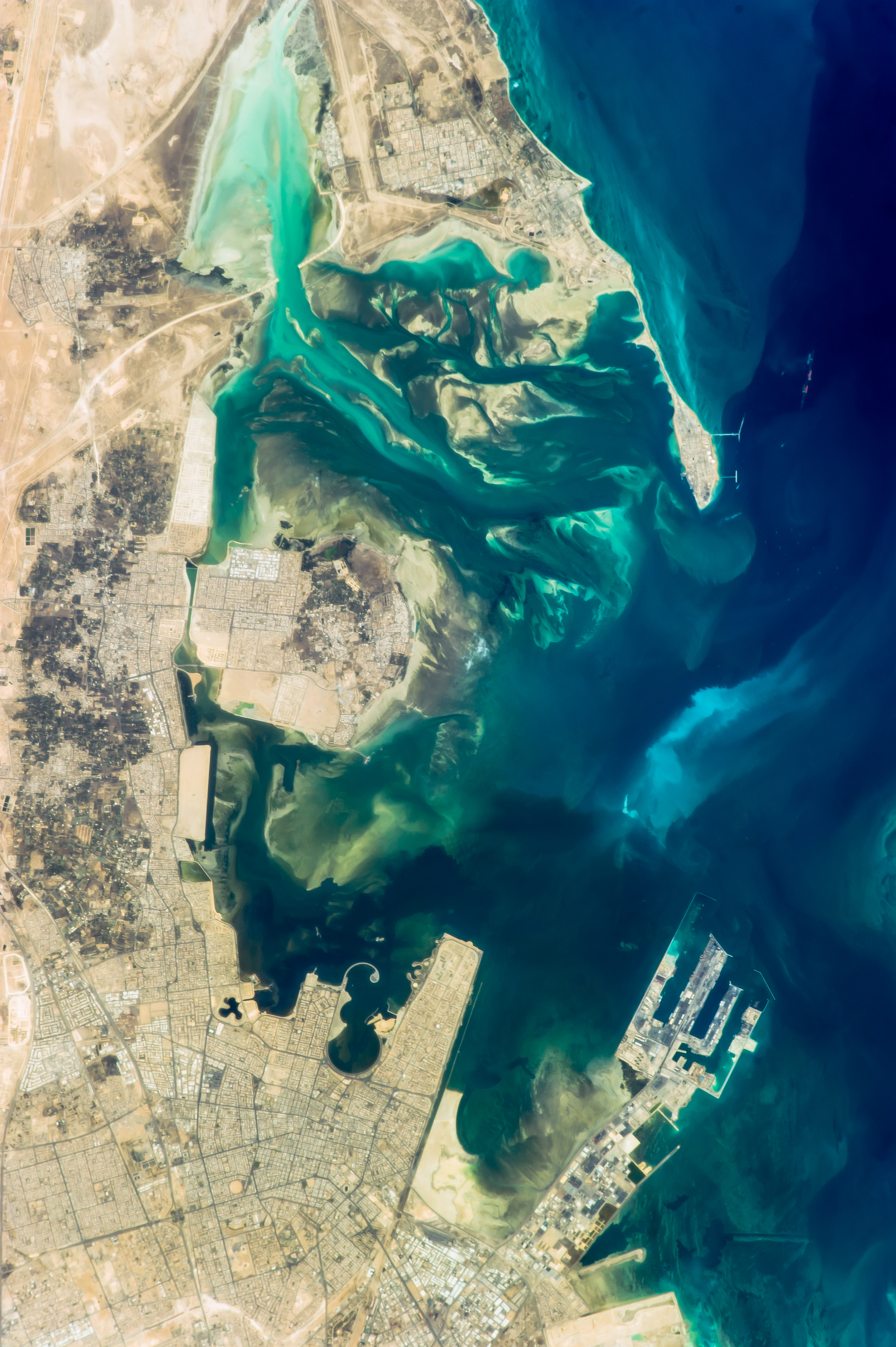
Northeast Dammam, Saihat, Qatif, Tarout Island, and Ras Tanura, taken from the International Space Station.

== History ==
Tarout Island is as one of the oldest continuously inhabited places in the Persian Gulf. Archaeological finds provide evidence that human settlement on the island dates back more than 5,000 years. The island was an essential link between Mesopotamia, the Indus Valley Civilisation, and the Arabian Peninsula. Dilmun civilization)

The Island had a significant role in trade activity in the entire Persian Gulf region. It was a central point for trade between Mesopotamia and along the coastal areas in the east of the Arabian Peninsula. Its strong relationships with many of the urbanized areas along the region were well known.

Tarout was the heart of the Dilmun Kingdom and had a major role in the history of the region since 3000 BC. Human habitation in this area over the centuries was very large and archaeological discoveries were found until recently, which is rare in most parts of the world's archaeological sites.

The Christian practice that a marriage was only valid if blessed by a priest was first mandated by a synod of Christians living in the region held in Darin in 676 CE by Patriarch George I—chief bishop of the Church of the East, one of the two main churches of the Syriac Christian tradition.

=== History of the name ===
The ancient Arabic name for the place was apparently 'Ishtarut (عشتروت); in the Greek Geographia of Ptolemy it is called Tharrō (θαρρώ); on a map Ptolemy’s Geographia published in Latin in 1578 it appears as Tharro.

In the Middle Ages the island was often called Dairin or Daryn, for one of its cities.; Darīn is actually the name of its main harbor, and there have also been more modern attempts to rename it Darīn. The Treaty of Darin was signed on the island in 1915 between Ibn Saud and the United Kingdom.

== Archaeology ==
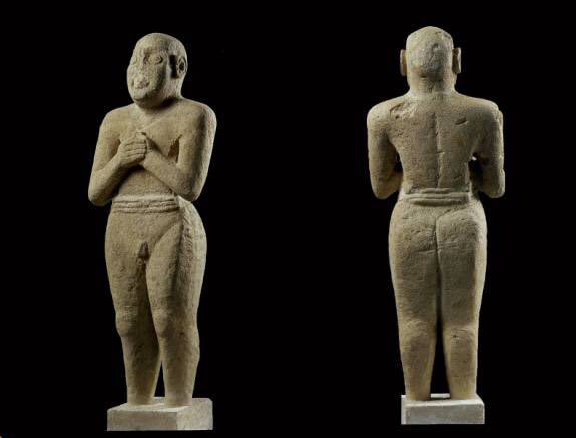
The Worshiping Servant statue (2500 BC)

Archaeological finds indicate that the island has been inhabited since 5000 BC; and it was later home to people from the civilization of Dilmun, Akkadians, Assyrians and Persians. Later it was occupied by the Persian Empire, the Islamic Empire; it was colonized by the Portuguese and later made part of the Ottoman Empire.

The most important collections found in the Tarout was pure golden statue representing Ashtaroot goddess. The statue was found placed on the ground in one of the palm groves in the Tarout.

There are many other statues, copper and pottery vessels and traditional weapons found in the Tarout that are displayed in the Riyadh Museum. It also contains a Portuguese fort which is located in Al Deyrah. The Portuguese castle was repaired in the 951H, which had been built on the ruins of former settlements and one of the oldest ones, dating back to over 5,000 years ago.

The site consists of the Fortress of Al-Sheikh Muhammad bin Abdul Wahhab Al Fehani, which was built in 1303H as well as the Fortress of Abu Al-leaf, which is located between the Tarout and Al Qatif, in addition to the three mosques on the old road from Al Qatif.

In 1959 a man cleaning a street discovered rocks with Sabaean inscriptions on them. The most famous artefacts found on Tārūt were unearthed by Danish archaeologists in 1968; they excavated shards of pottery dating back to 4,500 BC, and others from 3000 BC. When the municipality of Qatīf wanted to build a causeway to Tārūt in 1962 they took sand from the hill known as Tell Rafī’ah, and found Stone Age artifacts, including pottery, and a statue. The last discovery was in 1993 on Tell Rafī’ah. Sometimes archaeological ruins are discovered by accident; something that occurred when a car repair workshop was being renovated and tombs dating back to 2000 BC were found.

Many vessels have been found on Tārūt carved from steatite, particularly from Tell Rafī'ah; the designs are very artistic and include representations of cats, nude men, and motifs connected with the sea and fishing. The source of the steatite was actually in South Western Persia, but the carving industry seems to have been a local one.

Among the ancient statues discovered in Tārūt is one of a naked man made out of dark grey stone. It was found in the 1950s by a man ploughing his field. It is 94 cm high, and the man is standing in a reverential posture, with wide eyes. It is almost certainly Sumerian in origin, though it was found about 1000 kilometers from the nearest city of Sumer. It is a very high quality object, but was almost destroyed by the superstitious villagers, who thought it had something to do with spirits (jinn), and so cut it in half and beheaded it. It has been restored and now stands the National Museum of Riyadh.

In 1962 when some of the inhabitants of the village of Rabī'iyah were replacing their former thatched houses with buildings of stone and plaster, a man climbing some of the hills looking for stones, they chanced upon a jar, and then discovered a number of graves, which experts later suggested were likely to be Jewish in origin. They also found many earthenware vessels at the same site. At Khārijīyah in the north of Tārūt many clay figurines have also been found.

=== Sea port ===
Tarout Island represents one of the most important sea ports in all parts of Saudi Arabia.

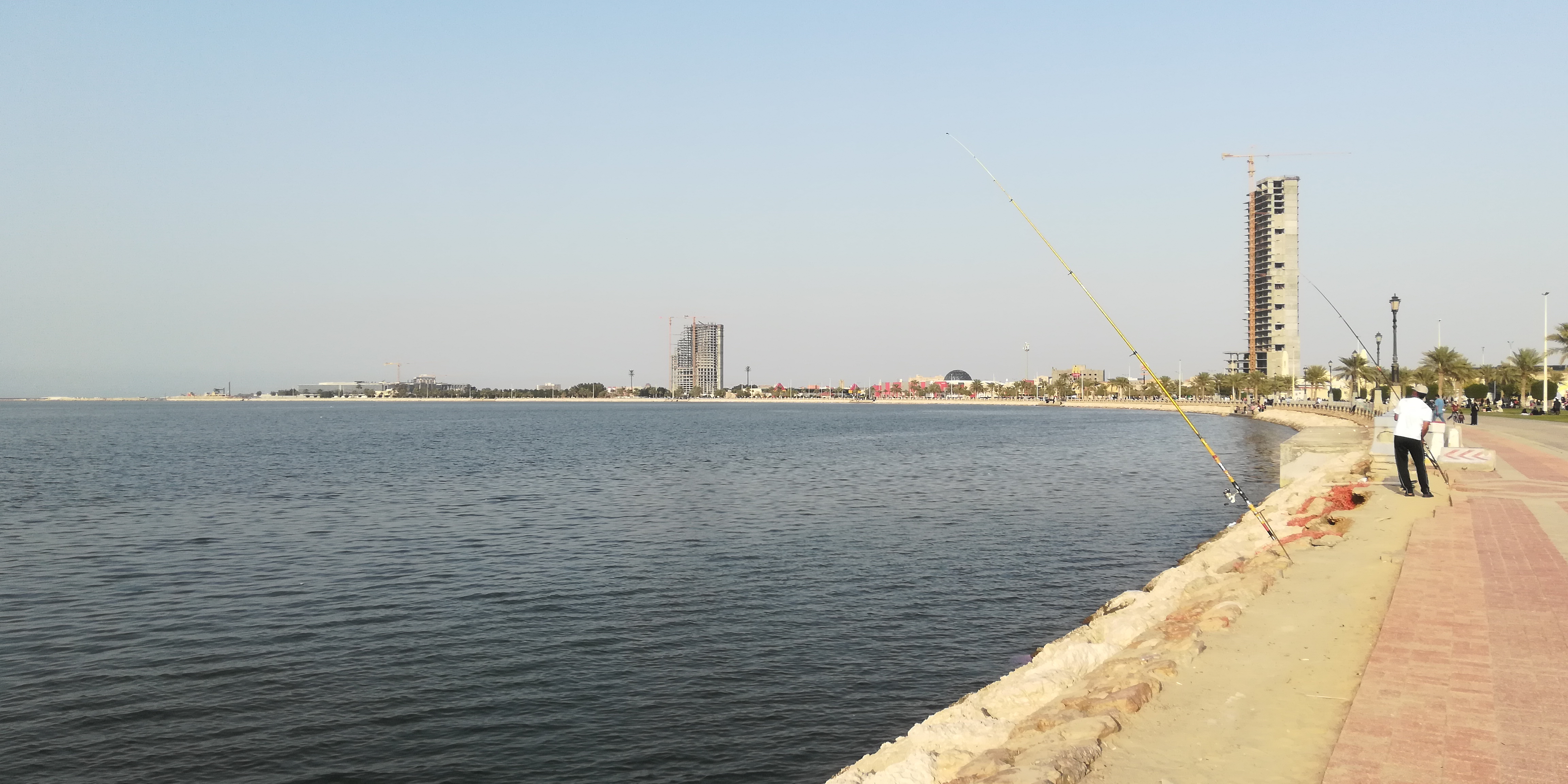
Coast of Tarout bay

In ancient times, the island was a vital seaport to receive boats from the Persian Gulf and Indian Ocean. Tarout was a metropolis on the island, which took its name from its castle located in the heart of the island, surrounded by small villages.

Traces of ancient settlements can be found at the two traditional harbors of Tarout — Sanabes in the northeast and Darin in the south.

== Tarout Castle ==
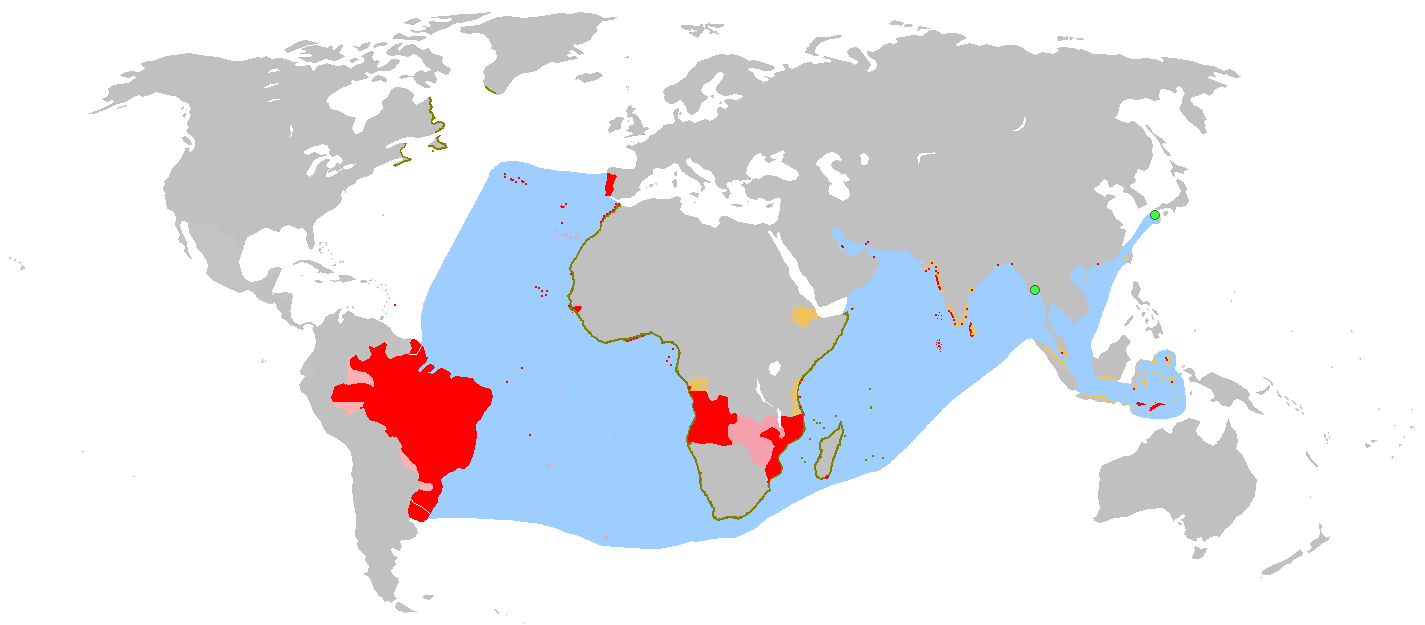
Portuguese Empire

Tarout Castle is located in the center of Tarout Island atop a small hill, known as Tall Tawt, overlooking the historical neighborhood of Al Deyrah. The foundational structure of the current castle was built during the rule of the Uyunid dynasty (Uyunid Emirate), the Arab Muslim dynasty that controlled Eastern Arabia. It was built over ancient ruins (Tell (archaeology)) dating as far back as 5000 BC.

The military fort, built between 1515 and 1521, is a testament to the nearly 150 years period of control by the Portuguese Empire in the Persian Gulf. After the Portuguese conquest of Hormuz in 1507 by Afonso de Albuquerque and conquest of Bahrain by António Correia Baharem that gave the Portuguese full control of the trade between India and Europe passing through the Persian Gulf, they would fortify their trading outposts with defensive forts, such as this one and the Qal'at al-Bahrain. King Muqrin's rule was the last time that “Bahrain” would refer to the historic region of Bahrain rather than to the archipelago of islands that constitutes the present state.

This Portuguese expansion culminated in a large naval war with the Ottoman Empire over control of the Persian Gulf (Portuguese–Safavid relations). The Portuguese lost control of historic region of Bahrain starting 300 years of Ottoman rule.

The Portuguese, were forced to hand the fort over in 1559 and withdrew from the Tarout island to Awal Island, (now Bahrain).

King Abdulaziz Foundation for Research and Archives in Riyadh is enjoying a lot of archaeological material of historical significance, which was discovered at the Tarout Heritage Palace. The later found material is an ancient army cannon going dating back to the same time, which is currently being shown in the Dammam Regional Museum.

== Attractions ==
- Tarout historical fort
- Al Rafiea airport (1911-1932); built in 1911 during World War I by the British Empire
- Fortress of Abu Al-leaf built in the 16th century by the Portuguese; destroyed by the British Empire in 1866
- Darin seaport
- Darin historical fort
- Traditional Houses
- Al Khudar mosque
- Darin cornice
- Sanabis cornice
- Al Zoor cornice
- Visitor's center on front of Darin seaport and on the left side of ruins of the palace. (Must see place). It's museum in the traditional house (200y.o.).

== Main villages ==
villages
Dareen
Al-Rabieia
Sanabes
Al-Zoor
Fariq Al-Atrish
Al-Deyrah

- Al-Deyrah: Tarout Center at the present time is known as Al Deyrah, which represents a major administrative center of the villages during different periods. Al Dira County Quarter is the oldest Quarter on the island dating back to Phoenician times, where you can see the adjacent stone and mud buildings crisscrossed by narrow streets and corridors. Wandering through the streets will remind you of the fragrance of historical periods of the ancient place. Al Deyrah was surrounded by a fence for the purpose of protection from attacks by invaders. To its east side it is adjoined by the Tarout castle, which is considered a well-fortified castle on the island. The castle is located on a tall hill, which is the highest place on the island. The island consists of Ain Tarut. In the early times, that was the only source of water on the island, and it is known as "Hamam Tarout ”, the Tarout Bath.

== See also ==
- The Red Sea Destination
- Provinces of Saudi Arabia
- List of islands in the Red Sea
- List of islands of Saudi Arabia
- List of islands in the Persian Gulf
- List of governorates of Saudi Arabia
- List of cities and towns in Saudi Arabia
